= St Mary's Pro-Cathedral, Christchurch =

Coordinates: 43.5231°S 172.6393°E

St Mary's Pro-Cathedral
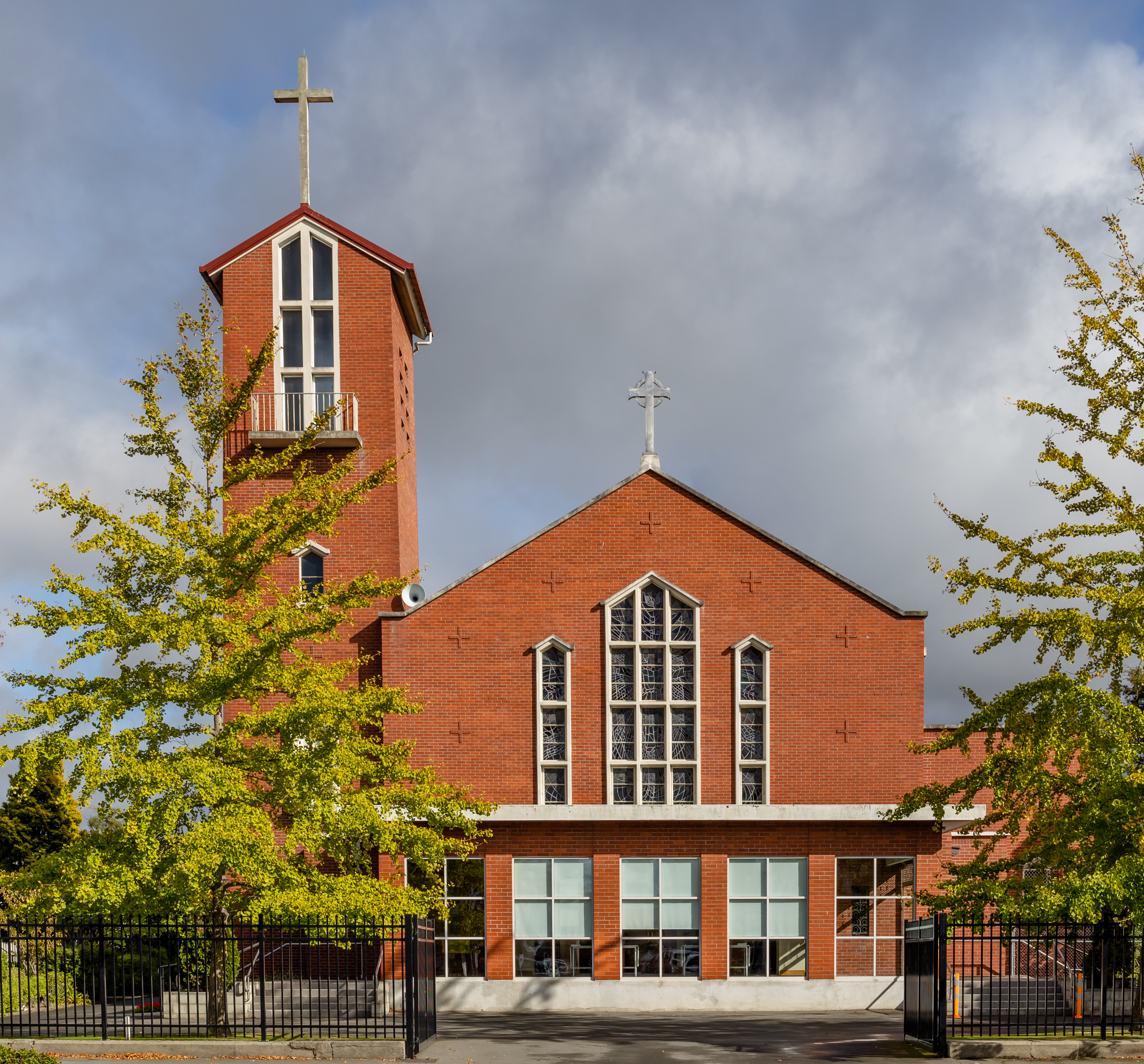
- St Mary's Pro-Cathedral
- Location: Christchurch
- Country: New Zealand
- Denomination: Roman Catholic
- Website: Official website

Administration
- Diocese: Roman Catholic Diocese of Christchurch
- Parish: Cathedral Parish

Clergy
- Bishop: Michael Gielen, 11th Bishop of Christchurch (2022–present)
- Priest: Fr Simon Eccleton

The St Mary's Pro-Cathedral, or St Mary's Church, is a Catholic church located on Manchester Street in Christchurch, in the South Island of New Zealand.

It serves as the seat of the bishop of the Latin Catholic Diocese of Christchurch (Dioecesis Christopolitana), which was erected in 1887.

The parish was established in 1889, and the building served as a parish church from its construction until it obtained the temporary status of pro-cathedral, as a result of the earthquakes of 2010 and 2011, in which the Cathedral of the Blessed Sacrament was seriously damaged and later demolished.

== Choir and orchestra ==
Cathedral of the Blessed Sacrament Music
- Choir and Orchestra
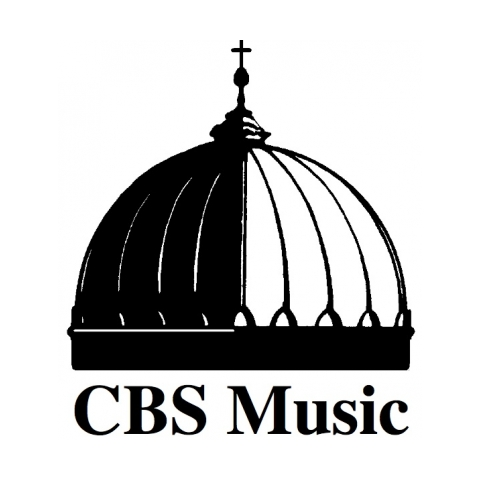
- Short name: CBS Music
- Founded: 1969
- Location: Christchurch, New Zealand
- Concert hall: Cathedral of the Blessed Sacrament (1969–2010), St Mary's Pro-Cathedral (2010–)
- Principal conductor: Don Whelan
- Website: www.cathedral.org.nz

The Cathedral of the Blessed Sacrament Music (CBS Music) are the primary music providers for Masses at St Mary's Pro-Cathedral. Before the Canterbury earthquakes, they were based at the Cathedral of the Blessed Sacrament. The CBS is an affiliate of the RSCM New Zealand Canterbury Branch.

The first formation of a choir, under the leadership of Don Whelan, was at Christ The King, Burnside. Whelan started working with Dutch immigrants, who come from a choral culture, understood the art of singing in parts well. Whelan soon became a well-trained organist, organising cantors and the choir. Before Easter 1969, an organist was needed for the services at the Cathedral of the Blessed Sacrament. Whelan took this opportunity and the CBS Choir was formed.

During their first international tour to Europe in 1990–1991, the CBS was given status as cultural ambassadors by the New Zealand Government. During their third European tour, the choir were invited to lead the singing during the Papal Midnight Mass in celebration of the inauguration the Holy Year of Jubilee Due to the 2010 Canterbury Earthquake, the Cathedral of the Blessed Sacrament was badly damaged, leading it to be closed for the foreseeable future. Masses moved next door to the chapel. During the 2011 Christchurch Earthquake, the cathedral partially collapsed, as well as the chapel and music center being badly damaged and demolished afterwards. The CBS built a new state of the art facility at St Mary's Pro-Cathedral in which to house their music library, offices and a practice hall.

Despite the Canterbury Earthquakes, the choir and orchestra were still able to go ahead with their annual New Zealand tours, as well as going on their first Asian tour in 2012 and their fifth Australian and European tours in 2013 and 2015, respectively. In October 2019, members and associates of the CBS celebrated 50 years under the leadership of Don Whelan, with a luncheon at the Rydges Hotel in Central Christchurch.

In March 2020, the Catholic bishops of New Zealand ordered the temporary suspension of Masses and churches to be temporarily closed due to the COVID-19 pandemic in NZ. Shortly afterwards, the rest of the CBS program was halted due to the national lockdown. The Wednesdays at One music programme, concerts, annual music events, and the appearances at Masses were suspended for the first time in its history. On 14 June, the CBS was able to begin their program, celebrating the Cathedral's feast of Corpus Christi. The Wednesdays at One music programme resumed in July 2020.

=== Concert program ===
Wednesdays at One is a weekly concert series hosted by the CBS. This entails local and national musicians of all ages to perform the works of many composers on many different instruments. Annual concerts of Bach's St John Passion and Handel's Messiah are performed on Good Friday and in mid-December, respectively. In June, during the Diocese's Feast Day (Cathedral Feast of Corpus Christi) celebrations, a concert is given, where usually a Mass is performed. In 2019, John Ritchie's Missa Corpus Christi was performed, as well as MacMillan's Hymn to the Blessed Sacrament and Mendelssohn's Verleih uns Frieden.

On the first Sunday of each month (excluding January), orchestral Masses are performed with the choir. Every other Sunday, the choir sings contemporary, polyphonic, and Gregorian chant compositions. Orchestral Masses with the choir are also performed at the Christmas Vigil and Midnight Mass.

=== Personnel ===
Below is a list of key personnel.

Cathedral Music Director:

- Don Whelan (1969–2021)
- Michael Collins (2021–present)

CBS Music Director:

- Don Whelan (1969–present)

Assistant CBS Music Director:

- Simon Mace (2018–2019)
- Nicholas Sutcliffe (2019–present)

Cantor:

- Wally Enright

Concertmaster:

- Natalia M. Lomeiko

== See also ==
- Christchurch Catholic Cathedral, the proposed replacement of the Cathedral of the Blessed Sacrament
- Roman Catholicism in New Zealand
- St Mary's Cathedral, Dublin, Ireland
