= Cathedral of the Blessed Sacrament =

Cathedral of the Blessed Sacrament may refer to:

- Cathedral of the Blessed Sacrament, Christchurch, New Zealand
  - The new replacement, also called: Cathedral of the Blessed Sacrament, Christchurch, New Zealand
- Cathedral of the Blessed Sacrament (Sacramento, California)
- Cathedral of the Most Blessed Sacrament in Detroit, Michigan
- Cathedral of the Blessed Sacrament (Altoona, Pennsylvania)
- Cathedral of the Blessed Sacrament (Greensburg, Pennsylvania)

== See also ==
- Blessed Sacrament Church (disambiguation)
