= Denis Hanrahan =

6th Roman Catholic Bishop of Christchurch, New Zealand

- 6th Bishop of Christchurch

Personal details
- Born: 1 November 1933 Greymouth, New Zealand
- Died: 1 February 1987 (aged 53) Christchurch, New Zealand

Denis William Hanrahan (1 November 1933 – 1 February 1987) was the sixth Roman Catholic Bishop of Christchurch, New Zealand. He was appointed Coadjutor Bishop of Christchurch on 25 March 1984 by Pope John Paul II, succeeded to the see of Christchurch on 4 July 1985 on the retirement of his predecessor Bishop Ashby and died in office on 1 February 1987.

== Early life ==
Hanrahan was born in Greymouth, New Zealand, and was educated there by the Sisters of Mercy and the Marist Brothers. He trained for the priesthood at Holy Cross College, Mosgiel.

== Priesthood ==
Hanrahan was ordained a priest by Bishop Joyce on 21 July 1957 in Greymouth. In 1970 he went to Manila to study for a year at the East Asian Pastoral Institute. On returning to Christchurch in 1971, he lived with the Brothers of St John of God, at what was then Marylands, at Halswell. Hanrahan was appointed Diocesan Director for Religious Education in 1971. He remained in this position until becoming Parish Priest at Bishopdale in 1979. He was also chairman of the Christchurch Priests' Senate from 1979 until 1983.

== Episcopacy ==
Hanrahan was appointed Coadjutor Bishop of Christchurch 25 March 1984 and was consecrated on 6 June 1984 by Bishop Ashby, Archbishop Magnoni (the Pro-Nuncio) and Cardinal Williams. When Bishop Ashby retired on 4 July 1985, Hanrahan succeeded him as Bishop of Christchurch and he was formally enthroned in the Cathedral of the Blessed Sacrament on 5 August 1985. On 24 November 1986, he hosted Pope John Paul II at his Cathedral during the Papal visit to New Zealand at an ecumenical service during which the Pope dedicated a chapel for Christian Unity. In 1987 Hanrahan took over the role of Episcopal Vicar for New Zealand Catholic Education, a role previously held by Bishop Kavanagh who had died in 1985.

== Death ==
Hanrahan died completely unexpectedly after a game of tennis at the age of 53 in the evening of Sunday, 1 February 1987. The chief celebrant of his concelebrated Requiem Mass was Cardinal Williams. Hanrahans predecessor as Bishop of Christchurch, Bishop Ashby, was also one of the celebrants. Bishop Hanrahan is buried at Bromley Cemetery.

== Notes ==
Catholic Church titles
Preceded by none	Coadjutor Bishop of Christchurch; 1984–1985	Succeeded by Barry Jones
Preceded by Brian Ashby	Bishop of Christchurch; 1985–1987	Succeeded by Basil Meeking
