= Basil Meeking =

New Zealand bishop (1929–2020)

The Most Reverend Basil Meeking
- 7th Bishop of Christchurch
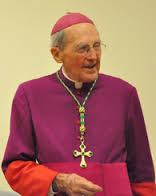
- Appointed: 30 March 1987
- Installed: 3 June 1987
- Term ended: 15 December 1995
- Predecessor: Denis Hanrahan
- Successor: John Cunneen

Orders
- Ordination: 19 July 1953 by Edward Joyce
- Consecration: 3 June 1987 by Thomas Williams

Personal details
- Born: 19 November 1929 Ashburton, New Zealand
- Died: 11 June 2020 (aged 90) Christchurch, New Zealand

John Basil Meeking (19 November 1929 – 11 June 2020) was the seventh bishop of Christchurch, New Zealand from 1987 to 1995.

== Career ==
Having been ordained as a priest in 1953, he was appointed as Bishop of Christchurch by Pope John Paul II on 30 March 1987 and resigned the see on 15 December 1995. During this time, among other apostolic works, he served as the chaplain to Christchurch Hospital and represented the Catholic Church at the National Council of Churches.

From 1963 to 1966, he studied at the Pontifical University of Saint Thomas Aquinas in Rome, following which he was appointed to the Pontifical Council for Promoting Christian Unity in Rome, where he served for eighteen years.

Bishop Meeking died in Christchurch on 11 June 2020, aged 90, after what was reported as a "recent period of ill-health".

== Notes ==
Catholic Church titles
Preceded by Denis Hanrahan	Bishop of Christchurch; 1987–1995	Succeeded by John Cunneen
