= St Mary's Pro-Cathedral =

St Mary's Pro-Cathedral may refer to:

- St Mary's Cathedral, Dublin, Ireland, formerly St Mary's Pro-Cathedral
- St Mary's Pro-Cathedral, Christchurch, New Zealand
- Holy Name of Mary Pro-Cathedral (Sault Ste. Marie, Michigan), United States

== See also ==
- St Mary's Cathedral (disambiguation)
