= Diocese of Christchurch =

Diocese of Christchurch may refer to:

- Anglican Diocese of Christchurch, a geographical area of the Anglican Church, in New Zealand
- Roman Catholic Diocese of Christchurch, a geographical area of the Roman Catholic Church, in New Zealand
