= St Joseph's Church, Darfield =

St Joseph's Church
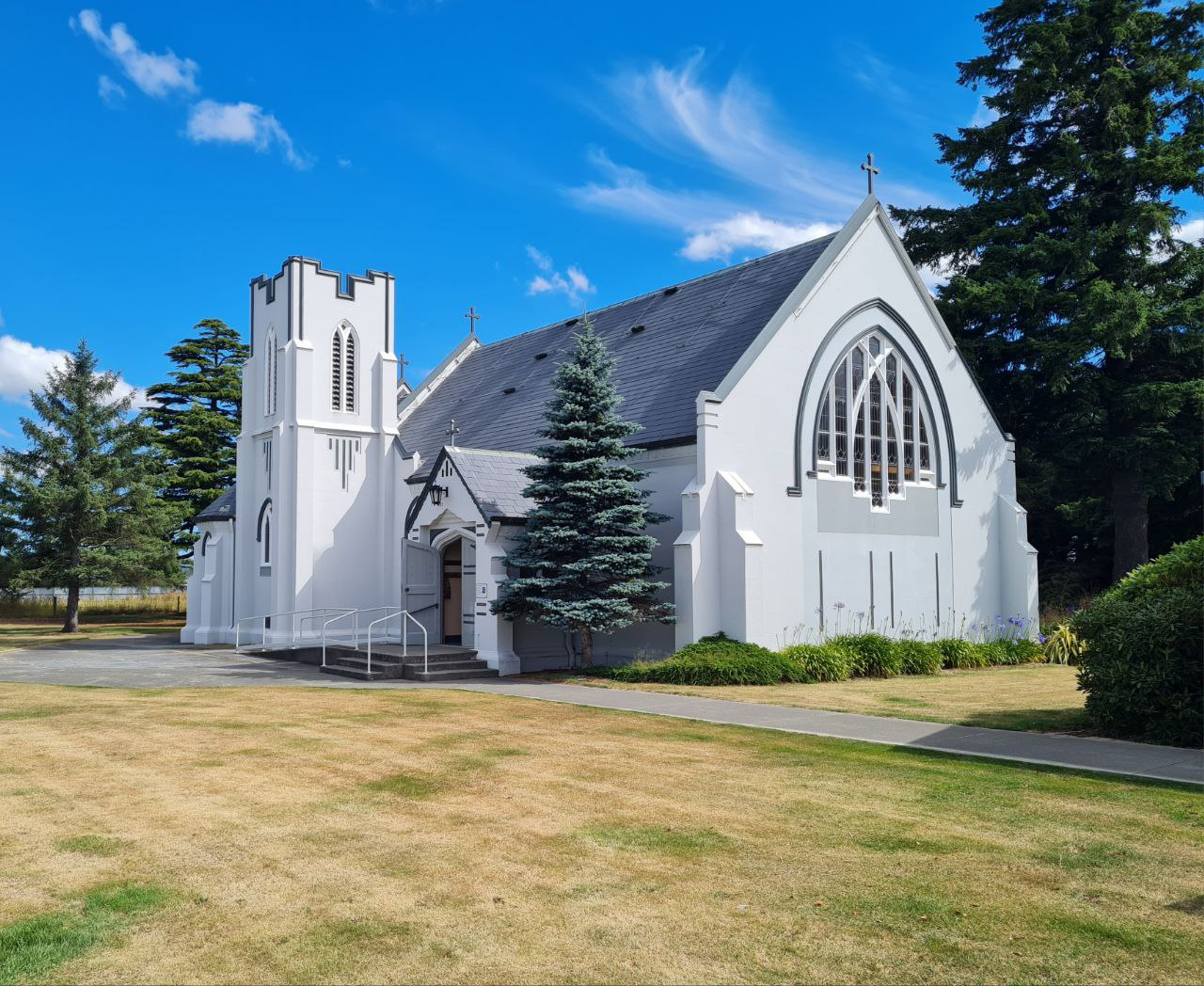
- St Joseph's Church in 2024
- St Joseph's Church
- 43°29′32″S 172°06′32″E
- Location: Darfield
- Country: New Zealand
- Denomination: Roman Catholic

History
- Former name: Church of the Holy Angels
- Status: Church
- Dedication: Saint Joseph
- Dedicated: 11 October 1936 by Bishop Matthew Brodie

Architecture
- Functional status: Active
- Architect: H. Francis Willis
- Architectural type: Church
- Style: Art Deco

Specifications
- Capacity: 350

Administration
- Archdiocese: Wellington
- Diocese: Christchurch
- Parish: Selwyn

Clergy
- Priest: Rev Fr Brian Fennessy

St Joseph's Church, Darfield is a Roman Catholic church located in Darfield, New Zealand. It is one of eight churches in the Christchurch Diocese with its own choir loft, with some others being: St Bede's College Chapel, St Mary's Pro-Cathedral, and Sacred Heart Basilica, Timaru.

== History ==
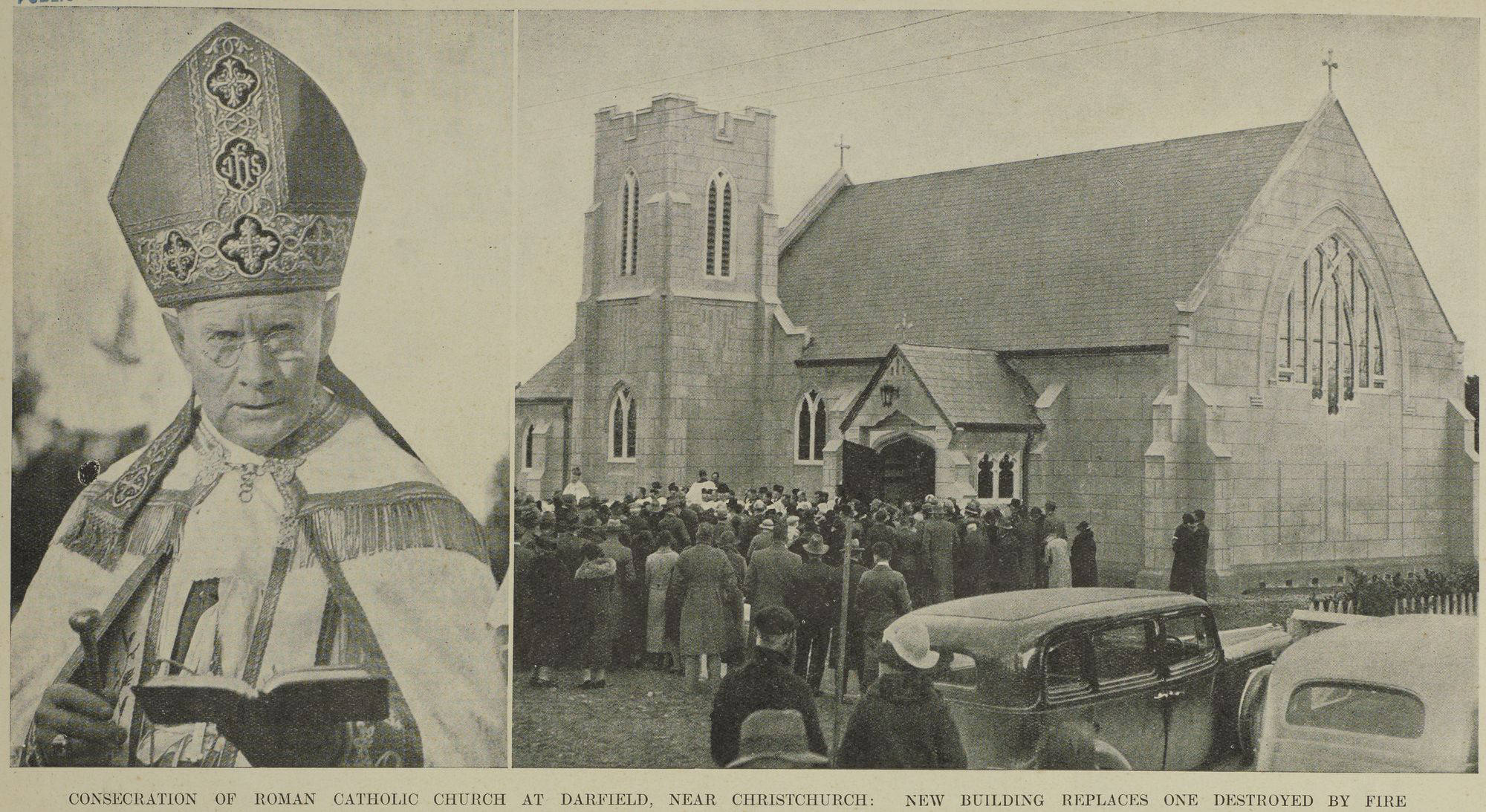
Bishop Brodie consecrating the current St Joseph's Church, July 1937

In 1861, the Reverend Father John Chevier was placed in charge of the areas between the Rangitata and Hurunui Rivers. From 1878, Father Chevier would celebrate Mass once in every three months in the Malvern region, in either road board offices or at Greendale Primary School. The first wooden church (named Church of the Holy Angels) was opened on 31 October 1880 debt-free, on land donated by Mr. Maxwell of Racecourse Hill. In 1888, Darfield was made into its own parish (succeeding from the Lincoln-Leeston parish), with the Reverend Father J.J. O'Donnell serving as its first parish priest. Father O'Donnell oversaw the construction of the presbytery in September 1889 (now demolished) and extensions to the wooden church.

In 1894, the Reverend Father Chastagnan was made parish priest. It was during his time here as parish priest that Peter Clinton donated two acres of land, which included a brick cottage (converted later to the convent) and the construction of St John's School. These both opened in 1899. Both of these original buildings are now privately dwellings. The Sisters of Mercy of Colombo Street, Christchurch were put in charge of the convent and school. Following declining rolls in the latter-half of the 20th century, the convent and school closed in the 1980s.

In 1934, the Reverend Father John McMonagle was appointed parish priest. It was at this time that the original church building was destroyed by fire in April of the same year. The current church was built by J & W Jamieson Ltd, in the art deco style. It is made of poured concrete with a plaster-finish and Oamaru Stone window surrounds. The foundation stone was blessed on 11 October 1936 by Bishop Matthew Brodie and dedicated to Saint Joseph.

In 2017, the church was repainted from its distinctive and often-mocked light-blue to its new colours of 'Double Dolphin Grey' and 'Oil Stone'.

On Pentecost 2020, St Joseph's was amalgamated with Lincoln and Leeston again, with the formation of the Selwyn Parish, having been a part of the Hornby – Darfield parish since 2013.

=== 2010 Canterbury earthquake ===
After a review of New Zealand building codes following the 1931 Hawkes Bay earthquake, the new church was built to handle large seismic events. Due to its structural integrity, the church suffered minor damage from the 2010 Canterbury earthquake, with Masses being celebrated in the parish centre next door, while measures were made to secure the structure of the church.

== Gallery ==
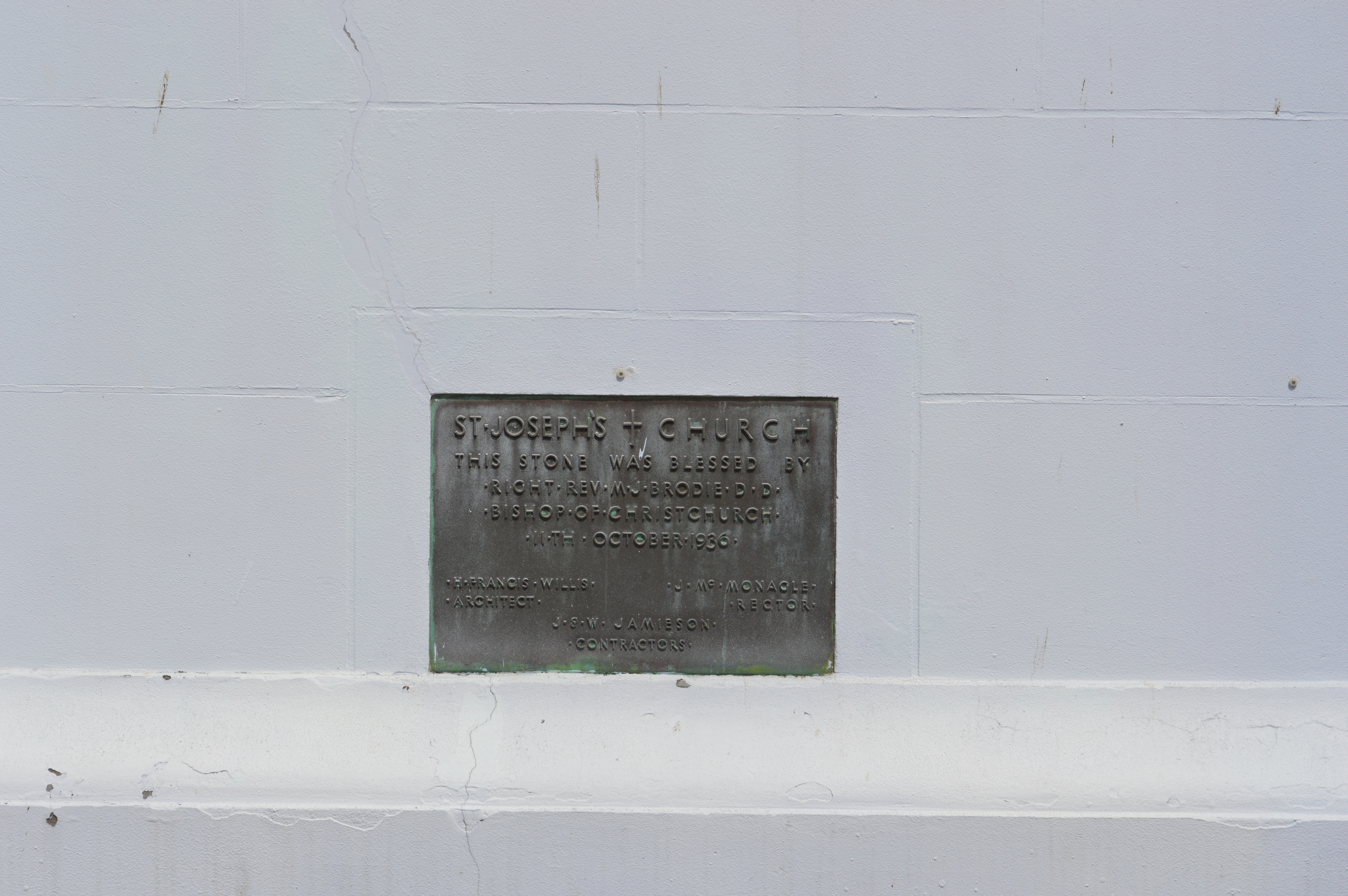
Foundation stone of St Joseph's Church

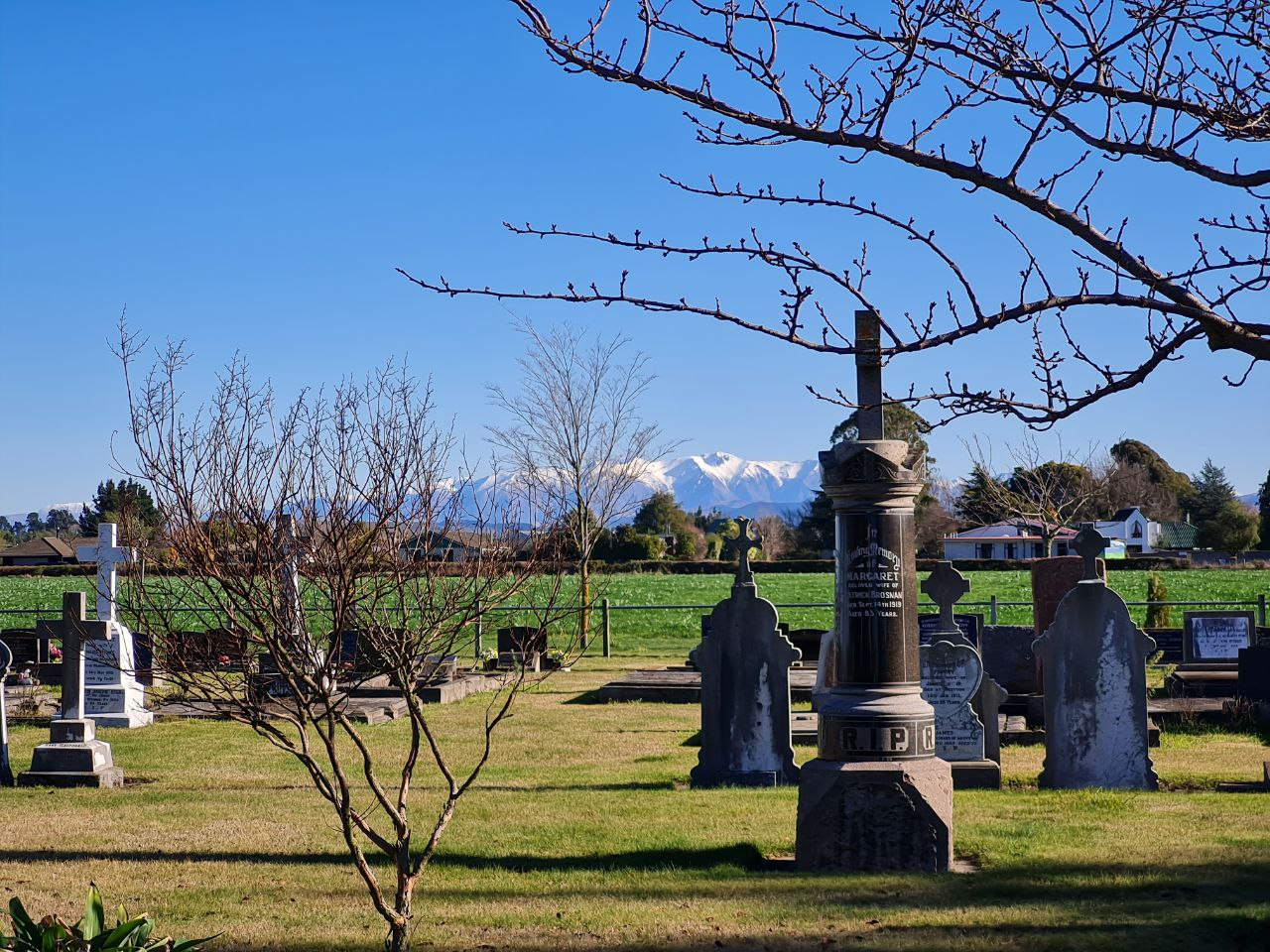
Cemetery at St Joseph's Church, with Mount Hutt in the background

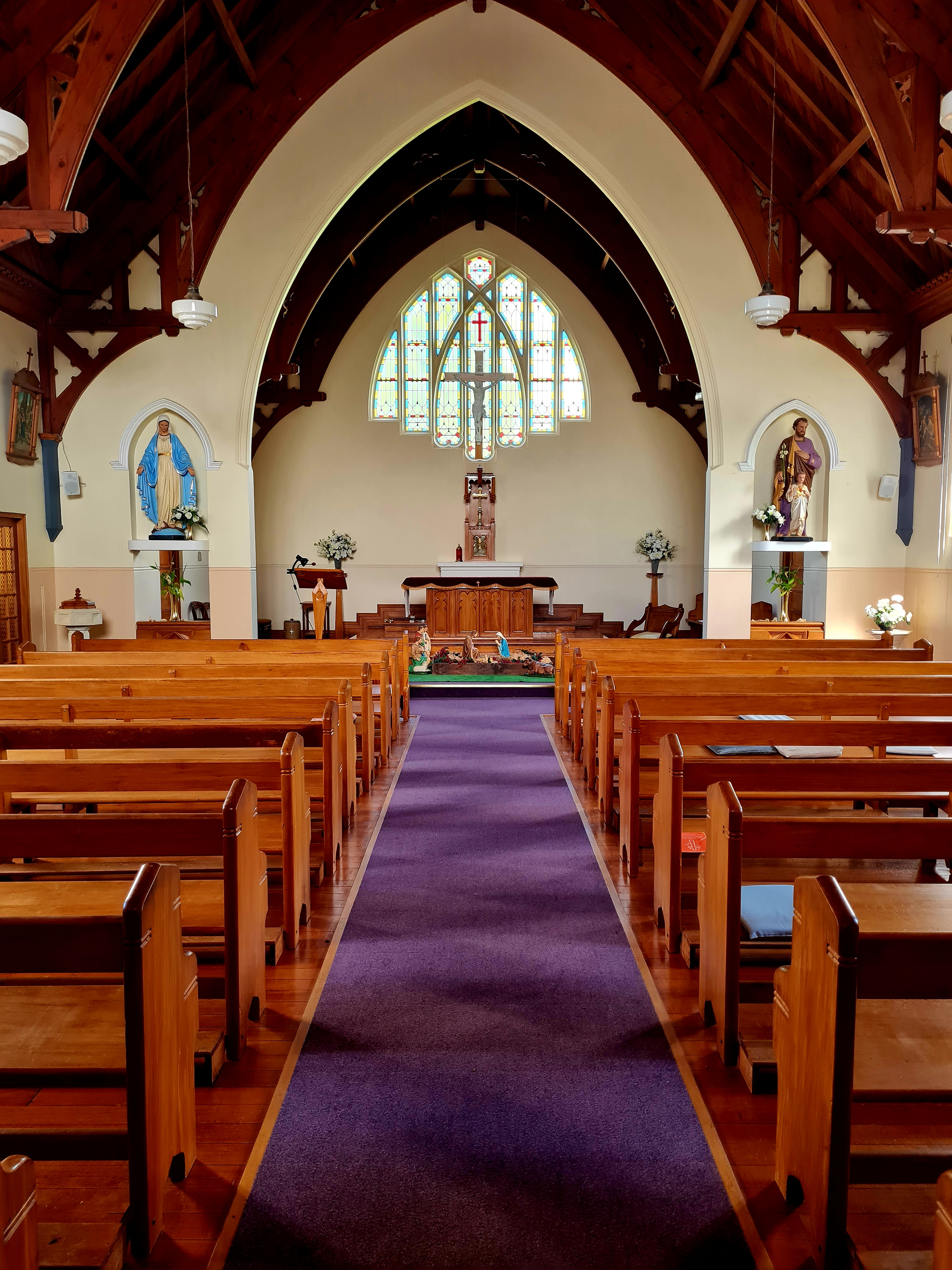
Interior of St Joseph's Church, including the Nativity

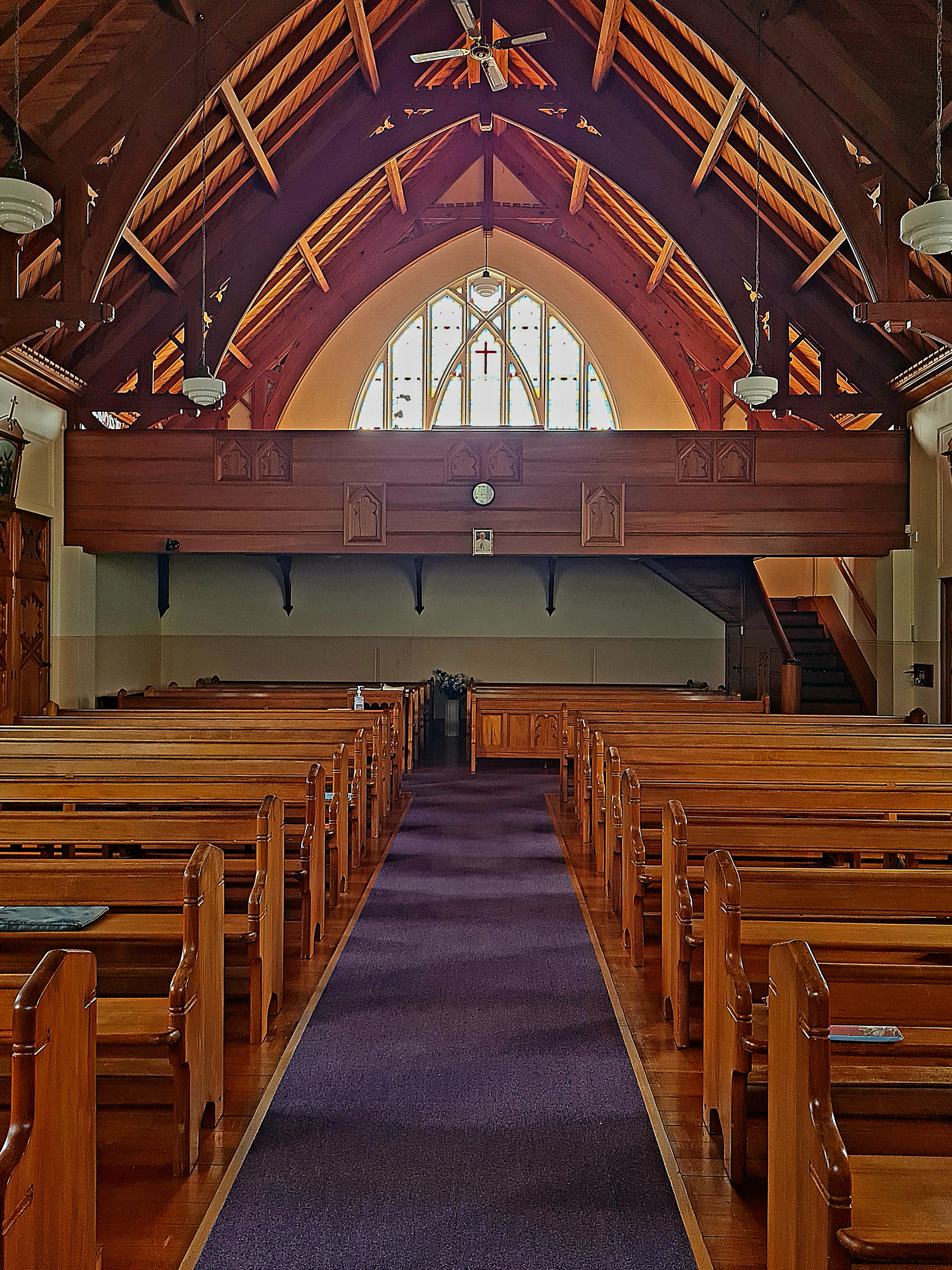
Rear view of the church

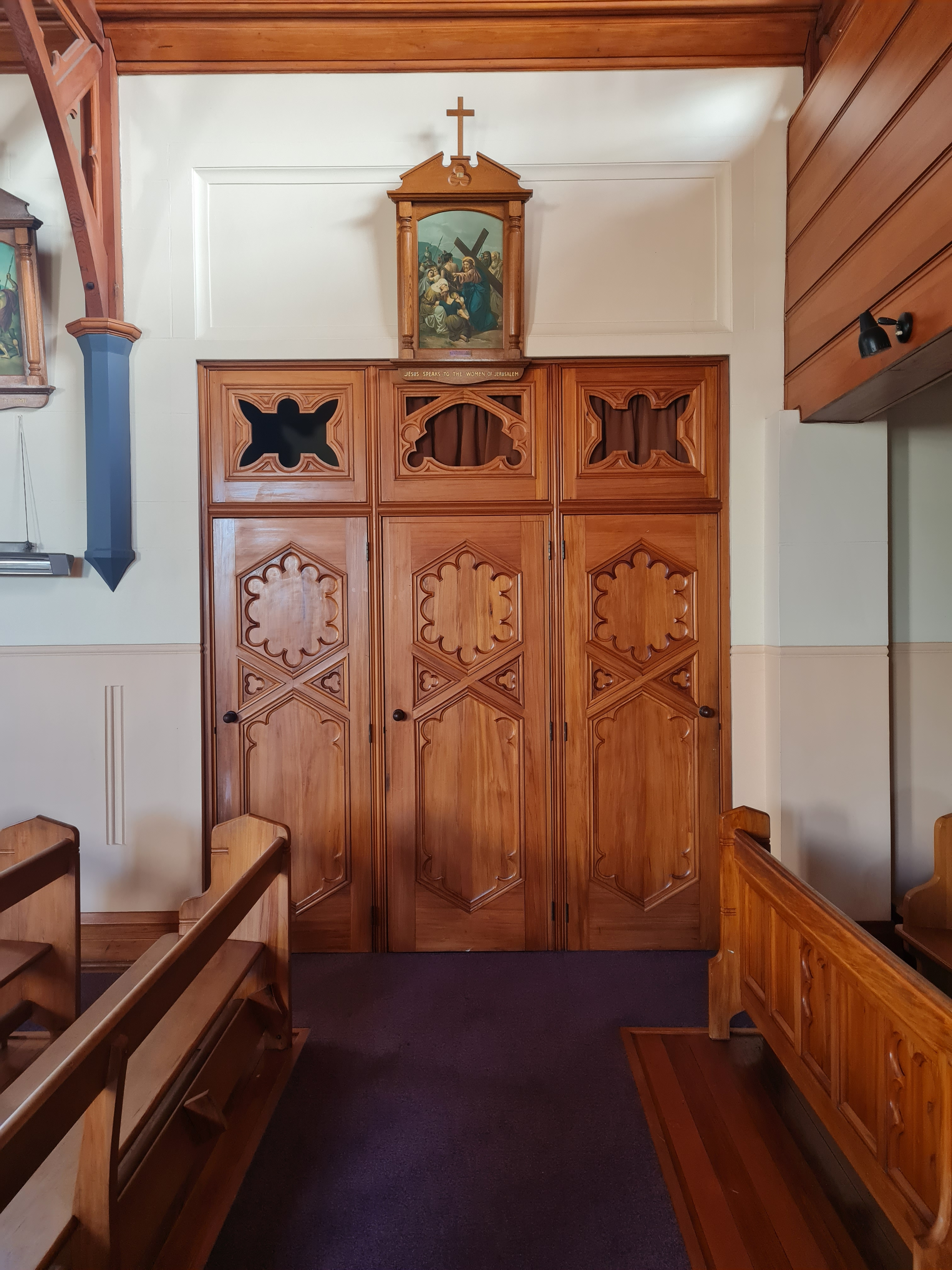
Confessional booths
