= Brian Ashby =

New Zealand Catholic bishop (1923–1988)

Brian Ashby CBE
- 5th Bishop of Christchurch
- Archdiocese: Wellington, New Zealand
- Diocese: Christchurch, New Zealand
- Predecessor: Bishop Edward Joyce
- Previous posts: Co-director, New Zealand Catholic Enquiry Centre

Orders
- Ordination: 1 January 1950, Rome, Italy
- Consecration: 5 August 1964; Wellington, New Zealand by Archbishop McKeefry; Archbishop Liston (Auckland); Auxiliary Bishop Snedden.

Personal details
- Born: 10 November 1923 Belfast, New Zealand
- Died: 5 June 1988 (aged 64) Christchurch, New Zealand
- Education: University of Canterbury

Brian Patrick Ashby CBE (10 November 1923 – 5 June 1988) was the fifth Catholic Bishop of Christchurch, New Zealand. He was appointed by Pope Paul VI on 11 July 1964, resigned the see on 4 July 1985, and died on 5 June 1988. He was the leading New Zealand Catholic bishop in attempting to implement the decrees of the Vatican Council II and he was the leading bishop on social justice issues.

== Early life ==
Ashby was born in Belfast, a northern suburb of Christchurch, in 1923. He received his primary education at St Joseph's Convent, Papanui, and his secondary education at St Bede's College (to which he won a scholarship). In 1941, Ashby studied law at the University of Canterbury while working in a law office. Over the next two years, he served with the Fifth Canterbury Regiment.

When the under-20s were released for further study in 1943, Ashby began his study for the priesthood at Holy Cross College, Mosgiel. In 1946, he was selected by Bishop Lyons for theology studies in Rome where he was ordained on 1 January 1950. In 1951, he completed his doctorate in theology.

== Priesthood ==
Ashby returned to Christchurch and was appointed as assistant priest in the new parish of North Timaru. In 1957 he became secretary to Bishop Joyce, the 4th Bishop of Christchurch. In 1960 Ashby was sent to London to study the techniques of the Catholic Enquiry Centre there. Ashby became the co-director of the New Zealand Catholic Enquiry Centre when it opened in Wellington in 1961. On 11 July 1964, Ashby was appointed as the Fifth Bishop of Christchurch, succeeding Bishop Joyce.

== Episcopacy ==
Ashby was consecrated Bishop at the age of 41 (one of the youngest bishops to take office) on 5 August 1964 in the Cathedral of the Blessed Sacrament, Christchurch by Archbishop McKeefry of Wellington and the co-consecrators Archbishop Liston of Auckland and Bishop Snedden (Auxiliary Bishop of Wellington). Ashby attended the last sessions of the Second Vatican Council, an experience which placed him in an optimum position to help steer the New Zealand church through the difficult transition times following the Council. He tried to renew diocesan structures and he placed great emphasis on making himself accessible to his people.

Ashby became the leading Catholic figure in the area of ecumenism. His work in this area was recognised in 1983 when Pope John Paul II appointed him to the Vatican Secretariat for the Promotion of Christian Unity. In 1983, Ashby was also the first New Zealand bishop to be appointed a member of the second Anglican-Roman Catholic International Commission, and was also chairman of the New Zealand Catholic Ecumenical Commission. He was the first Catholic bishop to preach in an Anglican cathedral in New Zealand and maintained an enduring personal friendship with the Anglican Bishop of Christchurch Bishop Pyatt.

Ashby was the first New Zealand bishop to implement church sanctuary alterations in the wake of the second Vatican Council. The alterations introduced into the Cathedral of the Blessed Sacrament were controversial but Ashby insisted that they followed the Council decrees. In Christchurch, he was pivotal in enabling the construction of the Our Lady of Victories Church in 1968, designed by Charles Thomas to embrace the spirit of Vatican II.

== Social justice concerns ==
Ashby had the role of visionary in the Catholic hierarchy and he became a significant leader in Church and community affairs. His youth, energy and charisma enabled him to take the lead on social justice issues, particularly those involving Māori-Pākehā relations, overseas aid and sporting contacts with South Africa (which he visited, to see for himself the consequences of Apartheid) Both he and his friend, Bishop Pyatt were outspoken critics of the 1981 Springbok Rugby Tour. The effect of Ashby's leadership was visible in 1981, when scarcely a priest in his diocese supported the tour.

Ashby also headed the New Zealand Catholic Commission for Evangelisation, Justice and Development which gave money to HART (Halt All Racist Tours) in 1981 and later to the Waitangi Action Committee. Both donations brought criticism and debate within the Church. Ashby's services to the community were recognised when he was awarded the Queen Elizabeth II Silver Jubilee Medal in 1977, and appointed a Commander of the Order of the British Empire in the 1985 Queen's Birthday Honours. Ashby said that he was a peaceful man but that he "owed it to my integrity to take the stands that I have taken".

== Retirement and death ==
Ashby resigned the see on 4 July 1985 because of a stroke, after serving 21 years as Bishop of Christchurch. During his retirement he was president of the New Zealand Counter-Stroke Support Group. In April 1988, he was diagnosed with terminal cancer and died on 5 June 1988 in the Mary Potter Hospital, Christchurch.

His Requiem Mass was concelebrated before a congregation of 2,000 by bishops from all the New Zealand dioceses (the celebrants included Bishop John Gerry (Auxiliary Bishop of Brisbane). Ashby is interred in Christchurch's Bromley Cemetery.

== See also ==
- Catholic Hierarchy website, Bishop Brian Patrick Ashby (retrieved 25 January 2011).

Catholic Church titles
Preceded by Edward Joyce	Bishop of Christchurch; 1964–1985	Succeeded by Denis Hanrahan
