= Blessed Sacrament Church =

Blessed Sacrament Church or Blessed Sacrament Catholic Church may refer to:

== Canada ==
- Blessed Sacrament Catholic Church (Ottawa)

== Singapore ==
- Blessed Sacrament Church, Commonwealth, Singapore

== United States ==
- Blessed Sacrament Catholic Church, Hollywood, California
- Blessed Sacrament Church (Bridgeport, Connecticut)
- Blessed Sacrament Church (New Rochelle, New York)
- Blessed Sacrament Church (Seattle), Washington

== See also ==
- Cathedral of the Blessed Sacrament (disambiguation)
