= Cathedral of the Blessed Sacrament, Christchurch =

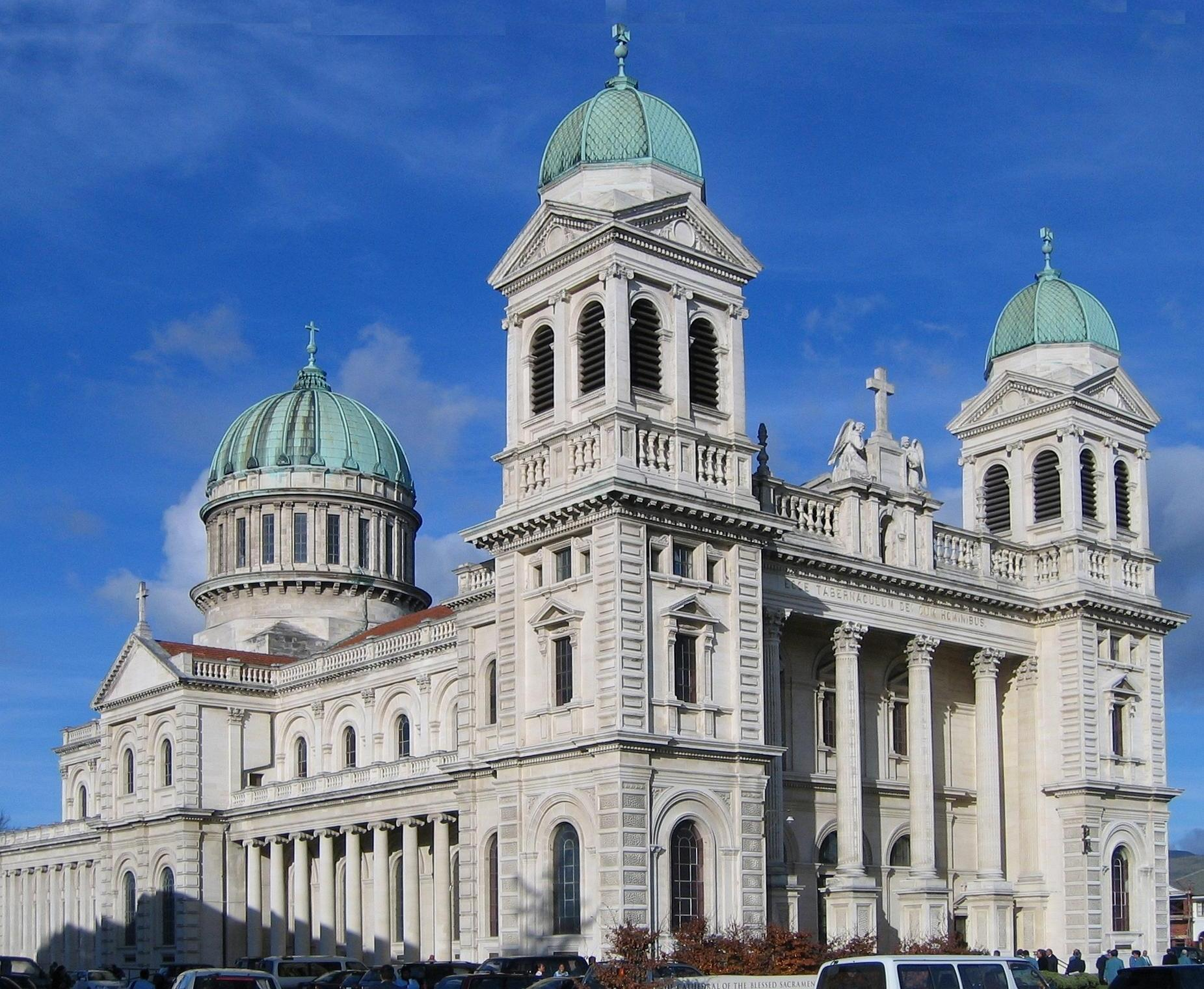
- The Cathedral in 2005

- Location within Christchurch, New Zealand
- 43.5383°S 172.6460°E
- Location: Christchurch Central City
- Country: New Zealand
- Denomination: Catholic

History
- Consecrated: 12 February 1905

Architecture
- Functional status: Demolished
- Heritage designation: Category I (7 April 1983)
- Architect: Francis Petre
- Architectural type: Cathedral
- Style: Renaissance Revival

Administration
- Diocese: Christchurch

Clergy
- Bishop: Michael Gielen (last)

The Cathedral of the Blessed Sacrament, sometimes referred to as the Christchurch Basilica was a Catholic cathedral on Barbadoes Street in central Christchurch, New Zealand. It was the mother church of the Roman Catholic Diocese of Christchurch and seat of the Bishop of Christchurch. It was not a basilica, despite sometimes being referred to as one: the term was used because its design was similar to some European basilicas.

Designed by architect Francis Petre, it was generally held to be the finest renaissance-style building in New Zealand. On 7 April 1983, the building was registered as a Category I heritage item by the New Zealand Historic Places Trust, with the registration number 47. It was regarded as an outstanding example of church architecture in Australasia and was regarded as Petre's best design.

The cathedral was closed after the 4 September 2010 Canterbury earthquake. The February 2011 Christchurch earthquake collapsed the two bell towers at the front of the building and destabilised the dome. The dome was removed, and the rear of the cathedral was demolished.

The decision to demolish the cathedral was made public on 4 August 2019. Demolition work was completed in 2021. On 7 December 2019, the Catholic Bishop of Christchurch, Paul Martin, announced that a new $85 million cathedral was to be completed by 2025 and would accommodate up to 1,000 people. It would be built adjacent to Victoria Square. These plans proved controversial and resulted in an appeal by a group of parishioners to the Vatican's Supreme Tribunal of the Apostolic Signatura in 2023. The signatura subsequently ruled that the appeal would not have jurisdiction over the cathedral replacement process. In April 2024, Bishop Michael announced a new cathedral would be built on the existing Barbadoes Street site.

== History ==
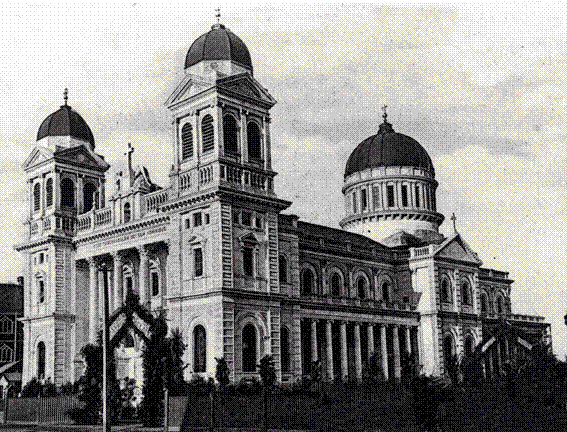
Cathedral of the Blessed Sacrament in the early 20th century

A 24 feet (7.3 m) by 18 feet (5.5 m) wooden chapel was built on Barbadoes Street, south east of the city centre, in October 1860 for newly arrived Marist missionary priests. This chapel was replaced by a larger wooden church designed by Benjamin Mountfort in 1864, which was expanded over the years. This building was designated the pro-cathedral of the newly established Diocese of Christchurch in 1887 by Bishop John Grimes S.M., the first Catholic bishop of Christchurch. This designation indicated that the bishop was planning a new cathedral from the beginning of his tenure. The old building was considered inadequate for the growing population still confined to one city church.

In May 1897 Grimes went to Rome for his ad limina visit. He had several audiences with Pope Leo XIII who gave two gifts for the project. One was a valuable cameo and the other a richly enamelled portrait of the pope, both of which were later sold in a fund-raising bazaar. During his 18 months overseas Grimes travelled in England, Ireland, France, Belgium, and on the return journey, via the Canadian Pacific Railway, in the United States and Canada. Wherever he could command an invitation he preached and begged for his Cathedral, nine times on one Sunday in New York. He arrived back in Christchurch on 10 January 1899 with more than £3,000 for his Cathedral fund (including £800 collected in Ireland).

At that time, Wellington's Sacred Heart Basilica was under construction, with Petre as architect in a branch office there. It is likely that it was in Wellington that Grimes invited Petre to submit a plan for the Christchurch Cathedral. Petre proposed the form of the cathedral. He wrote later that the Roman basilica style was chosen because " ... the proportion of height to length and breadth in the Gothic building is nearly three times that of the Basilica. In fact if a Gothic church were drawn with the width of nave shown in my drawings it would be higher than any Gothic church in the world." Gothic was also considered the greater earthquake risk, and overall, the more expensive. Grimes had the old church removed to Ferry Road, and construction of a new cathedral began in 1901.

Massive efforts began to raise money for the building. Grimes engaged in constant tours of his diocese to raise the cash. Problems with finding suitable stone for the construction of such a large structure caused financial difficulties during the construction, and a special Act was pushed through Parliament by then Premier Richard Seddon in order to aid with the financing of the building. The constant need to find money and to build cheaply led to strained relations between the bishop and the architect. The Catholic community with under 5,000 wage and salary earners in a total Catholic community of 20,570, was fewer in number and overall less advantaged than the Anglican community (whose cathedral took 50 years to build and opened in 1904 at a probable cost of more than £60,000 with a residual debt of £4,000). It "speaks volumes for the value average Catholic placed on their faith" that such small numbers enabled the completion of their cathedral at a total cost of £52,000 with a final debt (10 years after it opened) of less than £5,000. Grimes said at the opening on 12 February 1905, a mere four years after construction began: "No one can claim that our stately Cathedral is the work of the wealthy. It is the fruit of the hard earnings of the poor and the lowly, generous to a sacrifice of their well-won pounds, their shillings and their pence."

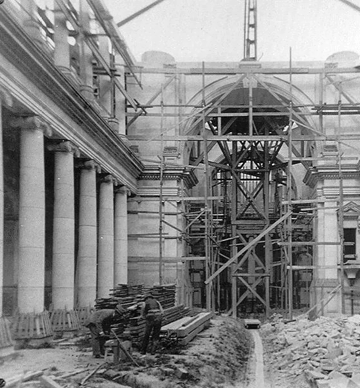
Cathedral under construction. The nave is lined with Ionic columns

== Construction ==
The cathedral was built by Jamieson and Sons who built many other major ecclesiastical and municipal buildings in New Zealand. Petre had previous experience in using concrete, designing dock walls and sewers as a draughtsman. This knowledge allowed Petre to require innovative methods during construction such as pouring heart walls with concrete and then facing with stone. Mass-produced components were widely used, including curved arches made in a purpose built moulding machine. Fifty men were employed on the site, and in excess of 120,000 cubic ft (3400 m³) of stone, 4,000 cubic ft (110 m³) of concrete, and 90 tons of steel were used in the construction. After its completion the cathedral, constructed of concrete sheathed in Oamaru limestone, was widely acclaimed, later causing George Bernard Shaw to describe Petre as a "New Zealand Brunelleschi".

== Architecture ==
Exterior

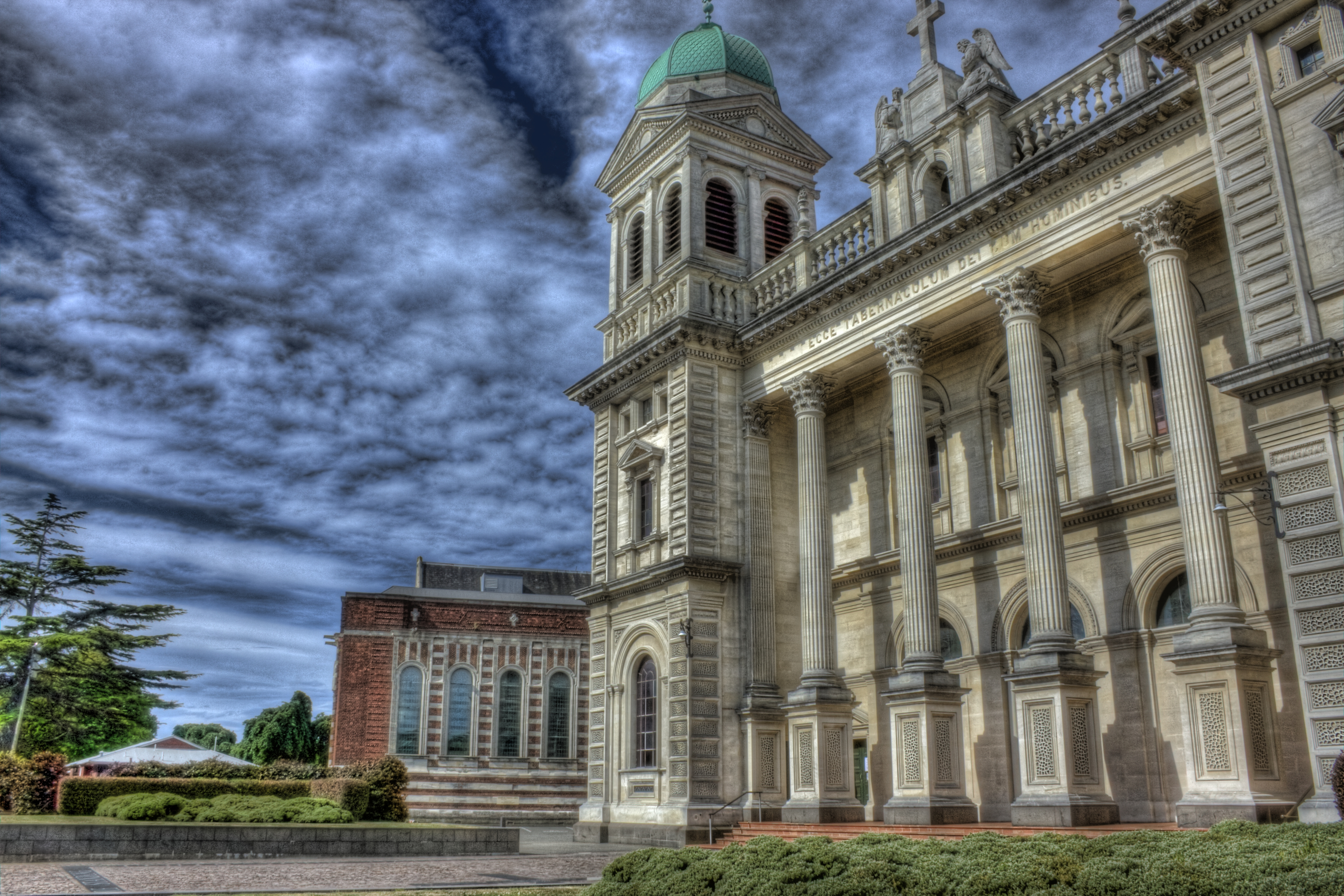
The Cathedral (in 2009) with the Sisters of Our Lady of the Mission Chapel (later demolished in 2011) in the background

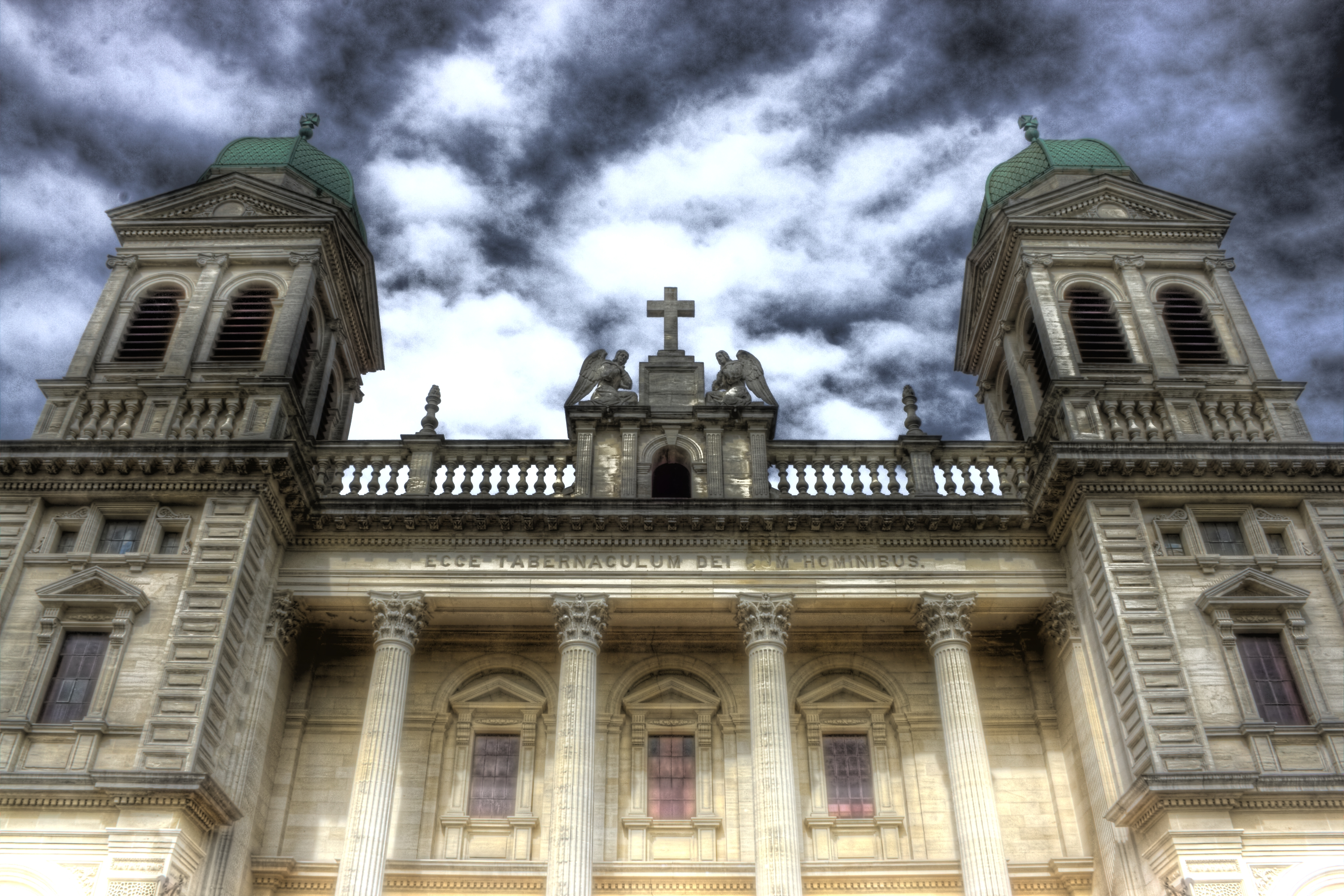
Detail of the front façade (in 2009). The central pediment was in the style of Sebastiano Serlio.

Forsaking 19th-century Gothic, Petre designed the new church in a Renaissance, Italian basilica style, with one major exception. Ignoring Renaissance convention, Petre obtained a greater visual impact by siting the Italianate green copper-roofed dome not above the cross section of the church (as in St. Peter's Basilica in Rome), but directly above the sanctuary. In Petre's opinion, this design element, coupled with the Byzantine apse, added extra grandeur and theatre to the high altar set in the tribune. The nave and chancel roofs were supported by colonnades of Ionic columns and the entrance façade of the cathedral was flanked by twin towers in the manner of many of Europe's great renaissance churches.

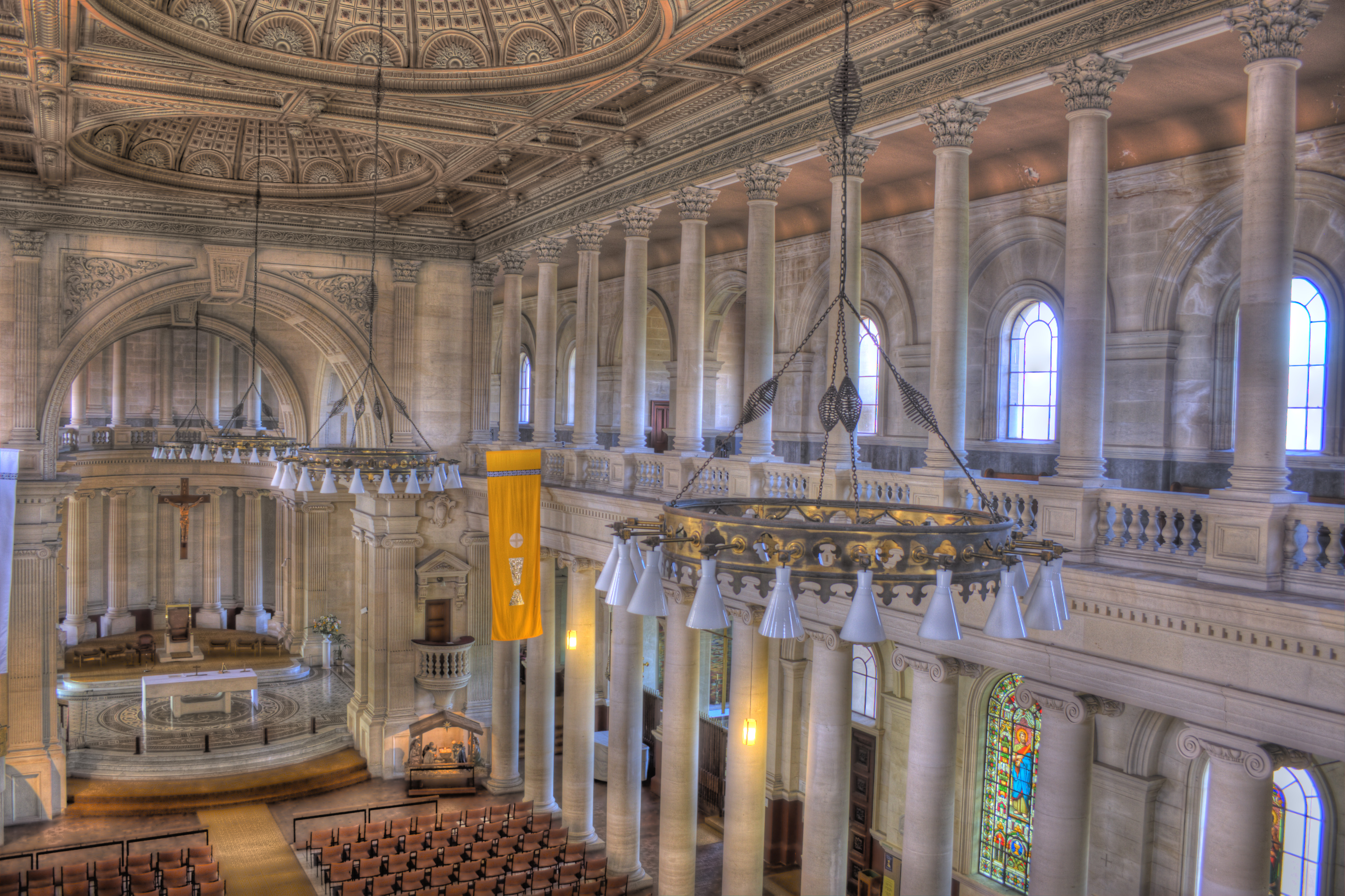
Interior view of the nave and sanctuary of the cathedral in 2009

While often likened, at least in its outward form, to St Paul's Cathedral in London, it is conceivable that the greatest influence behind this structure was Benoit Haffreingue. During Petre's formative years, Haffreingue had been the driving force of the reconstruction of the Cathedral of Notre Dame in Boulogne-sur-Mer, a French church that has a very similar plan to that of the Cathedral of the Blessed Sacrament, including the controversial siting of the dome over the altar rather than the centre of the cathedral. Haffreingue was also the principal of a private Jesuit boarding school for boys (now known as "Le collège Haffreingue-Chanclaire") in Boulogne-sur-Mer. Petre was a student at this school in 1860–186, during Heffreingue's tenure. The building was also said by some to be based on the 19th-century Church of Saint-Vincent-de-Paul, Paris, to which it bore some striking similarities. The similarities to another great French church, Saint-Sulpice, Paris (17th century), have also been remarked upon.

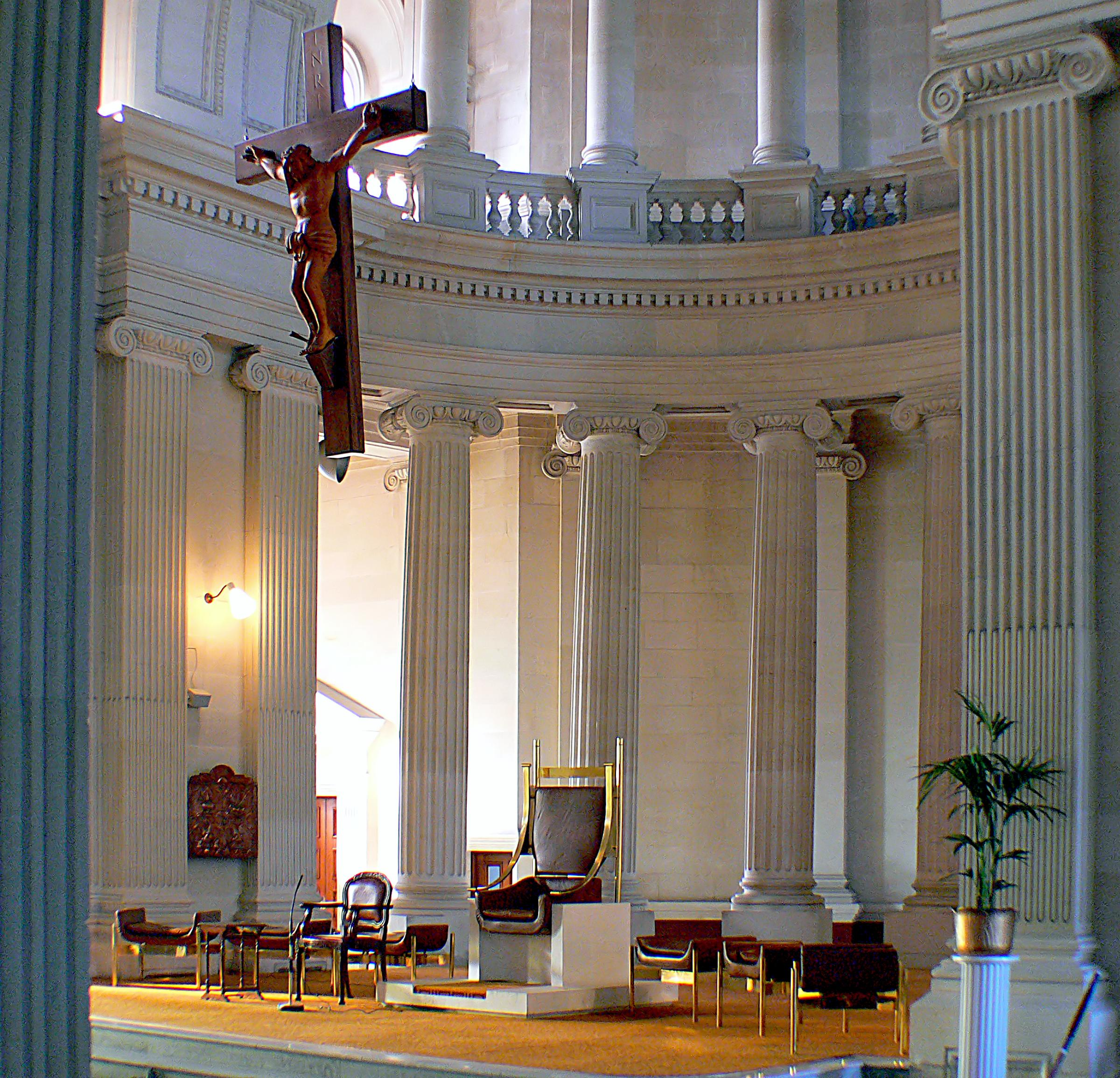
Cathedra in the chancel (2007)

One commentator said that the exterior of the cathedral was probably the most complete and consistent of all Petre's churches. "The majesty of the dome was best seen from the rear, and from most parts of the city it registered powerfully above the Christchurch flatness in a manner reminiscent of Brunelleschi's dome in Florence". George Bernard Shaw during his 1934 visit was unimpressed with Gilbert Scott's Anglican cathedral but generous in his praise of Petre's Catholic one. "In fact it was Shaw who was one of the first to open local eyes to the quality of this building." In 1970 under Bishop Ashby, "years of grime deposited from the [then] nearby railway station and gasworks were cleaned off and restoration work was carried out." "The great joy of the cathedral, however, is the interior. Petre's handling of natural light is as sure as ever, the nave and sanctuary are suffused with daylight. The fine Corinthian and Ionic columns down each side of the nave are a development of the design of St Patrick's Basilica, Oamaru, here doubled in height, for obviously single columns in this great nave would have required enormous girth. The sanctuary dome is undoubtedly the climax of the interior; it is here that the full power of the design is unleashed. This was Petre's finest achievement in forty years of practice. Fascinating vistas are gained through the arches which transmit the enormous weight of the dome to the four massive piers. These are decorated with subtle flutings, a fresh variation on an ancient theme. In this sanctuary the liturgy can be seen as drama, and it receives a fitting setting for its movement and colour".

== Earthquakes ==
The 2010 Canterbury earthquake, a magnitude 7.1 earthquake on 4 September 2010, resulted in the closure of the cathedral to the public indefinitely, to allow for seismic strengthening and restoration. Masses were not celebrated at the cathedral from the September earthquake, but took place at other nearby locations such as the chapel of the adjacent Music Centre. However, although his Requiem Mass was celebrated at St Mary's Pro-Cathedral, Bishop Cunneen was buried in the cathedral.

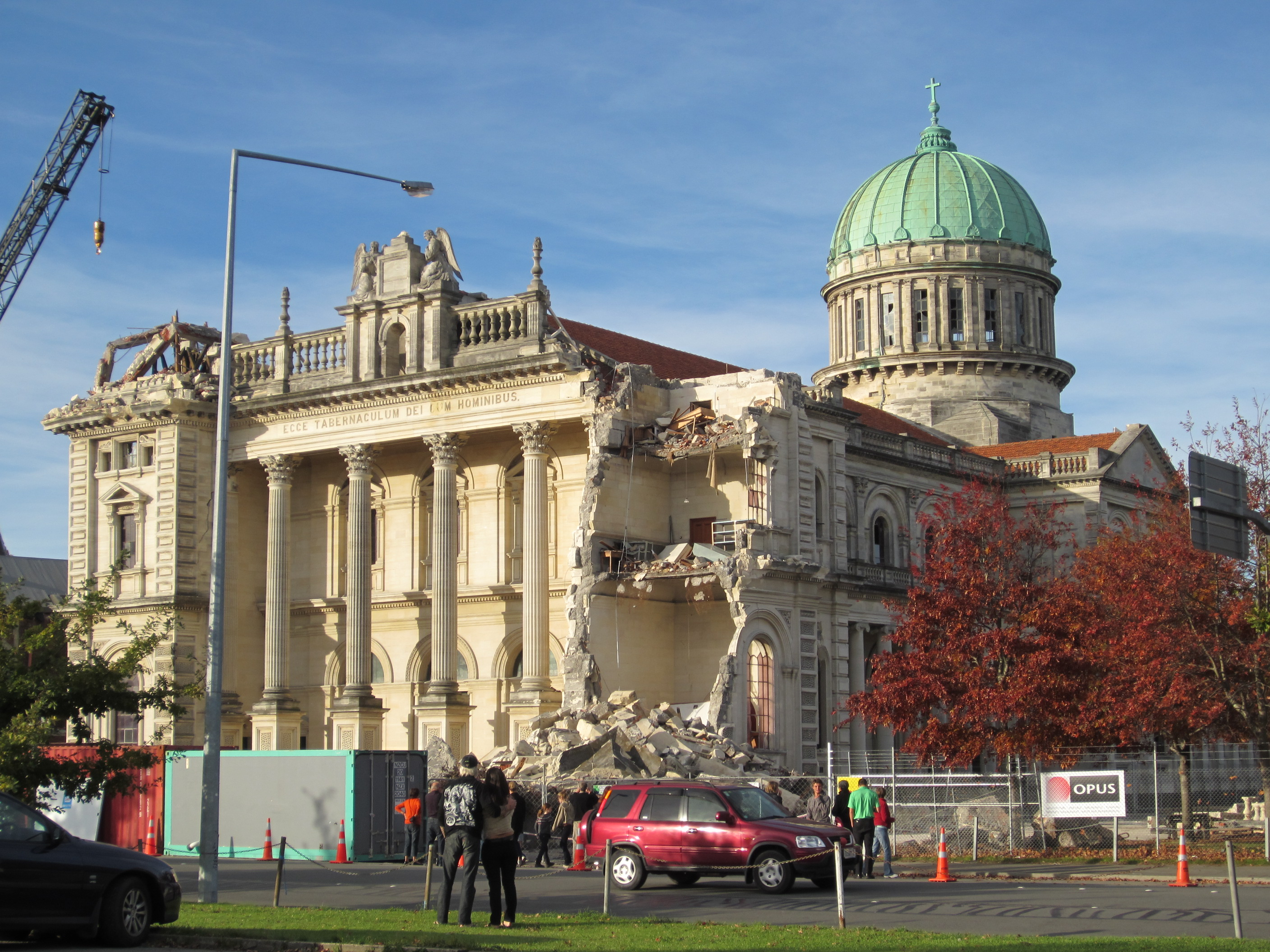
Damage from the February 2011 earthquake

A magnitude 6.3 earthquake on 22 February 2011 caused considerable damage to the cathedral. The cathedral administrator, Charles Drennan, said that engineers had indicated that it was unlikely the building could be saved. The two bell towers at the front of the building collapsed, bringing much of the front façade down with them, with large blocks of masonry destroying vehicles in front of the building. There was also major cracking evident around the cathedral's main dome. Stained glass windows, which had survived the 2010 earthquake and some 4,000 aftershocks, were also "in ruins". Drennan said that workers repairing damage to the building caused by the earlier earthquake escaped, as did a custodian who was in the cathedral at the time.

The building has been described as "quite humbled". On the collapsed front, "all that was left at the top was a cross piercing the sky – two angels abreast keeping vigil". Drennan and three other priests were forced to evacuate the cathedral rectory by authorities. This was not because of any damage to that building, but because authorities wanted to clear the central city area of people for security reasons. Adjoining parts of Catholic Cathedral College were threatened by the severely damaged cathedral and the college had to shift to St Thomas of Canterbury College under a "site-sharing" arrangement.

=== Reaction ===
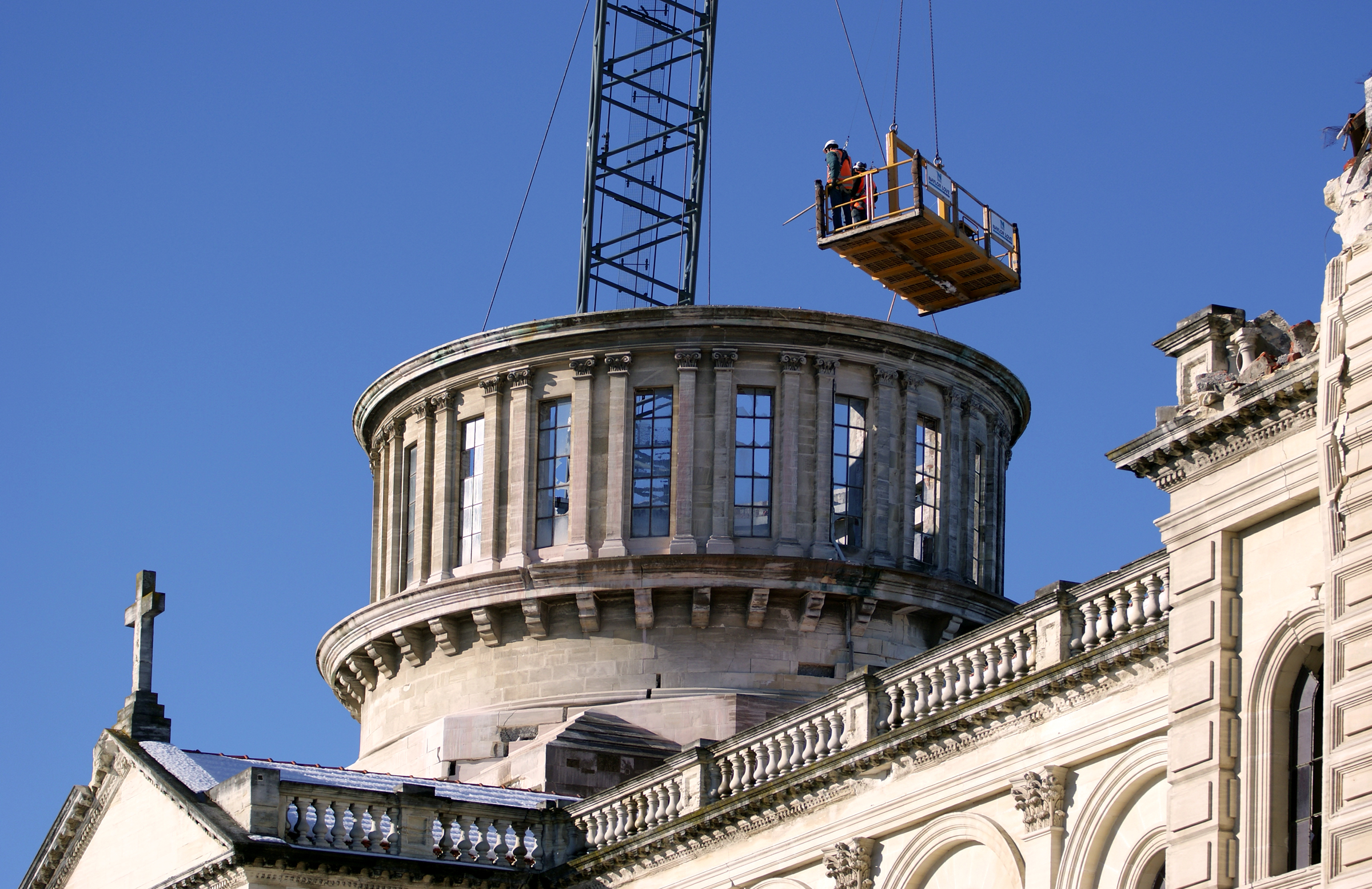
Removal of the dome, 27 July 2011

On 2 March, Bishop Barry Jones decided that the dome of the cathedral would be removed after an inspection revealed another large earthquake could topple it completely. An engineer's report showed that the cathedral's dome was forcing weight-bearing structures outwards and that another earthquake like the magnitude 6.3 on 22 February would topple the dome. The bishop said that the removal of the dome would begin as soon as possible, but other work had to be completed and equipment assembled before work could begin. The removal of the dome would be done by cranes at a distance from the site because of the risk of collapse. The bishop also said that no decisions would be made about the future of the building until a detailed engineering report was generated after the dome has been removed. Until the February earthquake, Masses were being held at the Catholic Cathedral College assembly hall near the cathedral, but the bishop said he did not know where future services would be held. He said: "We don't know anything, all we're concerned about now is protecting human life."

On 5 March, the Minister of Earthquake Recovery, Gerry Brownlee, told a media briefing that if he had his way, most of Christchurch's heritage buildings would be demolished but that he would like to see resources go into rebuilding the ChristChurch Cathedral, the Catholic Basilica, the Canterbury Provincial Chambers and the Christchurch Arts Centre – "but that's it – There will be a few others perhaps, but those would be the most iconic buildings that Christchurch residents would want to see rebuilt. They won't be put back the way they were. They will need to have a great deal of strengthening put into them and it will be quite a long consideration as to how those things might be done."

After the June 2011 Christchurch earthquake, the dome of the cathedral was removed. The outer copper dome was cut into segments and was finally removed on 26 July and the internal decorative dome was removed intact in August. The damaged rear of the cathedral was demolished to a low level in October. Meanwhile, in August, Catholic Cathedral College was able to reoccupy its buildings.

=== Statue and consecration of Christchurch to Mary ===
A statue of the Virgin Mary that was in the north tower of the cathedral turned 180 degrees during the February earthquake so that instead of facing into the cathedral it was facing out. It became a quake survival symbol after the about face as it looked out of a tower window over the battered city. On 29 May 2011 the statue was carried around the damaged cathedral, once again the centrepiece for a religious ceremony. After circumnavigating the cathedral grounds, the 200-strong congregation witnessed the Bishop of Christchurch consecrating the city of Christchurch to Mary. The statue had been damaged while being removed from the tower, but was repaired by Carmelite nuns in time for the procession, which was organised by the Sons of the Most Holy Redeemer.

=== Options ===
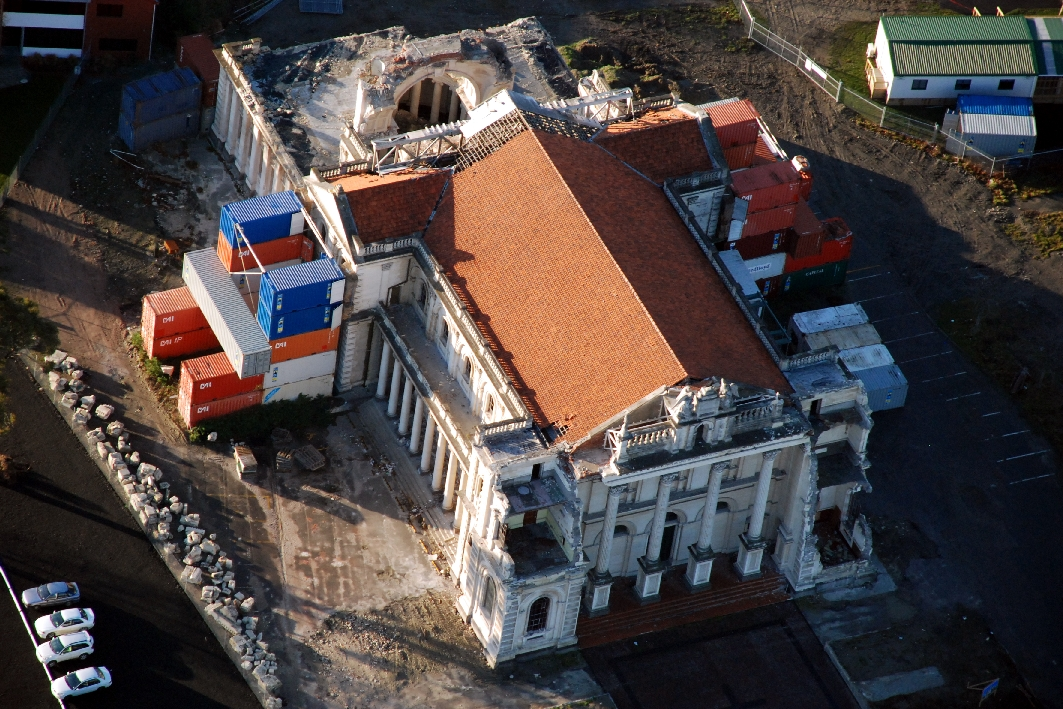
Aerial view of the cathedral in July 2012, with the dome now removed

Full restoration of the cathedral was expected to cost more than $100 million and construction of a new cathedral $40 million.

Meanwhile, the decision to demolish the Anglican cathedral had caused great controversy. One commentator asked why there is "relative silence over the future of the Basilica for the Catholics who are allowed to get on with their decision-making processes in relative peace, while the Anglicans have to fight it out in the streets and letters to the editor pages of The Press? I suspect there remains in Christchurch the notion of old that the Catholics are still regarded as peripheral, parked over on the edge of town in an area back in the day that was next to the gas works that turned the cathedral a nicotine yellow. Now the distance from the heart of the city seems to have at last paid off as the Basilica's counterpart in the Square can't get out of the ring".

By 7 May 2012, the Catholic diocese had spent about $3 million deconstructing the damaged parts of the cathedral, on cleaning and saving and numbering stones, windows and unique elements, and on transporting material, at night, to a storage facility in west Christchurch. The facility and shrink-wrapping allowed the individually numbered objects to be kept in the "best condition possible" with a view to their use in any rebuild or as a guide for the design of new elements. The cathedral's fate was considered in the context of a total of 20 damaged churches in the Christchurch Catholic Diocese. The diocese also had to deal with insurance issues and decisions on other assets, which included schools, retirement villages, church halls and presbyteries, as well as churches.

In May 2015, it was announced that further deconstruction of the front and sanctuary areas of the building would be undertaken with a view to investigating the retention of the nave area (which appeared to be relatively undamaged) and its incorporation into a new building. This redevelopment, if it proceeded, would cost about $45 million and take four years to complete. In October 2016, the result of this investigation was announced. The cathedral could be saved and gradually rebuilt, but at a cost $100 million. The final decision on the future of the building was to be made by the new Bishop of Christchurch, Paul Martin, appointed in 2018.

=== Replacement ===
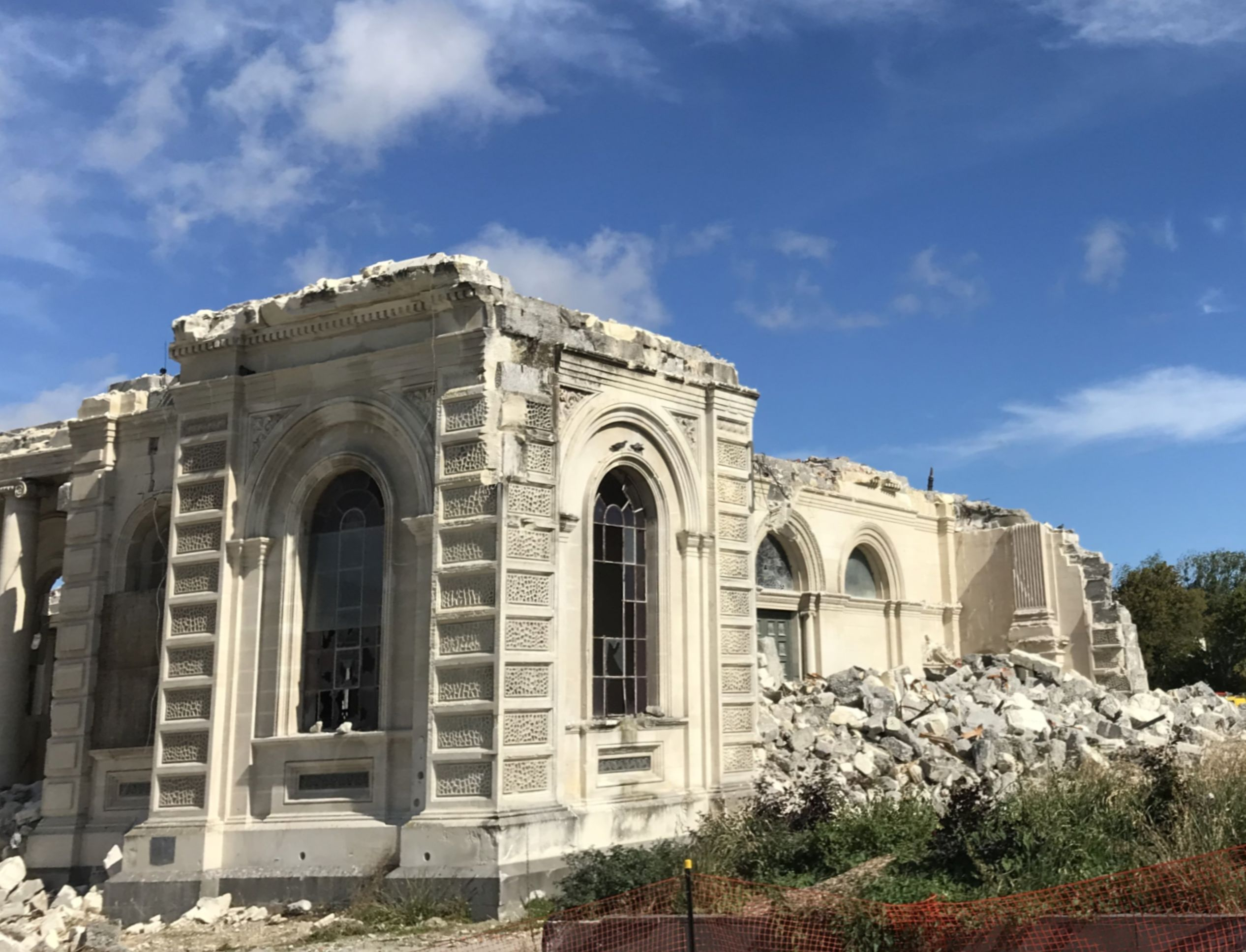
Demolition status in early January 2021

On 4 August 2019, Martin announced that the Cathedral of the Blessed Sacrament would be demolished. The then current cost of a complete reconstruction of the cathedral was $149 million. The option of just saving the nave and rebuilding on a modest scale was estimated to cost in excess of $91 million. The bishop said that these costs were not bearable by the diocese. He said that the diocese had spent millions of dollars investigating the site and the building and had examined more than 20 different possibilities, but ultimately "a functional and financial solution" could not be found and the 113-year-old earthquake-damaged basilica would therefore be demolished. On Saturday 7 December 2019, Martin announced a new $85 million Catholic cathedral to be completed by 2025, to accommodate up to 1,000 people, and to be built adjacent to Victoria Square. The project would also include a hotel precinct of up to four hotels, a relocated St Mary's Primary School, multi-storey car park building, hub for community activities, church offices and residential accommodation for clergy. Payment for the development would include $45m from the church's quake insurance claim for a cathedral. The bishop said that the "sizeable" funding shortfall would be met through fundraising and the sale of excess property and assets, including potentially selling the old Barbadoes St site. The search for potential architects and designs would begin in 2020. Demolition of the cathedral began on 1 September 2020 and was expected to take a year to complete.

These plans proved controversial and resulted in an appeal by a group of parishioners to the Vatican's Supreme Tribunal of the Apostolic Signatura in 2023. The signatura subsequently ruled that the appeal would not have jurisdiction over the cathedral replacement process. In April 2024, Bishop Michael announced a new cathedral would be built on the existing Barbadeos Street site.

== Choir and orchestra ==
Cathedral of the Blessed Sacrament Music
- Choir and orchestra
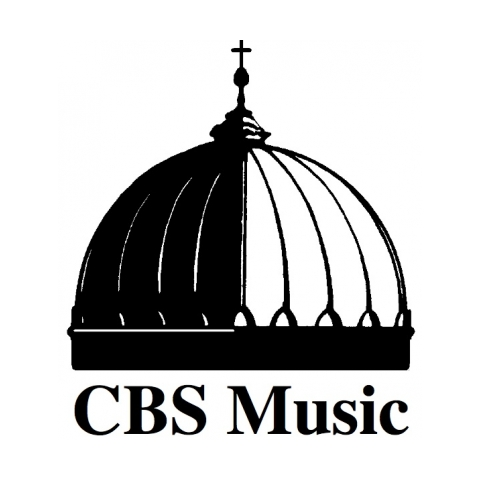
- Short name: CBS Music
- Founded: 1969
- Location: Christchurch, New Zealand
- Concert hall: Cathedral of the Blessed Sacrament (1969–2010), St Mary's Pro-Cathedral (2010–)
- Principal conductor: Don Whelan
- Website: www.cathedral.org.nz

The Cathedral of the Blessed Sacrament Music (CBS Music) are the primary music providers for Masses at St Mary's Pro-Cathedral. Before the earthquake, they were based at the Cathedral of the Blessed Sacrament. The CBS is an affiliate of the RSCM New Zealand Canterbury Branch.

The first formation of a choir, under the leadership of Don Whelan, was at Christ The King, Burnside. Whelan started working with Dutch immigrants, who come from a choral culture, understood the art of singing in parts well. Whelan soon became a well-trained organist, organising cantors and the choir. Before Easter 1969, an organist was needed for the services at the Cathedral of the Blessed Sacrament. Whelan took this opportunity, and the CBS Choir was formed.

During their first international tour to Europe in 1990–1991, the CBS was given status as cultural ambassadors by the New Zealand Government. During their third European tour, the choir were invited to lead the singing during the Papal Midnight Mass in celebration of the inauguration the Holy Year of Jubilee Due to the 2010 Canterbury earthquake, the Cathedral of the Blessed Sacrament was badly damaged, leading it to be closed for the foreseeable future. Masses moved next door to the chapel. During the 2011 Christchurch earthquake, the cathedral partially collapsed, as well as the chapel and music centre being badly damaged and demolished afterwards. The CBS built a new state of the art facility at St Mary's Pro-Cathedral in which to house their music library, offices and a practice hall.

Despite the Canterbury earthquakes, the choir and orchestra were still able to go ahead with their annual New Zealand tours, as well as going on their first Asian tour in 2012 and their fifth Australian and European tours in 2013 and 2015, respectively. In October 2019, members and associates of the CBS celebrated 50 years under the leadership of Don Whelan, with a luncheon at the Rydges Hotel in Central Christchurch.

In March 2020, the Catholic bishops of New Zealand ordered the temporary suspension of Masses and churches to be temporarily closed due to the COVID-19 pandemic in NZ. Shortly afterwards, the rest of the CBS program was halted due to the national lockdown. The Wednesdays at One music programme, concerts, annual music events, and the appearances at Masses were suspended for the first time in its history. On 14 June, the CBS was able to begin their program, celebrating the cathedral's feast of Corpus Christi. The Wednesdays at One music programme resumed in July 2020.

=== Concert programme ===
Wednesdays at One is a weekly concert series hosted by the CBS. This entails local and national musicians of all ages to perform the works of many composers on many different instruments. Annual concerts of Bach's St John Passion and Handel's Messiah are performed on Good Friday and in mid-December, respectively. In June, during the Diocese's Feast Day (Cathedral Feast of Corpus Christi) celebrations, a concert is given, where usually a Mass is performed. In 2019, John Ritchie's Missa Corpus Christi was performed, as well as MacMillan's Hymn to the Blessed Sacrament and Mendelssohn's Verleih uns Frieden.

On the first Sunday of each month (excluding January), orchestral Masses are performed with the choir. Every other Sunday, the choir sings contemporary, polyphonic, and Gregorian chant compositions. Orchestral Masses with the choir are also performed at the Christmas Vigil and Midnight Mass.

=== Personnel ===
Below is a list of key personnel.

Director of Music:

- Don Whelan (1969–present)

Assistant Director of Music:

- Simon Mace (2018–2019)
- Nicholas Sutcliffe (2019–present)

Cantor:

- Wally Enright

Concertmaster:

- Natalia M. Lomeiko

== Burials ==
- John Grimes, First Catholic Bishop of Christchurch.
- Edward Joyce, Fourth Catholic Bishop of Christchurch.
- John Jerome Cunneen, Eighth Catholic Bishop of Christchurch.

== See also ==
- Christchurch Catholic Cathedral, the proposed replacement for the cathedral
- St Mary's Pro-Cathedral, Christchurch, the temporary replacement for the cathedral
- List of basilicas in New Zealand
- List of buildings by Francis Petre

== Bibliography ==
- F.W. Petre at archINFORM, based on the Dictionary of New Zealand Biography Volume Two (1870–1900), 1993) retrieved 7 May 2008.
- O'Meeghan, Michael (1988). Held Firm by Faith: A History of the Catholic Diocese of Christchurch 1840–1987. Catholic Diocese of Christchurch.
- John Simpson, "A Building of Splendour that inspired greatness and survived all animosities", The Press, 8 February 1980, p. 11.
- John Simpson, "Difficulties after building begins", The Press, 9 February 1980, p. 12.
- E J McCoy, "The Blessed Sacrament Cathedral, Christchurch" in the chapter, "Petre Churches", Historic Buildings of New Zealand: South Island, Metheun for the New Zealand Historic Places Trust, 1983, pp. 153–155 and 158–159.
