= Music Centre of Christchurch =

Coordinates: 43°32′16″S 172°38′46″E

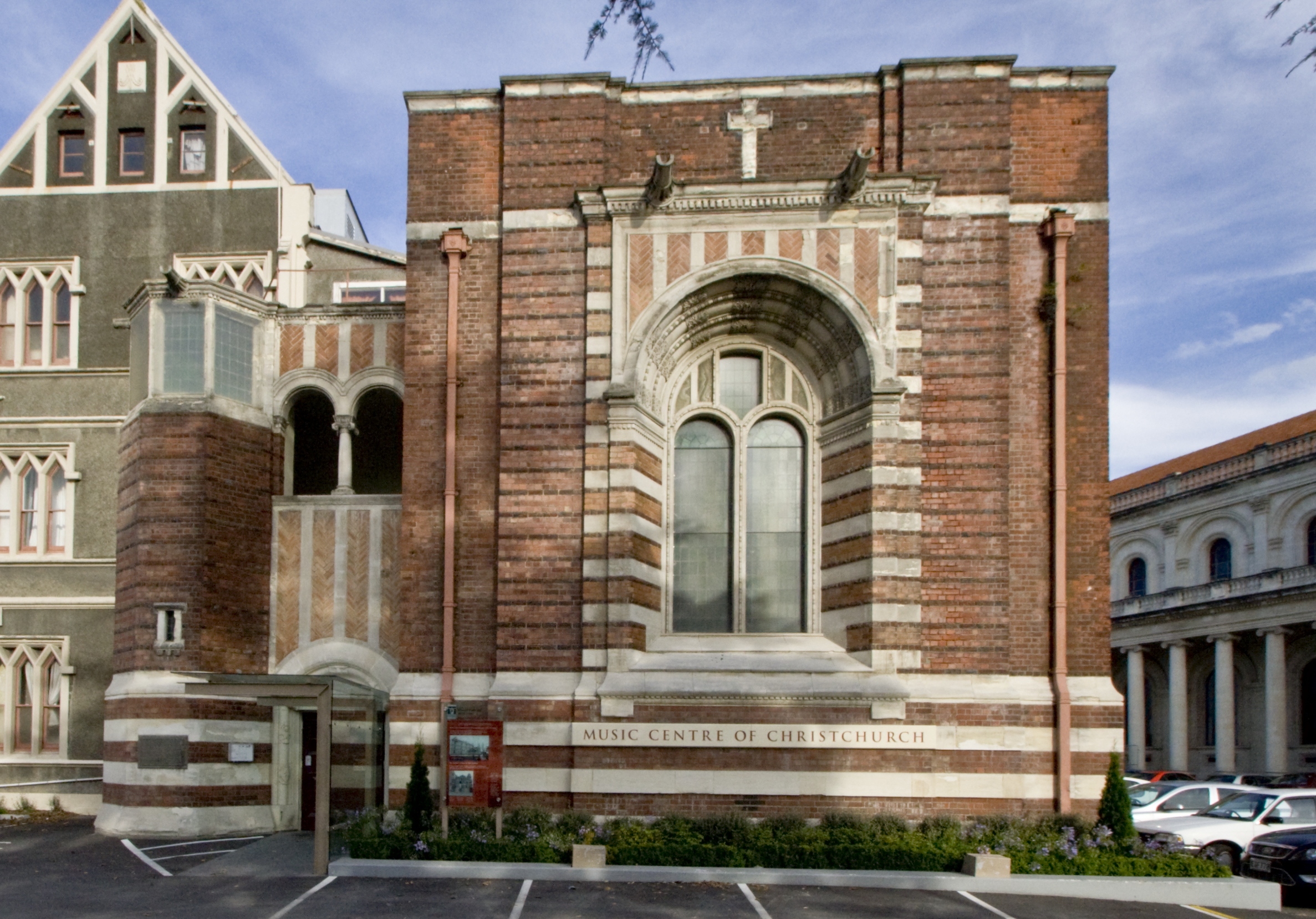
The chapel fronting Barbadoes Street, which was the performance venue of the Music Centre, in 2007

The Music Centre of Christchurch was a facility for music organisations in the central city of Christchurch, New Zealand. It was established in 1994 and provided office, rehearsal, tuition and performance space for a wide range of music groups. The centre was adjacent to the Cathedral of the Blessed Sacrament and consisted of a group of four heritage buildings formerly the convent of the Sisters of Our Lady of the Missions and Sacred Heart College, a Catholic secondary school for girls founded in 1881 which was amalgamated with Xavier College, a neighbouring Catholic boys' school to form Catholic Cathedral College in 1987.

The chapel, built in 1907, was designed by Joseph Munnings while he was in partnership with Samuel Hurst Seager and Cecil Wood. It is one of the only examples of Byzantine revival architecture in the Southern Hemisphere. The three-storey main convent building, designed in 1882 by Francis Petre is the oldest building in the complex. It was opened in 1894. The Portery was added in 1902 to extend the convent. It was restored with the girls’ boarding hostel for Sacred Heart College, constructed in 1930. Both buildings became part of the music centre in 2004. The chapel was the primary performance space.

The buildings were badly damaged in the 22 February 2011 Christchurch earthquake. Two of the centre's four buildings sustained significant earthquake damage. The three-storey main building has been demolished. It was hoped that the music centre would reopen on the existing site but it moved to Antigua Street to a purpose-built building called The Piano.

The Christchurch School of Music, one of the tenants of the Music Centre, had about 800 students attending weekly classes taught by 80 teachers at the Music Centre and the adjacent Catholic Cathedral College. Those classes were now being held at Christchurch Boys' High School and Rangi Ruru Girls' School.
