= Roman Catholic Diocese of Christchurch =

Catholic diocese in New Zealand

Coordinates: 43°32′19″S 172°38′46″E

Diocese of Christchurch Dioecesis Christopolitana
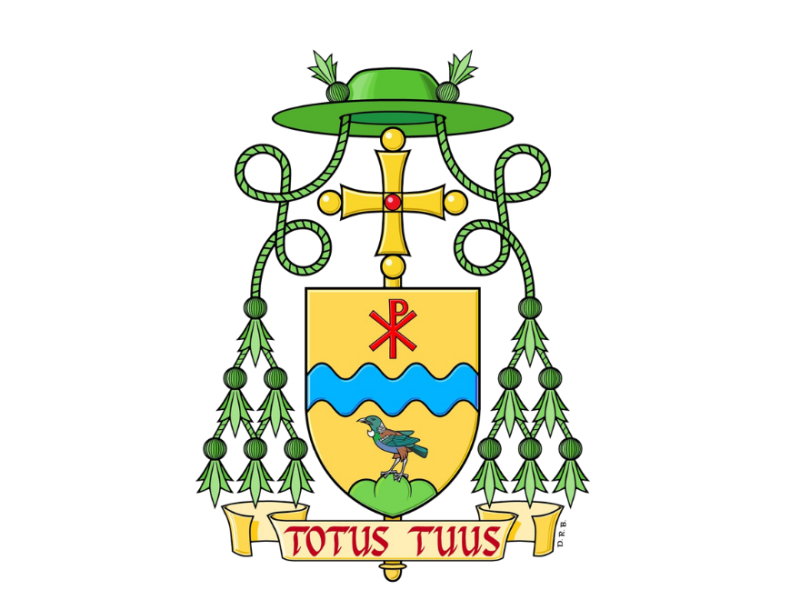
- Coat of arms

Location
- Country: New Zealand
- Territory: New Zealand
- Ecclesiastical province: Wellington

Statistics
- Area: 32,000 km^{2} (12,000 sq mi)
- Population: Total; Catholics: (as of 2022); 673,790; 68,750 (10.2%)
- Parishes: 18

Information
- Denomination: Catholic Church
- Sui iuris church: Latin Church
- Rite: Roman Rite
- Established: 10 May 1887
- Cathedral: St Mary's; Blessed Sacrament

Current leadership
- Pope: Leo XIV
- Bishop: Michael Gielen

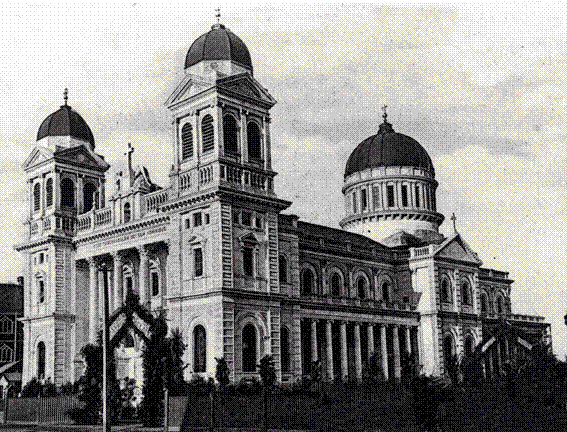
Cathedral of the Blessed Sacrament, Christchurch in the early 20th century.

The Diocese of Christchurch (Dioecesis Christopolitana) is a Latin Catholic suffragan diocese of the Archdiocese of Wellington. Its cathedral and see city are located in Christchurch, the largest city in the South Island of New Zealand. It was formed on 5 May 1887 from a portion of the territory of the Diocese of Wellington, which was elevated to archdiocese later that same month.

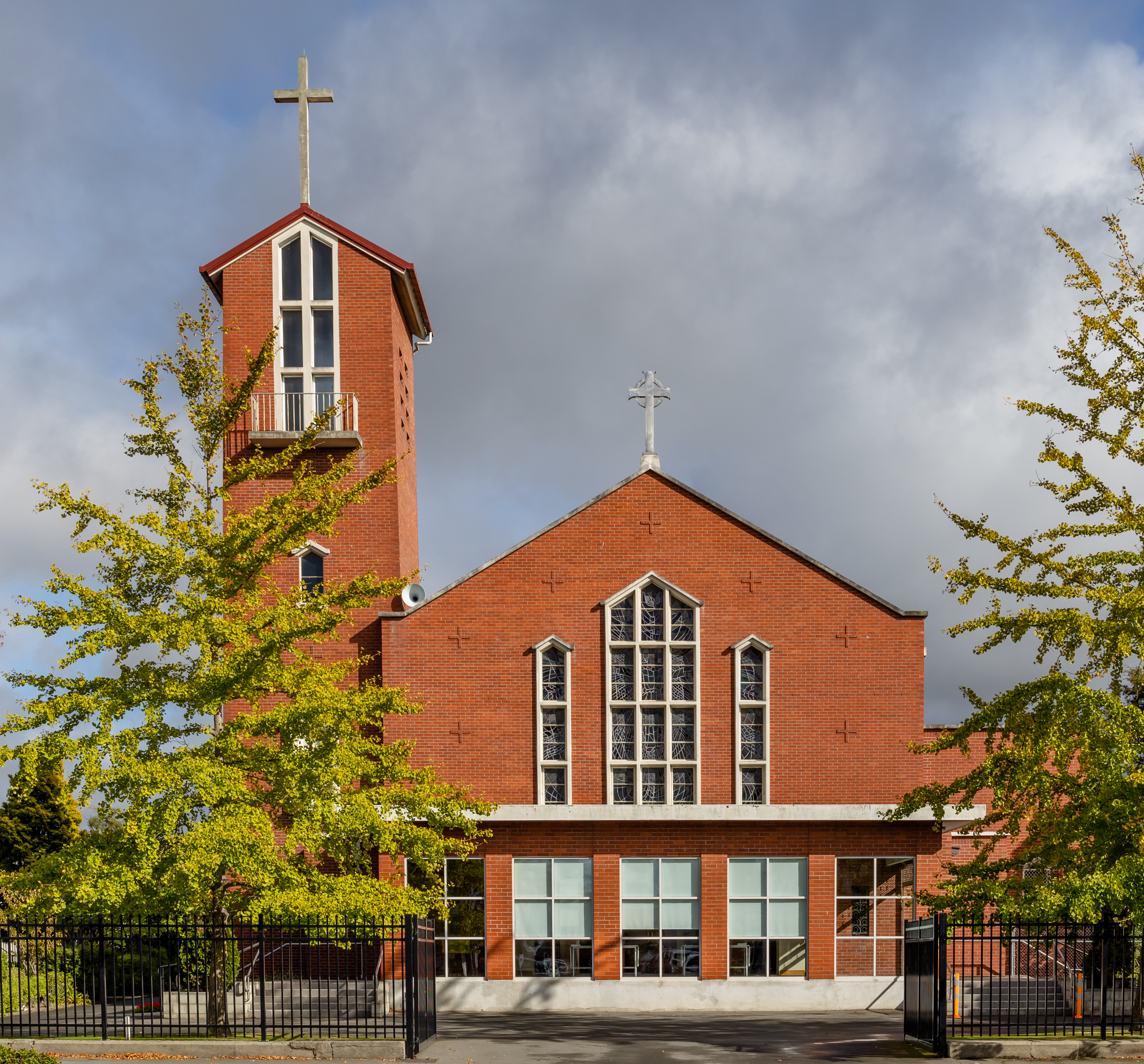
St Mary's Pro-Cathedral in 2019

== Bishops of Christchurch ==
Tenure	Incumbent	Life
1887–1915	John Grimes SM	1842–1915
1915–1943	Matthew Brodie	1871–1943
1944–1950	Patrick Lyons	1903–1967
1950–1964	Edward Joyce	1904–1964
1964–1985	Brian Ashby	1923–1988
1985–1987	Denis Hanrahan	1933–1987
1987–1995	Basil Meeking	1929–2020
1995–2007	John Cunneen	1932–2010
2007–2016	Barry Jones	1941–2016
2017–2021	Paul Martin SM	1967–
2022–present	Michael Gielen	1971–

Lyons was translated to become Auxiliary Bishop of Sydney, Australia in 1950. Martin was appointed Coadjutor Archbishop of Wellington, New Zealand in 2021.

== Current bishop ==
- Michael Gielen

== Bishops other than ordinaries ==
=== Coadjutor bishops ===
- Denis William Hanrahan (1984–1985)
- Barry Jones (2006–2007)

=== Auxiliary bishops ===
- John Cunneen (1992–1995), appointed Bishop here

=== Affiliated bishops ===
- Charles Drennan, appointed Coadjutor Bishop of Palmerston North in 2011; succeeded 2012; resigned 2019
- Stephen Lowe, appointed Bishop of Hamilton in New Zealand in 2014

== Cathedral and churches ==
=== Cathedrals ===
- Cathedral of the Blessed Sacrament (demolished)
- Christchurch Catholic Cathedral (in 2025, construction uncommenced)

=== Pro-cathedral ===
- St Mary's Pro-Cathedral

=== Churches ===
- Chapel of the Snows at McMurdo Station on Ross Island, Antarctica. For 57 years, the diocese was responsible for sending priests to the non-denominational Christian. This practice was stopped in 2015. It is the second southernmost religious building in the world.
- Sacred Heart Basilica, Timaru. Despite its name, it is not designated a basilica by the Catholic Church. The Basilica is also one of the "most noteworthy examples of ecclesiastical architecture" in New Zealand with elements of "Roman and Byzantine architecture with touches of Art Nouveau decoration." Designed by Francis Petre.
- St Joseph's Church, Darfield built in 1936, following a fire which gutted the previous wooden structure in 1934
- St Mary's Catholic Church, Hokitika. Following a structural assessment triggered by the February 2011 Christchurch earthquake, the church was closed to the public in June 2012.

== Secondary schools ==
- Catholic Cathedral College, Christchurch
- John Paul II High School, Greymouth
- Marian College, Christchurch
- Roncalli College, Timaru
- St Bede's College, Papanui, Christchurch
- St Thomas of Canterbury College, Sockburn, Christchurch
- Villa Maria College, Upper Riccarton, Christchurch

== See also ==
- Holy Cross Seminary
- Holy Name Seminary
- Father Bernard O'Brien SJ
- Roman Catholicism in New Zealand
- List of New Zealand Catholic bishops
