= Edward Joyce =

Roman Catholic bishop from New Zealand (1904–1964)

- 4th Bishop of Christchurch

Personal details
- Born: 26 June 1904 Lyttelton, New Zealand
- Died: 28 January 1964 (aged 59) Christchurch, New Zealand
- Education: Rangiora High School

Edward Michael Joyce (26 June 1904 – 28 January 1964) was the fourth Roman Catholic bishop of Christchurch, New Zealand. He was appointed by Pope Pius XII on 18 April 1950 and died in office on 28 January 1964. He was the first priest of the Christchurch diocese to be made a bishop.

== Early life ==
Joyce was born in Lyttelton, New Zealand in 1904 and spent part of his childhood in Loburn, where he attended Rangiora High School. He trained for the priesthood at Holy Cross College, Mosgiel.

== Priesthood ==
Joyce was ordained priest on 31 October 1930 in the Cathedral of the Blessed Sacrament, Christchurch by his uncle James Byrne, the 1st Catholic Bishop of Toowoomba. He then spent three years in Auckland. He was the chaplain at Sacred Heart College, then located in Ponsonby. Joyce returned to Christchurch in 1934 to be an assistant priest at Addington and then at Riccarton. In 1937 he was loaned to the Diocese of Toowoomba, where he assisted his uncle James Byrne until he died on 11 February 1938. In 1941 Joyce was appointed chaplain to the New Zealand Military Forces and served with New Zealand troops in Tonga and Fiji. In Fiji he was attached to the headquarters of the Fiji Infantry Brigade Group and was associated with many activities to promote the welfare of the troops in his area. After his demobilisation in 1945, Joyce was posted to the reserve of officers with the rank of Major He was stationed at the Cathedral in Christchurch and engaged in rehabilitation work for returned soldiers. He represented Bishop Lyons for three years on the Labour Department immigration committee. At the same time he was involved with general Catholic activities being spiritual adviser to the Catholic Women's League and the Catholic Men's Luncheon Club. Joyce was very involved during the Ballantyne's fire tragedy of 1947 and represented Bishop Lyons at the mass funeral for the victims. Joyce became parish priest at Sockburn in 1947.

== Episcopacy ==
Joyce was appointed Bishop of Christchurch on 18 April 1950 and was consecrated in the Cathedral on 16 July 1950 by Archbishop McKeefry and Bishops Liston and Kavanagh. Joyce's appointment was unusual among New Zealand bishops at that time in that he had no training in Rome or elsewhere overseas. During the 14 years of Joyce's episcopate the Christchurch diocese experienced considerable growth. The Catholic population increased from 31,769 to 48,500, the number of parishes increased from 32 to 47, the number of secular priests rose from 47 to 80, primary schools went from 35 to 53 and the number of pupils attending Catholic schools rose from 6524 to 11,038.

Bishop Joyce opened two new secondary schools, Cottesmore College (staffed by the Religious of the Sacred Heart) and St Thomas of Canterbury College (staffed by the Christian Brothers). Among the other religious orders introduced by Joyce were the Brothers of St John of God and the Daughters of Our Lady of Compassion. Joyce founded the Mary Potter Hospice for the Dying (operated by the Sisters of the Little Company of Mary), Rochester Hall (a hostel for Catholic university students) and he encouraged the setting up of an outpatients psychiatric clinic at Calvary Hospital. He attended the first two sessions of the Second Vatican Council.

In 1953, Joyce was awarded the Queen Elizabeth II Coronation Medal.

== Death ==
Joyce's final years were blighted by illness. which greatly reduced his effectiveness. He died on 28 January 1964, aged 59.

His requiem Mass was celebrated before a congregation of more than a thousand by Archbishop McKeefry who also preached the panagyric. Bishops Thomas William Muldoon, (Auxiliary Bishop of Sydney), Kavanagh of Dunedin, Reginald Delargey (Auxiliary Bishop of Auckland), and Owen Snedden (Auxiliary Bishop of Wellington) were also present.

He was interred in the Cathedral of the Blessed Sacrament, Christchurch at the foot of the altar of Saint Joseph.

Catholic Church titles
Preceded by Patrick Lyons	Bishop of Christchurch; 1950–1964	Succeeded by Brian Ashby
