= Rydges Hotel, Christchurch =

Building in Christchurch, New Zealand

Rydges Christchurch
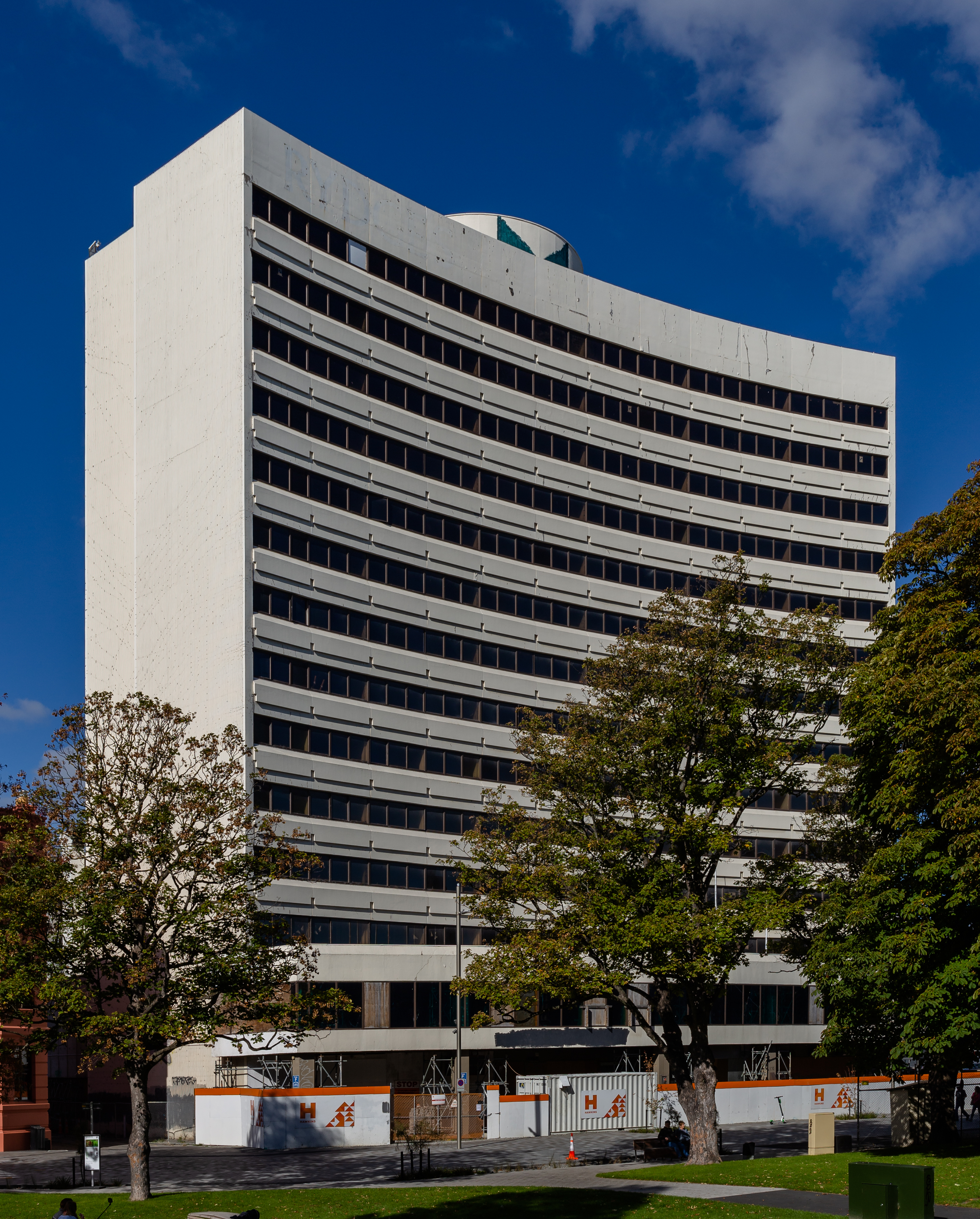
- The building in 2019
- Interactive map of the Rydges Christchurch area
- Former names: Noah's Hotel

General information
- Location: Christchurch Central City, Corner of Worcester Boulevard, Oxford Terrace and Cathedral Square
- Coordinates: 43°31′50″S 172°38′3″E
- Opened: 1975 (officially)

Technical details
- Floor count: 14 storeys

Rydges Hotel is a 14-storey-tall hotel building in Christchurch, New Zealand, that has been empty since the 2010 and 2011 Christchurch earthquakes. Located just off Cathedral Square, it officially opened in 1975 as Noah's Hotel. The building fell into neglect after the earthquakes and was the subject of an insurance dispute spanning 12 years. It is currently being repaired and renovated and is scheduled to reopen in mid 2027 as Sheraton Christchurch.

== Building ==
The building is located on the corner of Worcester Boulevard, Oxford Terrace and Cathedral Square, in the Christchurch Central City. It has a floor area of 4,879 square metres (52,520 sq ft) and is 14 storeys tall.

== History ==
Noah's Hotel was first used in 1974 to house athletes for the year's British Commonwealth Games. It officially opened as a hotel in 1975. In 1977, Queen Elizabeth II and Prince Philip stayed at the hotel, and in 1983, so did Prince Charles, later Charles III, and Princess Diana. In the 1990s, Noah's Hotel became Rydges.

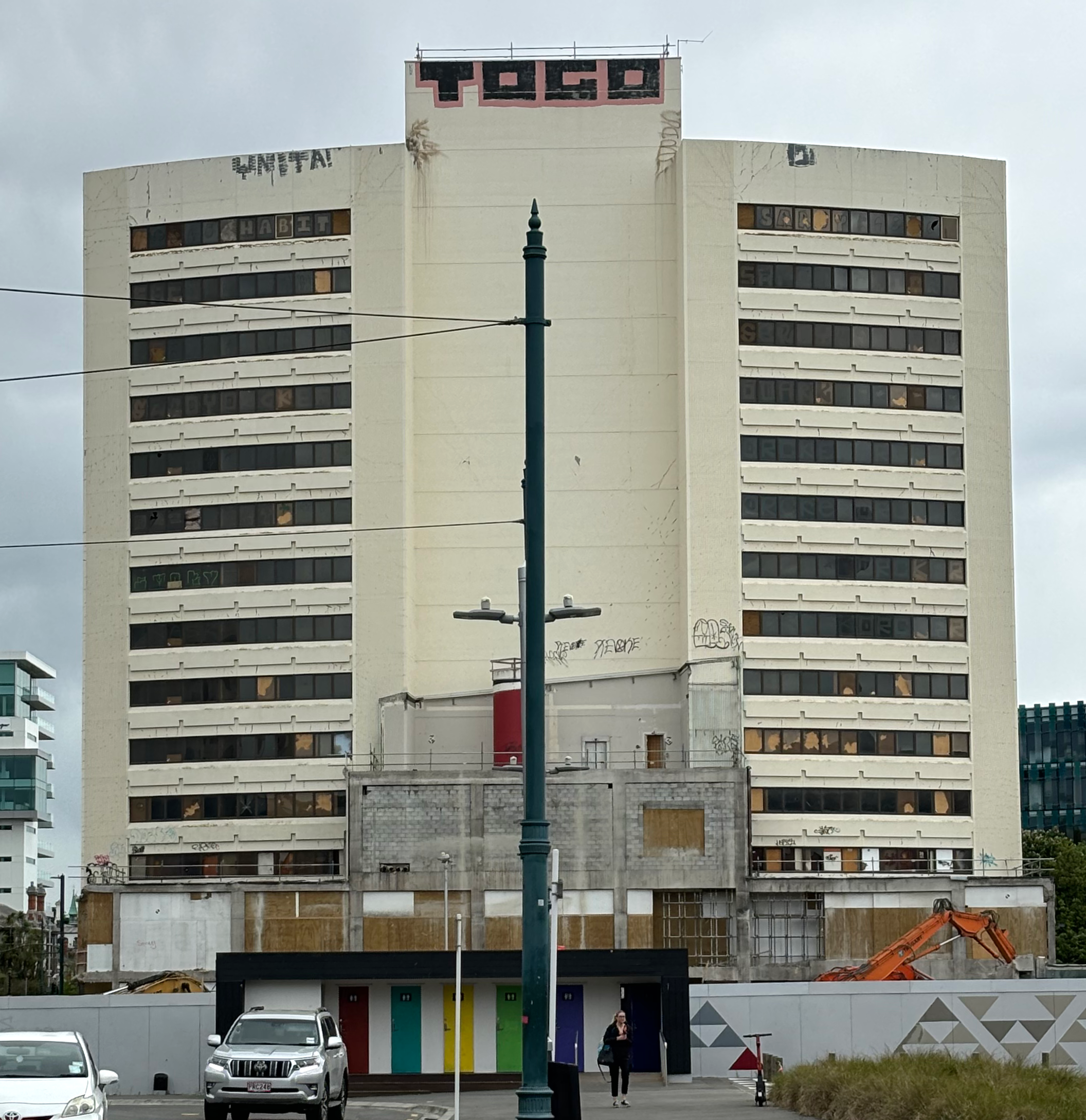
The back of the building in 2024

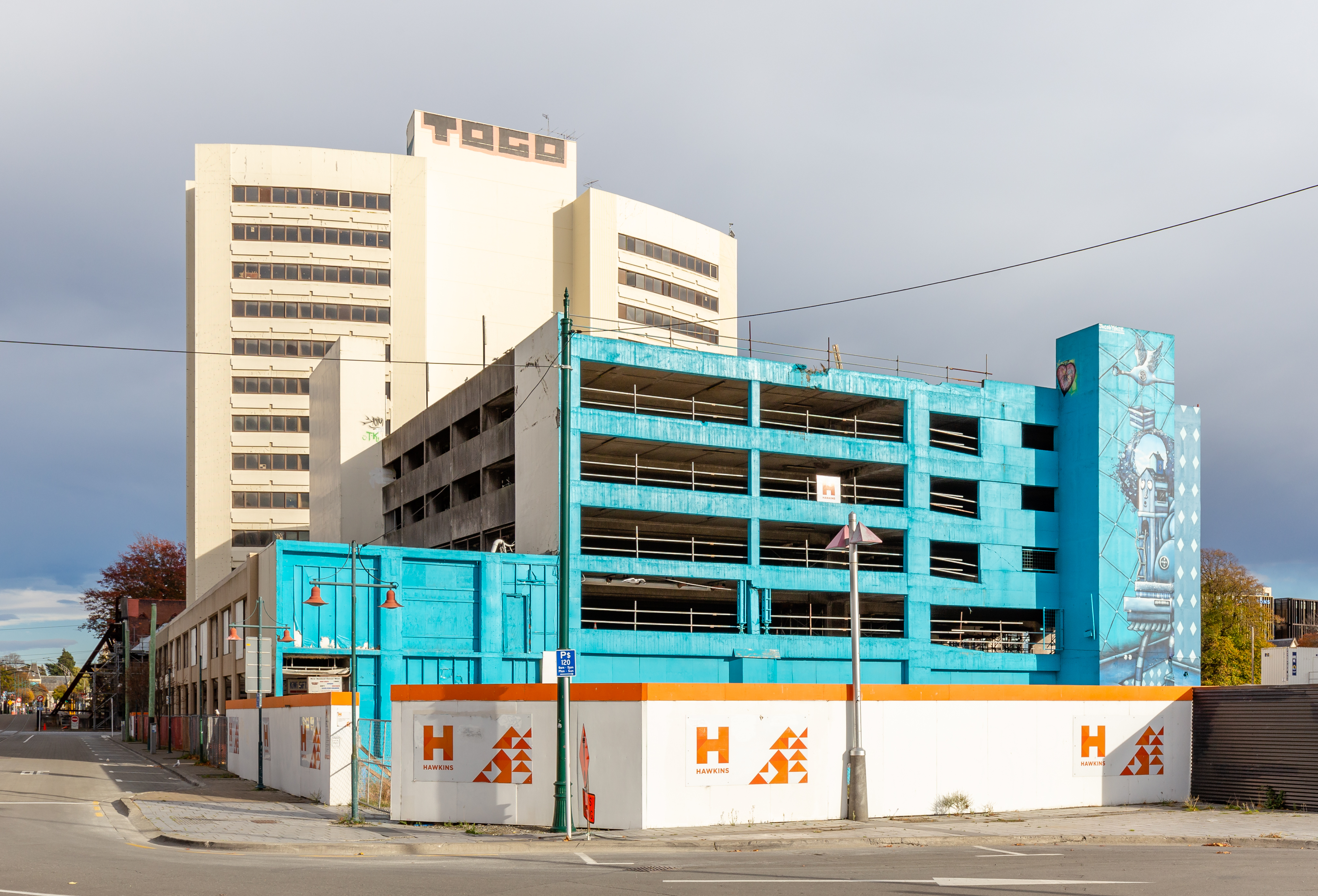
The car park behind the building in 2020. It was demolished in 2024.

After the 2010 and 2011 Christchurch earthquakes, the building became vacant and Rydges left the building to begin operating in Latimer Square. The former hotel fell into neglect and was vandalised by graffiti artists. One prominent tag was the text "TOGO" on the top of the building, which had also been placed on the Forsyth Barr Building.

Repairs began after the September 2010 Canterbury earthquake occurred. In June 2011, after the building was assessed by structural engineers, it was described by Stuff as "structurally sound but damaged internally". At that point in time the building was in the Central City Red Zone, near the border. Rydges New Zealand general manager of hotel development Chris Black stated at the time that "we would hope to have it open by mid next year". In 2017, the Christchurch City Council added the building into its 'Dirty 30' list: eyesores that had been vacant since the earthquakes and were an obstacle to the rebuild. The building attracted urban explorers.

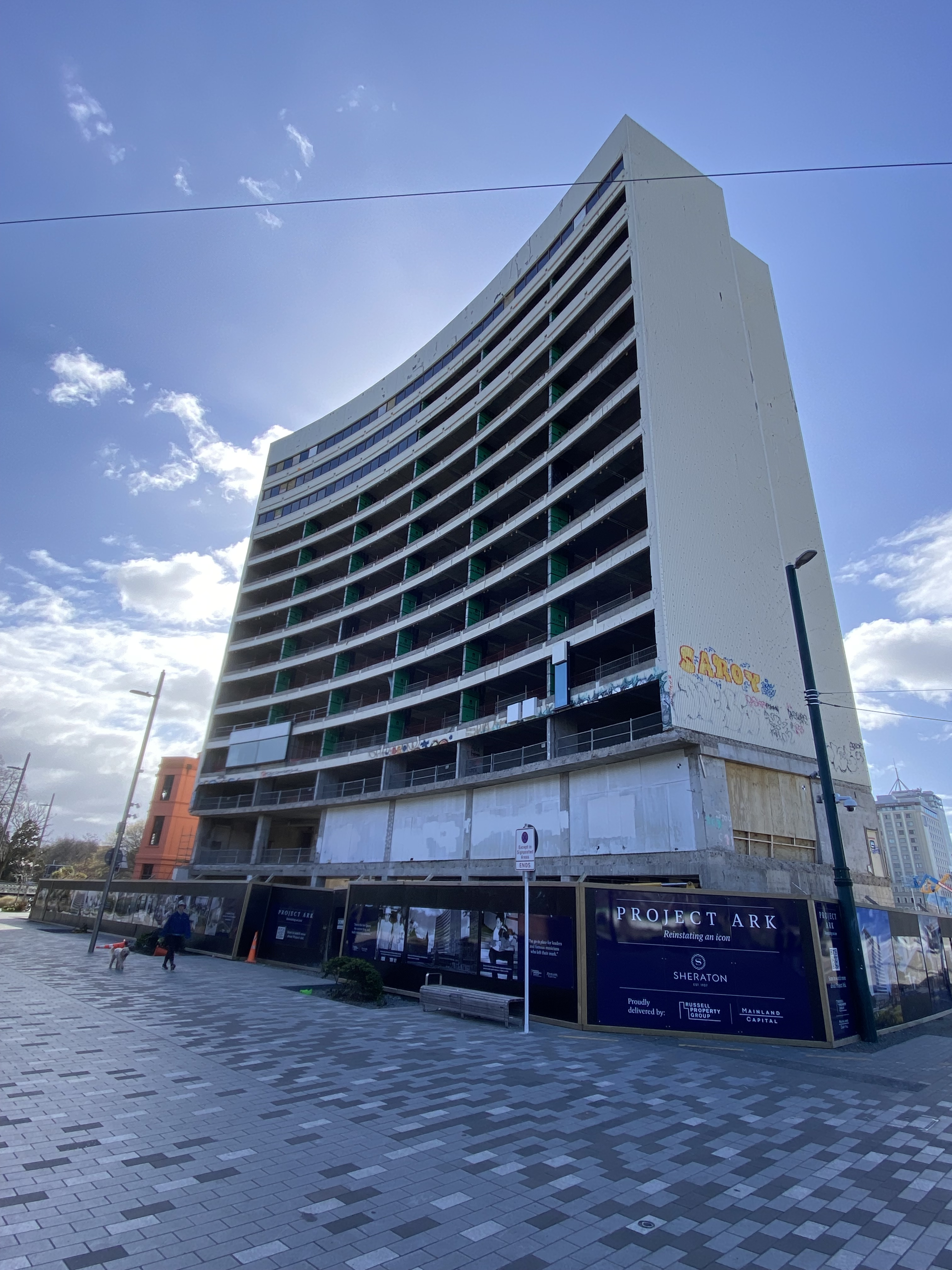
The building under repair in 2025, with sample panels installed

The building as well two other earthquake-damaged buildings were the subject of an insurance dispute spanning 12 years between the owners Emmons Developments and the insurers Vero and Mitsui Sumitomo. The dispute made its way up to the Supreme Court. The other buildings were the now-demolished car park behind it and the now-demolished Grand Thornton Building. A 2019 High Court decision resolved the dispute, allowing the owner to access up to $190 million in insurance cover to fund the restoration, rebuild and demolition of the three buildings. The dispute continued again in 2022 however, but it was settled out of court.

The building is being redeveloped by a joint venture between Russell Property Group (RPG) and Mainland Capital. When it opens, the hotel will have a new name: Sheraton Christchurch, part of the Sheraton brand owned by the American Marriott International. It will become the first Marriott hotel in the South Island. The restoration will include an extension on the eastern side of the building, an Avon River / Ōtākaro facing two-storey frontage and a canopy that will be above part of Worcester Street. As of August 2025, it is scheduled to open in mid-2027, at an estimated repair and renovation cost of $150 million.
