= Verleih uns Frieden (Mendelssohn) =

Chorale cantata by Felix Mendelssohn

- Chorale cantata by Felix Mendelssohn
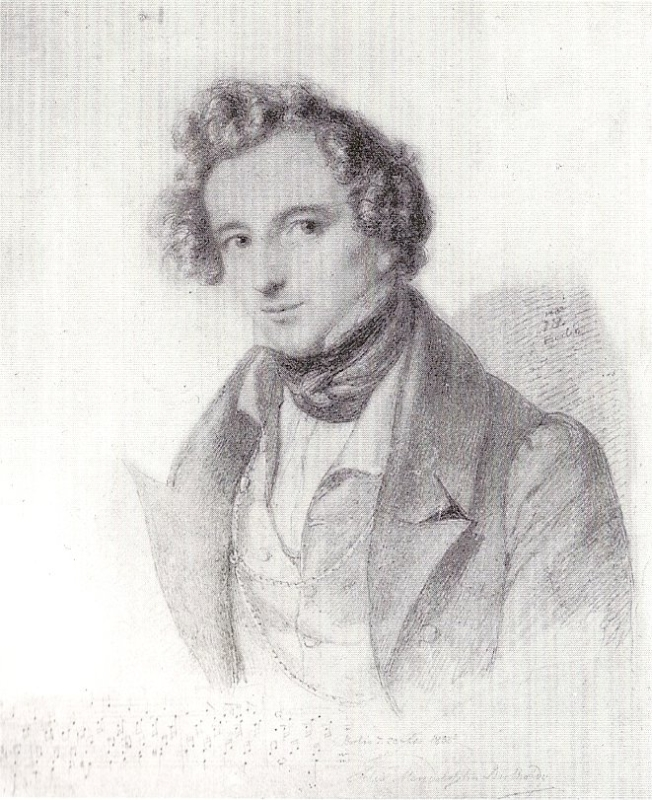
- Felix Mendelssohn, drawing by Eduard Bendemann, 1833
- Catalogue: WoO 5; MWV A 11
- Text: Da pacem Domine
- Language: German; Latin
- Composed: 1831
- Scoring: SATB choir; orchestra

Verleih uns Frieden (Grant us peace) by Felix Mendelssohn is a short, tripartite musical setting of a prayer for peace by Martin Luther. Mendelssohn composed the one-movement work for mixed choir and orchestra in 1831. It is also known as Verleih uns Frieden gnädiglich.

== History ==
The text is Martin Luther's "Verleih uns Frieden", a paraphrase of Da pacem Domine, a Latin prayer for peace from the 6th or 7th century based on biblical verses 2 Kings 20:19, 2 Chronicles 20:12,15 and Psalms 72:6–7. It was a regular close of church services in Luther's time.

Mendelssohn was exposed to Lutheran hymns during his studies with Carl Friedrich Zelter, and when he revived Bach's St Matthew Passion in 1829, which was at the time thought to be the centenary of its first performance. He composed Verleih uns Frieden in 1831 as one of eight chorale cantatas based on Lutheran hymns which he wrote as studies. He later chose only Verleih uns Frieden for publication.

The composition was published (edited by Julius Rietz) by Breitkopf & Härtel as part of Mendelssohn's complete works in 1875. Carus-Verlag published it in 1980, edited by Günter Graulich, including an organ version. It has the text in German and Latin, which Mendelssohn had added, "Dona nobis pacem, Domine", and an English translation "In thy mercy grant us peace".

== Music ==
Mendelssohn composed the melody for this setting and did not use the melody associated with Luther's text, which contrasts his later practice of using Luther's German Agnus Dei as a cantus firmus when he composed his first chorale cantata, Christe, du Lamm Gottes.

Mendelssohn originally planned to use "cellos and basses," but in the final version scored the work for four-part choir SATB and an orchestra of two flutes, two clarinets, two bassoons, two violins, viola, two cellos and double bass. It is in E-flat major and marked Andante. The melody appears three times, rendering the complete text each time. It is introduced by the basses alone, then repeated by the altos, with the basses singing counterpoint, and finally appears in the sopranos with a mostly homophonic four-part setting. The instruments provide independent moving material, with different scoring for the three entries.

Robert Schumann said about the composition: "The small piece deserves to be world famous and will become so in the future; the Madonnas of Raphael and Murillo cannot remain hidden for long."
