= Christchurch Catholic Cathedral =

New Christchurch Catholic Cathedral
- New Christchurch Catholic Cathedral
- 43.5383°S 172.6464°E
- Location: Christchurch Central City
- Country: New Zealand
- Denomination: Roman Catholic

History
- Status: Design released

Architecture
- Architectural type: Cathedral
- Style: Gothic and Romanesque

Specifications
- Capacity: 800

Administration
- Diocese: Christchurch

The Cathedral of the Blessed Sacrament is the planned successor of Christchurch's former Catholic cathedral (of the same name) which was damaged in the 2010 and 2011 Canterbury earthquakes and later demolished in 2020. This makes the cathedral the future mother church of the Roman Catholic Diocese of Christchurch (Dioecesis Christopolitana). Initially, the cathedral was to be located on the corner of Armagh and Colombo Streets, opposite Victoria Square. However, on 21 April 2024, Bishop Michael Gielen announced the cathedral would be returning to the Barbadoes Street site, formerly occupied by the Cathedral of the Blessed Sacrament. It will be the first Catholic cathedral to be built in New Zealand in 120 years.

== History ==
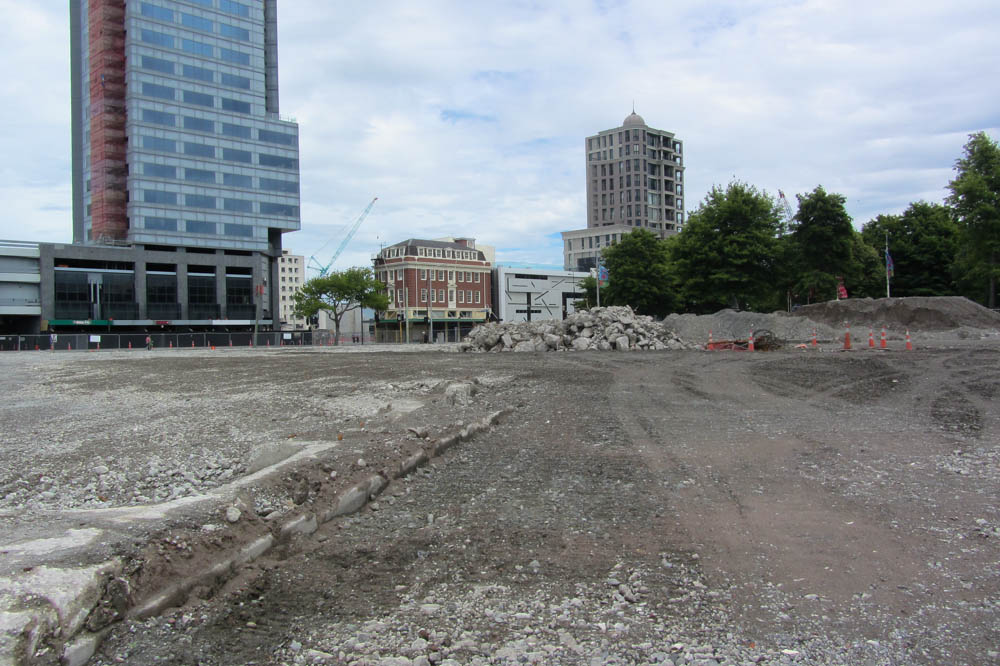
The initial site of the new cathedral. Picture taken just after the demolition of the Copthorne Hotel (December 2013)

On 4 August 2019, Bishop Martin announced that the Cathedral of the Blessed Sacrament was to be demolished. This decision was in contrast to Bishop Barry Jones, who favoured the restoration of the cathedral. Plans for the new cathedral, including a building collaboration called North of the Square with Ōtākaro Limited, and the Carter Group were announced by Bishop Martin on 7 December 2019. This collaboration, priced at NZ$500m, included new offices and a chancery, a five-star hotel, and a multi-storey carpark. It was planned to be completed by 2026.

=== Costs ===
The Catholic precinct was to cost NZ$100m, with NZ$40m being designated to the construction of the cathedral. The remaining funds were to be spent on chancery offices, an open courtyard, a garden, and parking. Of the NZ$500m collaboration, NZ$126m was set aside for the Diocese. Funding for the construction of the Cathedral was to be carried out, with NZ$45m already being used from its earthquake fund, as well as selling land no longer needed by the Diocese.

=== Legal issues ===
On 26 March 2023, congregations of the Christchurch Diocese were told that the Vatican's supreme court, the Supreme Tribunal of the Apostolic Signatura halted action on the building project, to hear a legal case from a group of 300 parishioners (collectively known as 'The Gathering') from around Christchurch who opposed the $100 million building plan. The parishioners are challenging the Diocese under Canon Law. The group are hoping that suburban churches can be retained and a replacement cathedral be built on the Barbadoes Street site, formally occupied by the now-demolished Cathedral of the Blessed Sacrament.

The Gathering also stated that Archbishop Martin (then Bishop of Christchurch) did not have the authority to demolish the Cathedral of the Blessed Sacrament in 2019 and the selling of property for funding of the planned Cathedral. The Gathering and the Diocese subsequently sent one of 15 globally-known Canon Law lawyers to the hearings in the Vatican.

== Construction ==
=== Design ===
Two architect companies that are to design the new cathedral are local architect firm, Warren and Mahoney Architects, based in Christchurch and Franck & Lohsen Architects from the United States. Franck & Lohsen are known to focus on designing traditional design and have built churches all over the World. Bishop Martin stated saying why this firm was chosen:

"I am looking for us to build something that is more traditional rather than something modern. It needs to tap into why people loved the [cathedral]. People loved the [cathedral] because of the style and elegance."

On 26 July 2026, the design and renders of the future cathedral were released.

=== Location ===
Despite the land being purchased for the initial site, it was announced on 21 April 2024 that the cathedral will instead be built on the original site of the cathedral before the earthquakes. The purchased land will be sold off.

=== Naming ===
On 26 May 2024, Bishop Gielen had his pastoral letter read out to parishes around the Diocese on the new pastoral name of the future cathedral. A choice of three patronal names were chosen by Bishop Gielen, namely: St Francis of Assisi, St John the Baptist, and The Blessed Sacrament. On 4 August 2024, Bishop Michael announced the new cathedral's name will be that of its predecessor: The Blessed Sacrament.
