= St Joseph's Church, Mt Victoria =

Coordinates: 41.30077°S 174.78275°E

St Joseph's Church, Mt Victoria, Wellington
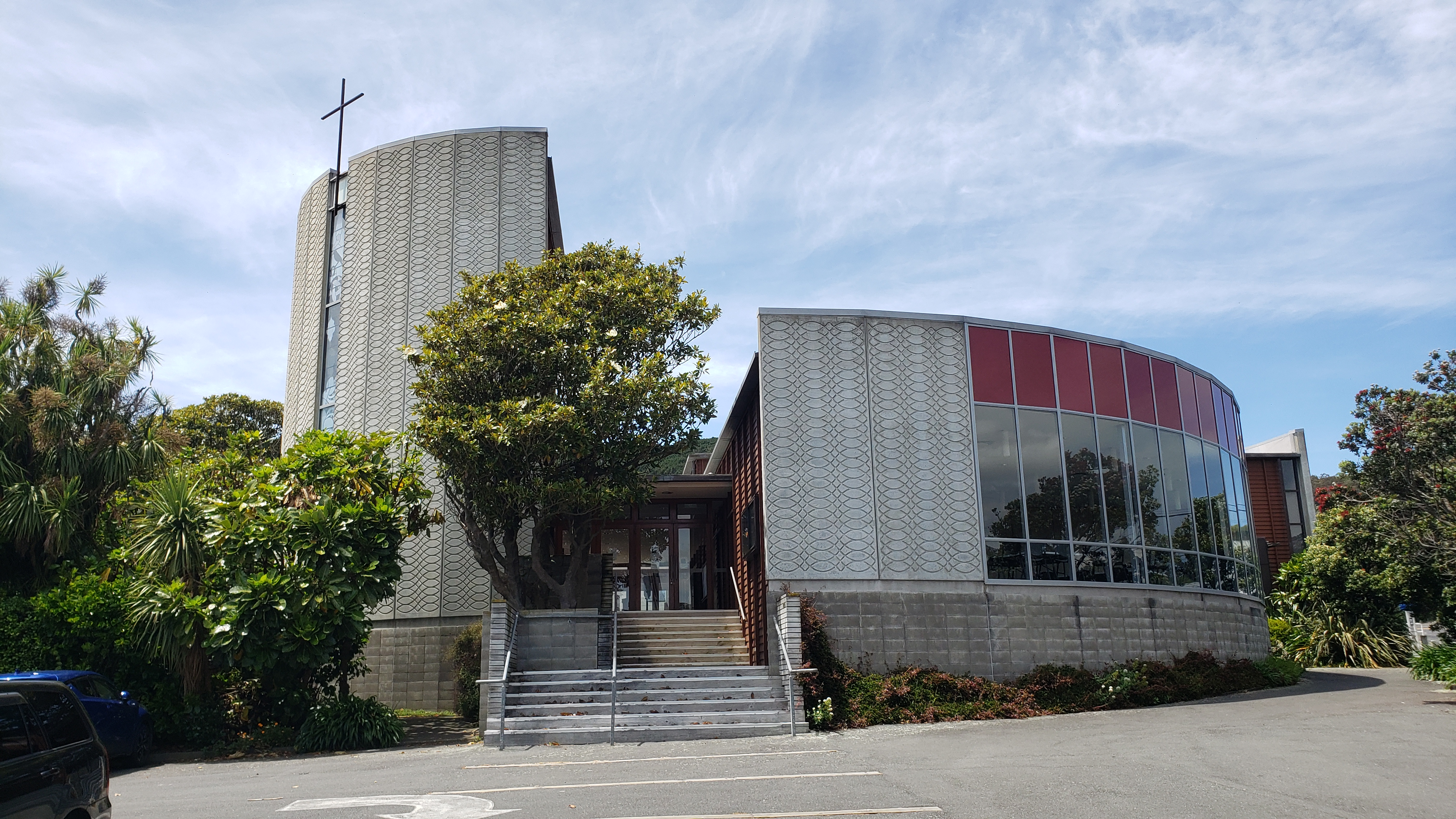
- The church, from its west entrance
- St Joseph's Church, Mt Victoria, Wellington
- Location: 42 Ellice St, Mount Victoria, Wellington
- Country: New Zealand
- Denomination: Catholic

History
- Founded: 1885
- Dedicated: 2004

Architecture
- Architect: Studio Pacific

Administration
- Diocese: Roman Catholic Archdiocese of Wellington
- Parish: Mt Victoria

Clergy
- Bishop: Cardinal John Dew

St. Joseph's Church is a modern Catholic church opened in 2004 located in the central city suburb of Mt Victoria, Wellington, New Zealand, on the eastern side of the Basin Reserve.

== History ==
The Catholic presence in Mt Victoria dates from 1885 when a octagonal, wooden, church was built in Buckle St, west of the Basin Reserve, next to St Patrick's College (founded in that year). Later the crèche and incurables hospital founded by Mother Aubert were built adjacent to and east of the church.

In 1898, nearby land was set aside on the corner of Tory St and Buckle St as the site for a new cathedral for Wellington following the destruction by fire of St Mary's Cathedral. The building of this cathedral was continually delayed and this affected the subsequent building history of the parish as the cathedral would also have served as the parish church. In 1945 the octagonal Buckle St church, which at times was used for functions appropriate to a pro-cathedral, was demolished because of its decrepit state, and the parish shifted to the east of the Basin reserve, into a renovated hall, beside the parish school staffed by the Sisters of Mercy, in Paterson Street, near the residence of Archbishop O'Shea. This is more or less the site of the present church.

Sacred Heart Basilica, Hill Street, Thorndon, was dedicated as the cathedral for Wellington in 1984 after the proposed Tory St/Buckle St cathedral site had been acquired by the Crown (state) for motorway construction. The octagonal church and the unbuilt cathedral sites are now largely included in the Pukeahu National War Memorial Park, which includes the transported and preserved Mother Aubert crèche, with State Highway one running through the Arras Tunnel underneath.

The present St Joseph's Church was opened, to great rejoicing, in 2004, replacing the converted hall which had served as the church of the parish for sixty years and after the final definition of the alignment of Paterson St, which is part of State Highway 1 continuing to the Mount Victoria Tunnel and the eastern suburbs and Wellington Airport beyond.

== Architecture ==
The building was designed by Studio Pacific Architecture, a Wellington architecture firm. It is constructed of concrete and timber. The liturgical area is a large semi-amphitheatre design in a circular-triangular formation seating 300 with the altar at the flattened apse. There is a full-immersion baptistery and a separate Blessed Sacrament chapel seating about 30 surmounted by a tower with an ascending stained glass window (the "Bahaut window" - see below) by the artist Shane Cotton, especially visible from Cambridge and Kent Terraces and the Basin Reserve to the west and south. There is also a large separate area for the parish community to gather for meetings and social activities.

== Stained glass ==
The church possesses particularly fine examples of Art Deco stained glass from the studio of Harry Clarke of Dublin. These were imported as part of the New Zealand Catholic Church pavilion at the 1939/1940 New Zealand Centennial Exhibition held in Lyall Bay, Wellington. This followed closely on the centennial of the Catholic Church in New Zealand in 1938, leading events of which were held in or near the octagonal St Joseph's Church. These fine works which include the glass crucifix, the glass image of Our Lady on the Plinth (with infant) and the glass rose window of the Virgin Mary are greatly treasured and the rose image of the Virgin serves as her shrine in the liturgy space of the church.

The Bahaut window by Shane Cotton was the gift of parishioners Anthony and Nanette Bahaut and was made in the workshop of Glassworks Studios in Auckland. The images in the window (including fish, taniwha, fantail, open bible, large pot (symbolising the faith), the fleur de lys of France (for Mother Aubert and the Marists) and the alpha and omega, (for Jesus Christ) represent the progress of the pilgrim journey of the faith in New Zealand.

The church also has English Victorian stained glass windows from the studio of the Atkinson Brothers which were in the original octagonal church of St Joseph, notably the window of St Joseph in the Blessed Sacrament chapel. Five other windows in the same series were given by St Joseph's parish to Sacred Heart Cathedral on its becoming the cathedral in 1984.

== Statuary ==
The large crucifix behind the altar was first installed in the original octagonal St Joseph's Church in Buckle St. The cross from which the figure of Christ hangs was made from heart Kauri and was "blessed with all the mission indulgences in 1894." The full size statue of the Sacred Heart stood above the altar of the octagonal St Joseph's and was donated by a convert to the Catholic faith in "thanksgiving to God for the grace of the faith."

== See also ==
- Roman Catholic Archdiocese of Wellington
- Sacred Heart Cathedral, Wellington
- St Gerard's Church and Monastery
- St Mary of the Angels, Wellington
- Catholic Church in New Zealand
- St Patrick's College, Kilbirnie, Wellington
