= Sacred Heart Cathedral School, Thorndon =

Sacred Heart Cathedral School

Location
- 12 Guildford Terrace, Thorndon, Wellington, New Zealand; 41°16′36″S 174°46′34″E

Information
- Type: State Integrated; Full Primary (Year 0-8)
- Established: 1850; 176 years ago
- Ministry of Education Institution no.: 2985
- Enrolment: 232 (July 2026)
- Socio-economic decile: 9

Sacred Heart Cathedral School is a New Zealand, Catholic, primary school located in the central-city suburb of Thorndon, Wellington, New Zealand. It is part of a Catholic precinct dating from 1850. It joins St Mary's College, Wellington and Sacred Heart Cathedral, Wellington and is located opposite the Motherhouse of the Sisters of Mercy in Wellington.

== History ==
Philippe Viard, first Catholic Bishop of Wellington, blessed and opened a convent and school on 1 September 1850. From 1850 until 1861 it was staffed by the Sisters of Mary, a group of religious sisters under the direction of Bishop Viard. These four sisters had arrived with the bishop from Auckland on the establishment of the Diocese. They were: Catherin McCann (Sister M Cecelia); Mary Anne McGarvey (Sister M Joseph); Elizabeth Walsh (Sister M Teresa); and 14-year-old Sarah McGarvey (Mary Anne's sister). The building served as a temporary school by day and the sisters residence at night. This establishment was the beginning of the present day St Mary's College as well as Sacred Heart Cathedral School. From 1861, when they first arrived in Wellington, the Sisters of Mercy took over the school and were on its staff until the late twentieth century when the staff became entirely lay.

== Buildings ==
The existing main building of the school was completed in 1892 and was designed to accommodate 300 children. When St Mary's Cathedral was burnt down in 1898, that school building (St Mary's Chapel) also served as the Thorndon parish church until the new Sacred Heart Basilica was completed in 1901. Later the playing area of the school expanded into the former site of Bishop Viard's residence ("Viard House") towards the Basilica, which was officially made the Wellington Cathedral in 1984. The ample size of the wooden school building enabled its later redevelopment in 1975 by building new classrooms inside the existing roof. Other substantial buildings were added in the first decade of the twenty-first century.

== The school today ==
The school became an integrated school in 1983. Its character has also changed from being a purely local school with the pupils coming from the local parish to a central-city school with the vast majority of its pupils coming from parishes other than Sacred Heart parish, Thorndon.

== Choir school ==
Sacred Heart Cathedral normally has a boys' choir made up of about 15 boys from the Sacred Heart Cathedral School. Each boy received a scholarship which paid for weekly individual vocal tuition and theory lessons. The boys sang at the Cathedral during school term time. The boys' choir and the cathedral choir both went into abeyance in March 2021 when the post of Sacred Heart Cathedral Director of Music was abolished. The situation will be reviewed when the restoration of the Cathedral is completed and all the parish masses are resumed there.

== See also ==
- Sacred Heart Cathedral, Wellington
- St Mary's Cathedral, Wellington
- St Mary's College, Wellington
- Sisters of Mercy

== Sources ==
- Sister M de Porres RSM, Mercy Comes to Wellington: A History of St Mary's College, Sisters of Mercy, Wellington, 2000.
- Dan Kelly, On Golder's Hill: A History of Thorndon Parish, Daniel Kelly and the Parish of the Metropolitan Cathedral of the Sacred Heart and of Saint Mary His Mother, Wellington, 2001.
- Michael O'Meeghan SM, Steadfast in hope: The Story of the Catholic Archdiocese of Wellington 1850-2000, Dunmore Press for the Catholic Archdiocese of Wellington, 2003.
- NZSSAA
