= St Mary's College, Wellington =

All-girls Catholic secondary school in New Zealand

St Mary's College
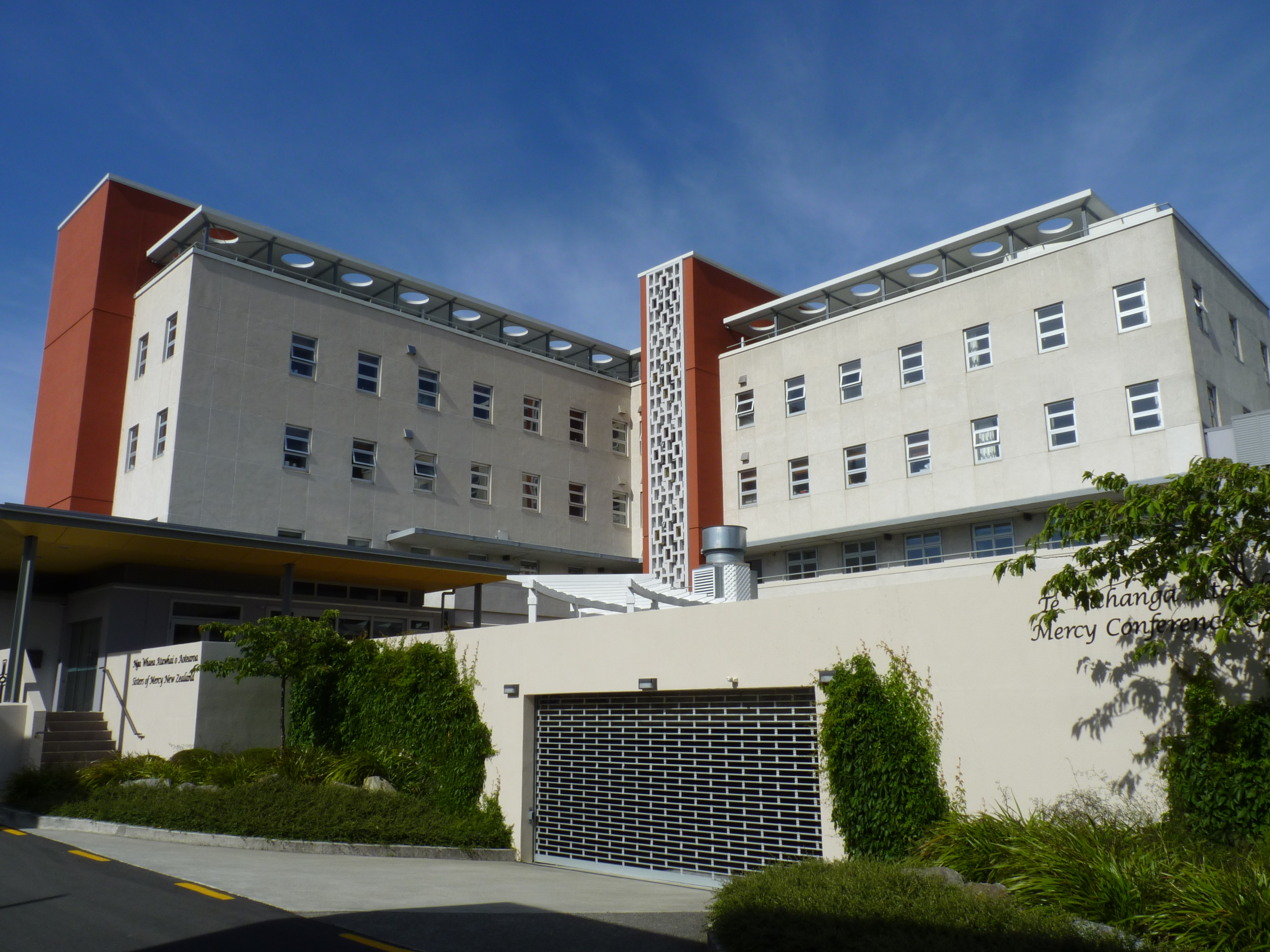
- Exterior of the Mercy Convent neighbouring St Mary's College

Location
- Guildford Terrace, Wellington, New Zealand; 41.2756°S 174.7758°E

Information
- Type: Integrated secondary (year 9–13) single sex, girls
- Motto: Misericordia et Sapientia (Mercy and Wisdom)
- Established: 1850; 176 years ago
- Ministry of Education Institution no.: 286
- Principal: Sarah Parkinson
- Enrolment: 558 (July 2026)
- Socio-economic decile: 9Q
- Website: www.stmw.school.nz

St Mary's College Wellington is situated in the suburb of Thorndon in Wellington, New Zealand. The school is a state-integrated all-girls Catholic secondary school for years 9–13.

== History ==
The school, which is one of the oldest existing schools in New Zealand, was founded in 1850 by Philippe Viard, first Bishop of Wellington and staffed from 1861 by a small group of religious sisters, the "Sisters of Mary", established by Viard. Part of the land on which the school is situated was donated by Lord Petre, the 11th Baron Petre (1793–1850), who was a director of the New Zealand Company and whose family seat Thorndon Hall in Essex was an important centre of Catholic Recusancy from the time of Queen Elizabeth I. The area of Central Wellington in which the school is located is also named after Thorndon. Another part of the site was given by Sir George Grey, Governor of New Zealand out of public funds. In 1861 the school was taken over by the Sisters of Mercy (absorbing the earlier group) when they arrived in Wellington in that year. To begin with, the school was co-educational (boys and girls) and had a boarding facility attached. Nowadays the boarding facility is gone, and it is a single sex day girls' school.

== Enrolment ==
As a state-integrated school, the proprietors of St Mary's College charge compulsory attendance dues to cover capital costs. For the 2025 school year, the attendance dues payable is $1,147 per year per student.

As of July 2026, St Mary's College has a roll of 558 students, of which 125 (22.4%) identify as Māori.

As of 2026, the school has an Equity Index of 429, placing it amongst schools whose students have few socioeconomic barriers to achievement (roughly equivalent to deciles 8 and 9 under the former socio-economic decile system).

== Buildings ==
While most traces of the original buildings on the site have disappeared, buildings dating from the twentieth century as the latest, including the "Gabriel Block" which is now used as the school hall. The other two main blocks are "Carlow" and "McAuley". McAuley is named after Sister Catherine McAuley, who used her inherited fortune to found the Sisters of Mercy in Dublin, Ireland.

The school remains in the ownership of the Sisters of Mercy and describes itself as a "Mercy School". The Gabriel Hall and St Joseph's Providence Porch have Category 2 listings with Heritage New Zealand (formerly New Zealand Historic Places Trust).

As most other New Zealand Schools do, students in years 11–13 sit NCEA (National Certificate of Educational Achievement) examinations.

== Characteristics ==
- Number of Teachers: 33
- International Students: 4
- Ethnic make up of students: New Zealand European/Pākehā, 45%; Pacific, 22%; Māori, 16%; Asian, 14%; Other, 3%

== See also ==
- Sacred Heart Cathedral School, Thorndon
- Sacred Heart Cathedral, Wellington
- St Catherine's College, Wellington
- Sisters of Mercy
- St Mary's Cathedral, Wellington
- St Patrick's College, Silverstream

== Notable alumnae ==
- Margaret Butler (1883–1947) – sculptor.
- Oroya Day MBE (née McAuley, 1931 – 2014) - art historian, academic, and community activist
- Pip Desmond – Author and journalist.
- Maddie Feaunati (born 2002) - international rugby union player; has played for England and for Exeter Chiefs in the Premiership Women's Rugby.
- Patricia Grace DCNZM QSO (born 1937) – writer.
- Ainsleyana Puleiata (born 2000) – international netball player.
- Katherine Skipper - architect.
- Saviour Tui (born 2001) – Netball player; has represented Samoa internationally.
- Beverley Wakem DNZM CBE (born 1944) – Former Chief Ombudsman, president of the International Ombudsman Institute and chief executive of Radio New Zealand.
- Therese Walsh DNZM (born 1971) – chief executive and business leader; chief operating officer for the 2011 Rugby World Cup and head of the organising body for the 2015 Cricket World Cup.
- Joy Watson (née Evans) (1938–2021) – author of children's books.
- Fran Wilde DNZM QSO (born 1948) – New Zealand politician, and former Wellington Labour member of parliament, Minister of Tourism and first female Mayor of Wellington.

== References/Sources ==
- Lillian G. Keys, Philip Viard, Bishop of Wellington, Pegasus Press, Christchurch, 1968.
- Ernest Richard Simmons, Brief history of the Catholic Church in New Zealand, Catholic Publications Centre, Auckland, 1978.
- Michael King, God's farthest outpost : a history of Catholics in New Zealand, Viking, Auckland 1997.
- Mary de Porres Flannigan R.S.M., Mercy comes to Wellington : a history of St. Mary’s College, St. Mary’s College Board of Trustees, Wellington, 2000.
- Michael O'Meeghan S.M., Steadfast in hope : the story of the Catholic Archdiocese of Wellington 1850–2000, Dunmore press, Palmerston North, 2003.
