= St Mary of the Angels, Wellington =

Coordinates: 41°17′19.57″S 174°46′25.93″E

St Mary of the Angels
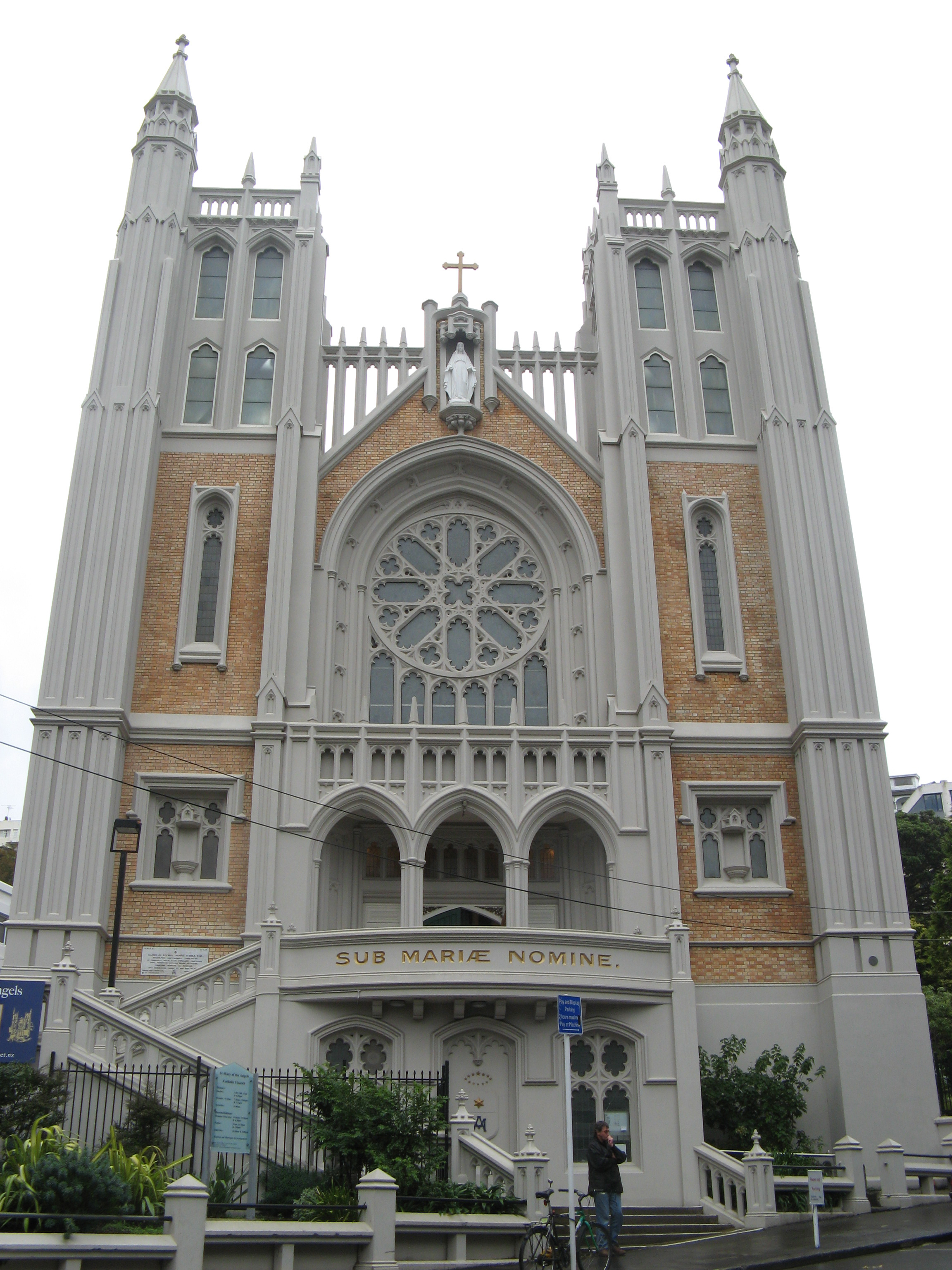
- St Mary of the Angels
- Location: 27 Boulcott Street, Wellington
- Country: New Zealand
- Denomination: Catholic
- Website: St Mary of the Angels

History
- Founded: 1843; 183 years ago
- Consecrated: 26 March 1922

Architecture
- Architect: Frederick de Jersey Clere
- Style: Neo-Gothic
- Years built: 1922; 104 years ago

Administration
- Diocese: Roman Catholic Archdiocese of Wellington
- Parish: Wellington Central

Clergy
- Priests: Kevin Mowbray; Michael Young

Heritage New Zealand – Category 1
- Designated: 8 September 1984
- Reference no.: 36

St Mary of the Angels is a Catholic church on the corner of Boulcott Street and O'Reily Avenue in Wellington, New Zealand. It is the parish church for Wellington Central and one of the major churches of the city. The Marist Fathers have provided clergy for St Mary of the Angels since 1874 in succession to its founding and long-serving parish priest, the Capuchin Franciscan, Father Jeremiah O'Reily. The church was used by Archbishop O'Shea as his pro-cathedral (1936–1954). It was the site of the funeral of Suzanne Aubert in 1926 and is well known for its church music tradition.

== History ==
The first Catholic church built on the site of St Mary of the Angels was a small chapel ("the chapel of the Nativity") built by Father O'Riley in 1843. It was blessed and dedicated by Bishop Pompallier on a visit to Wellington in the next year. This building was gradually enlarged and was completely replaced by a large wooden church in 1874. Fr O'Riley named this building "St Mary of the Angels" after the Portincula chapel which was precious to St Francis of Assisi. This church was extended until it was badly damaged by fire in 1918 and then demolished. Lost in the fire were records of the Mount Street Cemetery, the original Catholic cemetery in Wellington City. The earliest known burial was in 1851, and the cemetery was closed by Order-in-Council in 1891 (except for pre-purchased family plots).

The present building was opened and blessed on 26 March 1922 by Francis Redwood and a solemn pontifical Mass was celebrated by James Michael Liston. A sermon was preached in the evening by Bishop Whyte of Dunedin.

== Architecture and features ==
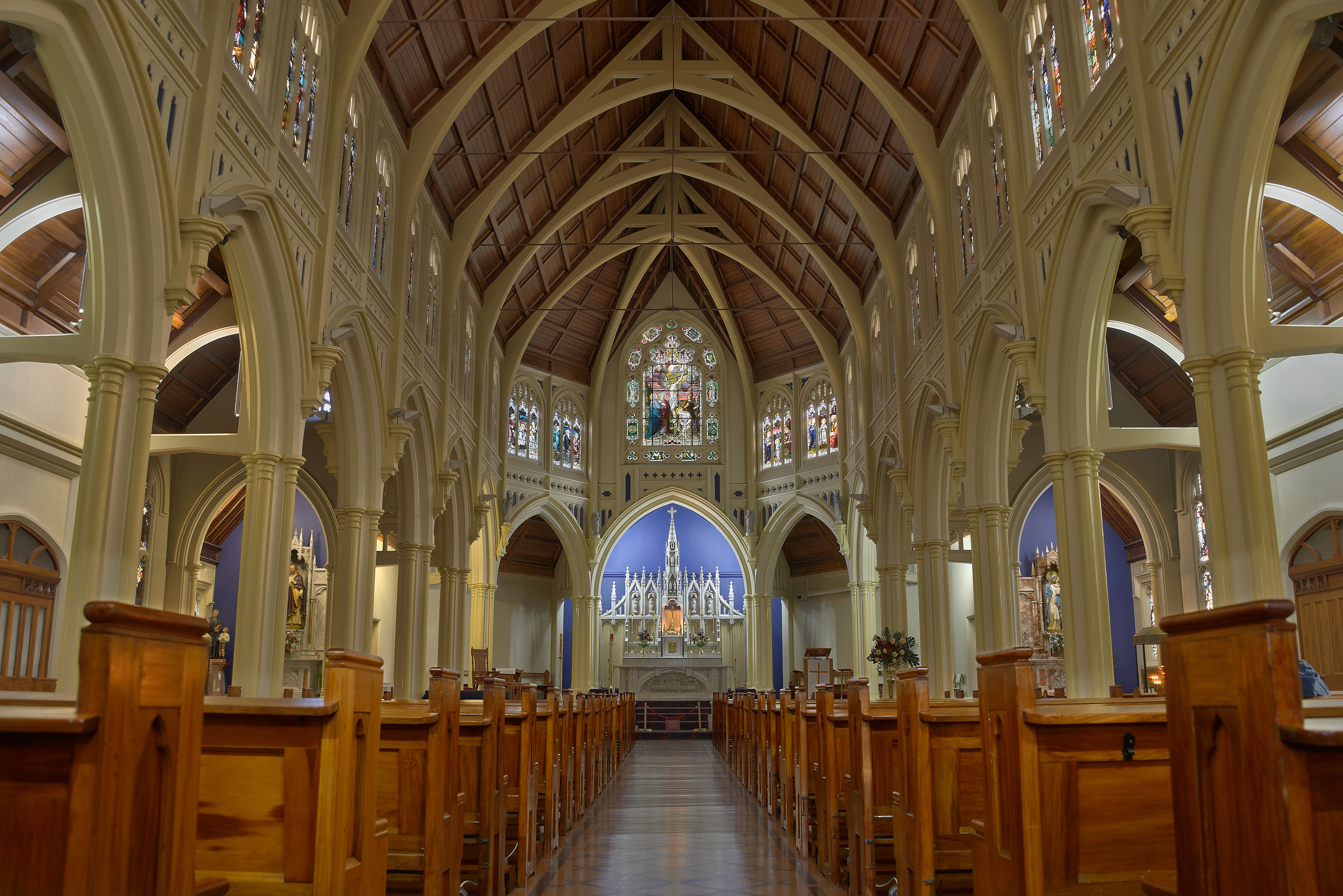
St Mary of the Angel's interior (2012); before 2017 structural strengthening; the windows of the clerestory, the marble high altar, reredos and side altars are prominent.

The building is classified as a Category 1 Historic Place (places of "special or outstanding historical or cultural heritage significance or value") by Heritage New Zealand, being opened in 1922 with uninterrupted church use of the Boulcott Street site from 1843.

Plans for the church were prepared by architect Frederick de Jersey Clere in 1919. Architecturally, the design is traditional Gothic of French influence. The front facade was said to have been modelled on that of the Cathedral of St. Michael and St. Gudula in Brussels. The structure is reinforced concrete and brick with a timber roof supported by concrete arches with steel tie rods. Its construction was innovative in that it was 'the first occasion ferro-concrete was used for a church of Gothic design'.

The church is noted for its collection of stained glass windows, especially in a continuous series completely around the clerestory interrupted by the rose window above the narthex, a window of the crucifixion above the high altar and two spacious banks of 15 windows, one finishing the north transept (fifteen decades of the Rosary) and one finishing the south transept (the life of Saint Joseph). These windows flood the liturgical spaces of the church with light.

The church also houses an extensive collection of statuary, including a reduced, marble, copy of Michelangelo's Moses (located in the church grounds) and life-sized representations of the Pietà and the Holy Family. In the transepts, the Our lady and St Joseph side altars are of brown-mottled marble and include prominent statues of Our Lady of the Rosary (in Dominican habit with blue veil) and Saint Joseph, with votive candle racks in front of each of them. Other large statues in various parts of the church include the Sacred Heart, St Vincent de Paul, St Marcellin Champagnat and St Peter Chanel.

The Gothic marble high altar and tabernacle, in front of a blue backing, includes a sculpted, reredos with statues. The altar was detached from the reredos and moved forward in the 1960s in the implementation of the liturgical reforms of the Second Vatican Council (the celebration of the Mass facing the congregation). This altar is fronted by a carved, Last Supper set under an incised arch along its width. The ornate columns in the sanctuary are topped by marble statues of angels.

== Suzanne Aubert ==
The church is particularly revered as the site of the funeral of Mother Aubert whose cause for canonisation as a saint is proceeding. The funeral was held on 4 October 1926. It was the largest funeral held for a woman in New Zealand. The church was packed for the solemn pontifical requiem mass, celebrated by Archbishop Redwood and other clergy, and vast crowds gathered along the funeral route to the church and from the church to Karori Cemetery to see the passing of the cortege of the 91 year old. One passerby asked "What religion was this woman?". A workman leaning on his shovel by the roadside answered: "That is a question she would never have asked you or me!".

== Music ==
St Mary of the Angels is renowned for its Gregorian Chant which began in 1905. With the opening of the present church in 1922, a choir of 70 voices sang Mass under the direction of Edward Healy. This was continued and strengthened by Maxwell Fernie for 40 years from 1958 until his death in 1999 and continued under his successor and former student, Robert Oliver. The organ of the church is a unique instrument, originally built in 1958 by George Croft and Son Limited from Auckland, but extensively redesigned in 1984 to Max Fernie's specifications.

== Strengthening ==
The church was closed following the July 2013 Seddon earthquake and the August 2013 Lake Grassmere earthquake sequence for structural strengthening. The church had been assessed as being between 15% and 20% of the standard a new building would be built to. In New Zealand, buildings assessed as below 33% of standard are considered "earthquake prone" and strengthening is required or a compulsory demolition can be ordered. The church re-opened in April 2017 after earthquake strengthening to 100% of code, costing $9.5 million, collected in a well-supported public fund-raising campaign. The look of the interior was largely unchanged except for the shear walls built in two locations on each side of the church near the entrance, and beside the sanctuary. All the ornate columns supporting the roof, the foundations and the copper and slate roof were replaced. Certain clerestory stained glass windows were obstructed from view on the outside of the church by the new shear walls but inside were unchanged, with the images illuminated as through the other windows, by means of artificial lighting. The effect of the seismic strengthening was generally perceived to be a restoration rather than a reconstruction, although the latter was the true situation. The project was undertaken by Clendon Burns & Park as the engineer and LT McGuinness as the construction company and was awarded a heritage restoration award in the 2018 New Zealand Heritage Project Awards.

== See also ==
- Roman Catholic Archdiocese of Wellington
- Society of Mary (Marists)
- Sacred Heart Cathedral, Wellington
- St Gerard's Church and Monastery
- St Joseph's Church, Mt Victoria
- Roman Catholicism in New Zealand
- St Patrick's College, Kilbirnie, Wellington
