= List of Catholic dioceses in New Zealand =

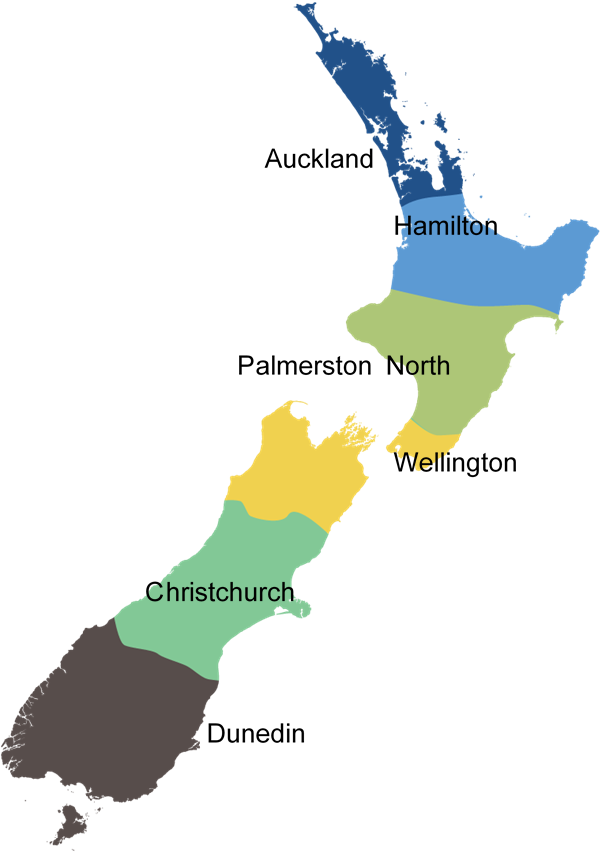
Map of Roman Catholic dioceses in New Zealand

The Catholic Church in New Zealand is composed of one ecclesiastical province with 5 suffragan dioceses (as of 2023).

== Episcopal Conference of New Zealand ==
The New Zealand Catholic Bishops' Conference is the national body of the bishops of New Zealand.

=== Ecclesiastical Province of Wellington ===
- Archdiocese of Wellington
  - Diocese of Auckland
  - Diocese of Christchurch
  - Diocese of Dunedin
  - Diocese of Hamilton in New Zealand
  - Diocese of Palmerston North
