= St Gerard's Church and Monastery =

Historic building in Wellington, New Zealand

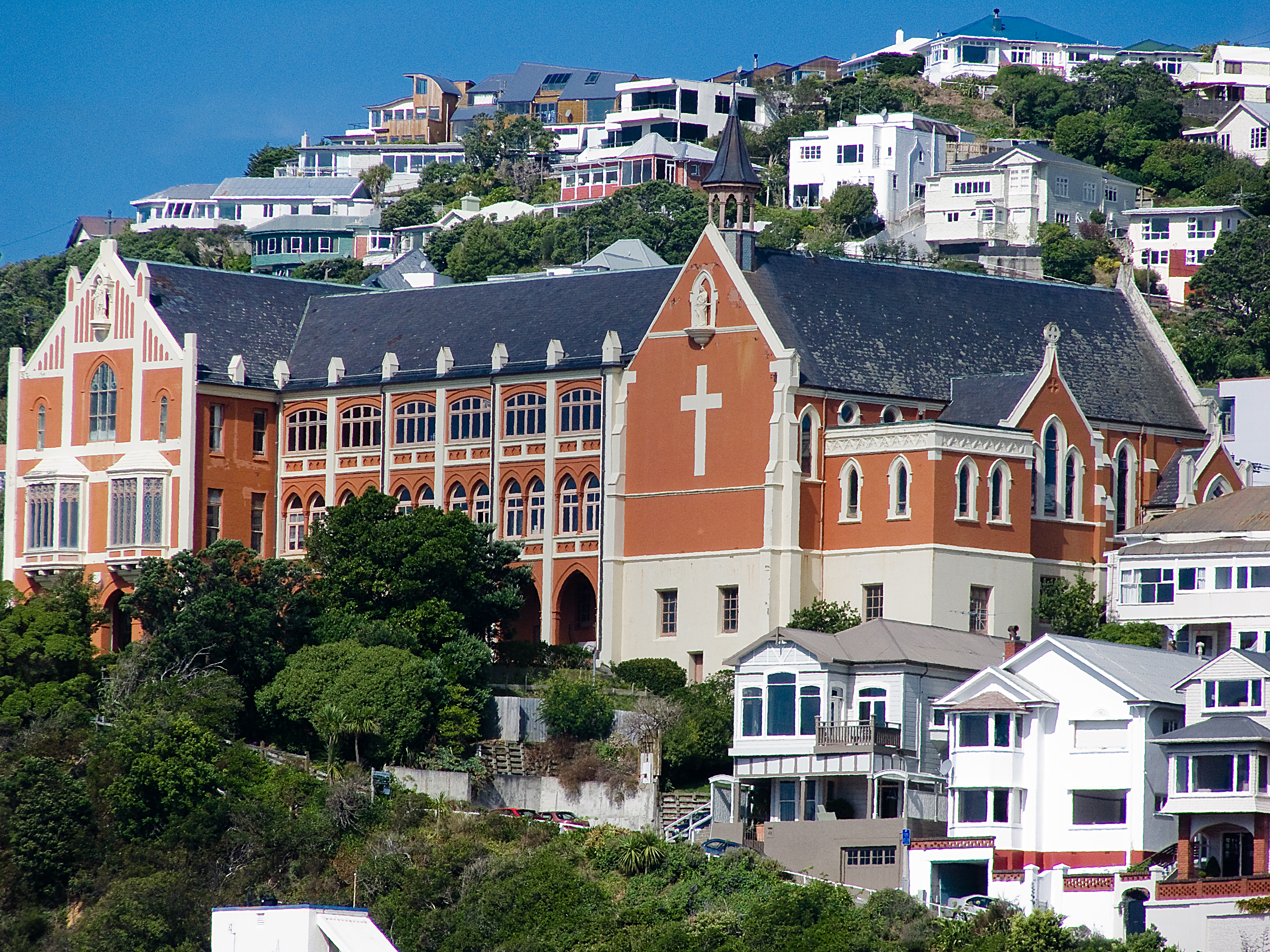
- St Gerard's Church and Monastery in 2008
- Interactive map of the St Gerard's Church and Monastery area

General information
- Architectural style: Gothic revival
- Location: 73–75 Hawker Street, Mount Victoria, Wellington, New Zealand
- Coordinates: 41.291962°S 174.790784°E
- Construction started: Church: 1908; Monastery: 1931

Design and construction
- Architects: Church: John Sydney Swan; Monastery: Frederick de Jersey Clere

Heritage New Zealand – Category 1
- Designated: 5 April 1984
- Reference no.: 226 and 227

St Gerard's Church and Monastery collectively form one of Wellington's most distinctive and iconic landmarks. Located on Mount Victoria in Wellington, both buildings are classified as Category 1 Historic Places (places of "special or outstanding historical or cultural heritage significance or value") by the New Zealand Historic Places Trust. They are built on the site of a sixteen-roomed house (called Fitzgerald's Folly) and property owned by James Edward Fitzgerald who some claim to be New Zealand's first Prime Minister. In April 2021, the owners of the buildings, the Institute for World Evangelisation - ICPE Mission, announced that the church would close at the end of the following month due to safety concerns. The buildings were sold on 27 March 2023. The purchaser was a recently formed company, St Gerard's Limited.

== The Church ==
The church was built in 1908, to the design of John Swan, for the Congregation of the Most Holy Redeemer, known as Redemptorists, a religious institute of priests and brothers. The church was the first in the world to be dedicated to the Italian member of their order and saint, Gerard Majella, after his canonisation. It is constructed to a simple gothic design built of brick, accommodating about 200 people. The church is noted for its assemblage of fine stained glass windows produced by Hardman and Son of Birmingham, "rated by the company the best they had ever exported." Swan designed the fine marble altar made of green Devonshire marble with supporting columns of green Galway marble, and throne and white steps of white Carrara marble. A panel of Italian mosaics depicting the Annunciation adorns the altar front.

== St Gerard ==
As the first church in the world dedicated to Gerard Majella, the church was the location for an oil painting of St Gerard in Ecstasy which was given by Pope Pius X to the Wellington church in recognition of that status. The work was painted in Rome by Giovanni Gagliardi for the saint's beatification in 1893. In 1904, for the canonisation, the painting was carried through Rome in procession and hung in St Peter's.

== The Monastery ==
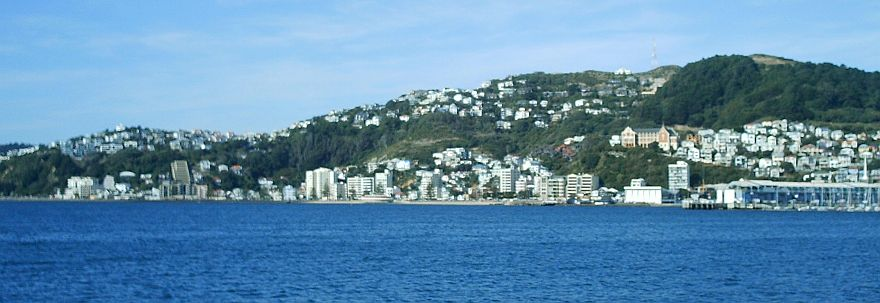
Oriental Bay as seen from the city at Queens Wharf. St Gerard's is prominent on its hill just right of centre.

Completed in 1932, funded by public donations, the three storied Monastery was constructed as a home for the Redemptorists. The foundation stone was laid by Archbishop Redwood and it was blessed and opened on 10 April 1932 by Archbishop O'Shea (who was coadjutor bishop at that time). Frederick de Jersey Clere is usually regarded as the architect for the monastery in succession to, or in collaboration with his architectural practice partner, John Swan. The structure is of reinforced concrete with brick in-fill panels, Gothic windows and red-brick arches for the cloisters which are situated to benefit from the northern sun.

The prominent and dominant position of the monastery has been preserved by the Wellington City Council acquiring property between the monastery and the cliff over Oriental Bay to prevent the buildings being obscured from view from almost any vantage point around Wellington Harbour.

== The Redemptorists ==
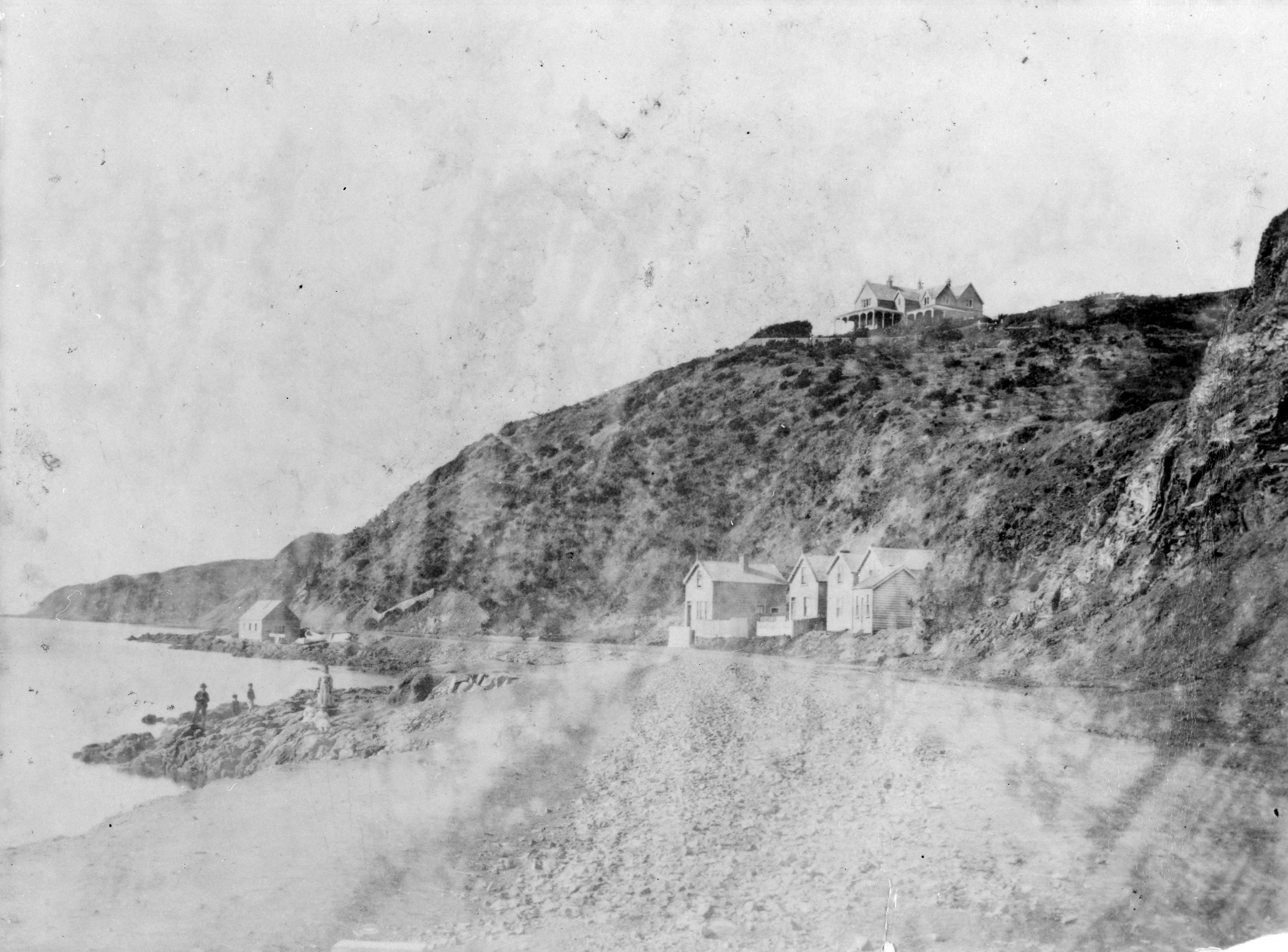
Oriental Bay showing Fitzgerald's house, the Redemptorists' first home, on the site of St Gerard's Monastery

The Redemptorists first arrived in Wellington in 1882 and were based in the Fitzgerald house from 1908 until its replacement by the monastery building in 1932. For 56 years from 1932 to 1988, St Gerard's Monastery was the centre of their mission in New Zealand. This consisted of the preaching of parish retreats and missions all around the country and they presented devotional activities at St Gerard's itself such as frequent and regular novenas, rosary and other devotions. The Redemptorists also had the Holy Family Confraternity for men and the Confraternity of Our Lady of Perpetual Succour for women. "A well-patronised service was an undertaking always to have a priest available for anonymous confession or spiritual consultation at the press of a special doorbell." The monastery had an outstanding choir which was heard on radio in a series of services beginning in October 1927. Gradually the sermon took precedence over the music and this attracted more listeners, many of them non-Catholics.

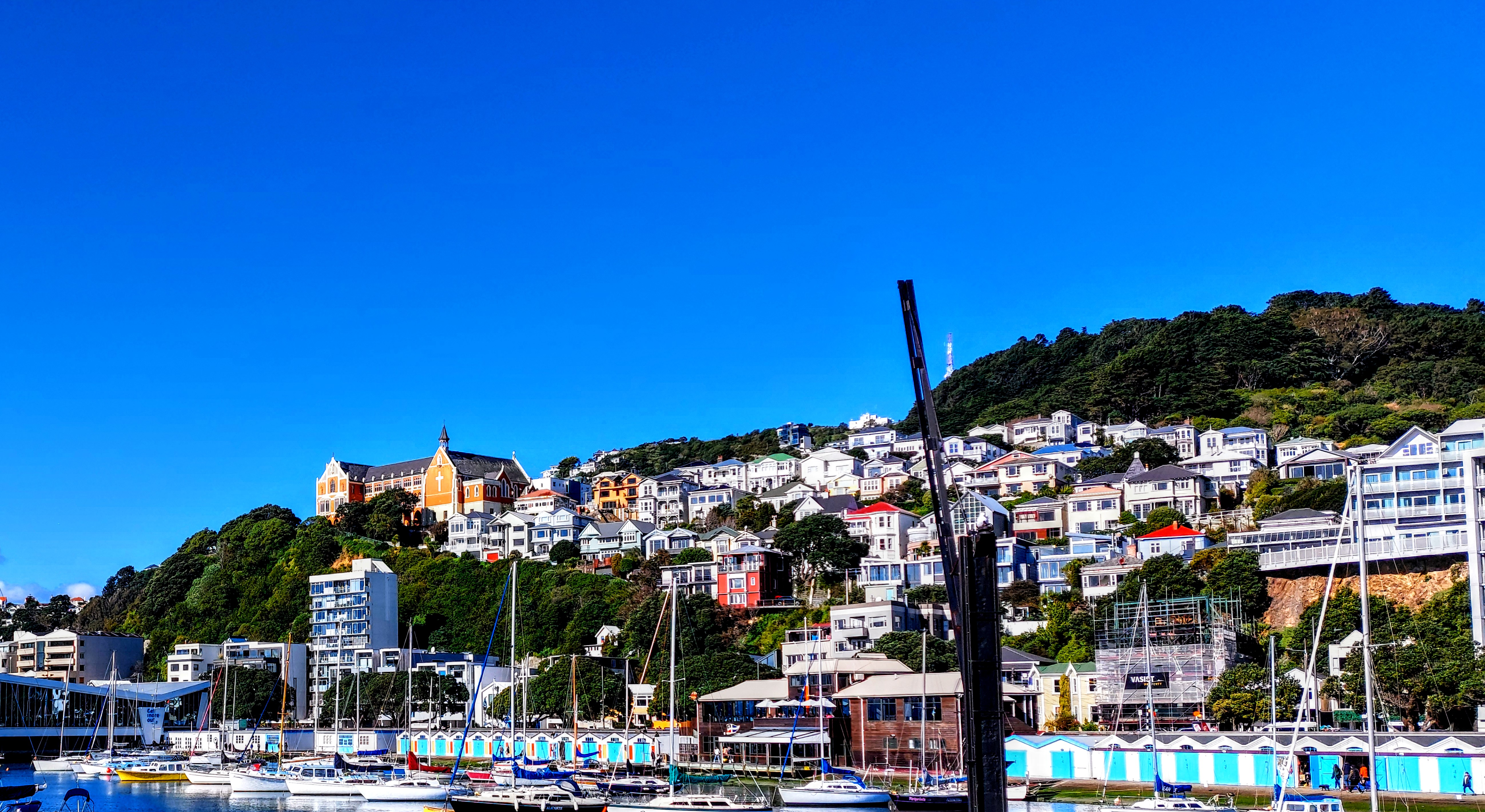
St Gerard's Monastery is a significant feature on the hillside, as shown in this picture taken from the waterfront

In 1988, after an 80-year occupation, because of the costs associated with the buildings and their own declining numbers, the Redemptorists decided to sell the buildings and remove the St Gerard painting.

== Institute for World Evangelisation ==
The complex was acquired in 1992 by the Institute for World Evangelisation - ICPE Mission (International Catholic Programme of Evangelisation) a Catholic association of the faithful - for use as a retreat and training centre for Catholic evangelist missionaries, to be operated by a resident community. The church's public worship role continued with a Mass celebrated by the institute's priests every Sunday at 10.30am. The community was founded in Malta in 1985, and gained Pontifical Right in 2002. St Gerard's was used by the group as "a base to spread the Gospel through its charisms of worship and evangelisation". Eighteen "Schools of Mission" were held, with groups of young people from many countries engaging in a five-month, fully residential faith formation programme that ended with a month of "missionary outreach". The ICPE missionaries also conducted missions in parishes throughout New Zealand. They presented programmes in schools and also engaged in social service activities such as serving the homeless in Wellington by working in the Compassion soup kitchen. They worked with prisoners and also work with youth groups and local prayer groups.

In 2020 and 2021 ICPE was unable to run its missionary school due to restrictions on international travel following the COVID-19 pandemic. At the same time, ICPE was struggling to secure sufficient funds to strengthen the earthquake-prone buildings. The church had to be closed and the last public Mass (113 years after the opening of the church) was celebrated on 23 May 2021. After 30 years of occupation, the ICPE Mission decided to sell the buildings when they struggled to raise the $11 to $13 million needed to pay for strengthening. The complex was sold on 27 March 2023.

Pending its departure from St Gerard's, the Institute for World Evangelisation-ICPE Mission entered a "period of discernment to re-think its long-term presence in Wellington". About 20 community members had, over the years, settled in Wellington. These members decided to continue the ICPE presence by becoming a "Community of Companions" and to live out their charism of worship and evangelisation through their participation in parish ministries and preserving their community ethos by "meeting monthly in each other's homes".

The ICPE donated the Altar from the main church to the Metropolitan Cathedral of the Sacred Heart. The Catholic Archbishop of Wellington Paul Martin SM said he was excited that such "a cherished part of St Gerard’s history and of the Catholic history of Wellington" would be preserved in the cathedral. A large statue of the Sacred Heart of Jesus was also given to the cathedral. The ICPE community also donated items such as furniture to community organisations "which could make good use of them, including, Kahungungu Whānau Services, St Vincent de Paul, Catholic Social Services and the Salvation Army".

== St Gerard's Limited ==
The complex was acquired on 27 March 2023 for just under $NZ5 million by St Gerard's Limited, with its shares held by a professional trustee company from Mahony Horner Lawyers. The director of the St Gerard's Limited was Sean David Kelly. The latest estimated cost of earthquake strengthening work had been stated by the previous owner to be $NZ20 million.

== See also ==
- Redemptorists of Australia and New Zealand
- Roman Catholic Archdiocese of Wellington
- Sacred Heart Cathedral, Wellington
- St Joseph's Church, Mt Victoria
- St Mary of the Angels, Wellington
- Catholic Church in New Zealand
