= Katherine Skipper =

New Zealand architect

- Born: Katherine Margaret Green
- Education: Victoria University of Wellington
- Occupation: Architect

Katherine Margaret Skipper (née Green) is a New Zealand architect.

== Biography ==
Skipper was educated at St Mary's College, Wellington, from 1985 to 1989. She initially studied law and physics at university before transferring to a degree in building science, which she completed at Victoria University of Wellington in 1996. She then continued study, graduating with a Bachelor of Architecture degree from Victoria in 2000.

Skipper worked part-time as a technician for architecture firm Warren and Mahoney while completing her degree and continued to work at the firm after graduating, until leaving to set up her own practice, Katherine Skipper Designer. In 2012, she returned to Warren and Mahoney, where she was appointed a principal architect in 2015. Skipper was project architect for the extension of the Wellington International Airport Terminal from 2012 until its completion in 2016. In 2018, she was appointed lead for Warren and Mahoney's Wellington studio.

Skipper was Wellington branch chair of the New Zealand Institute of Architects from 2016 to 2019.
