= Sacred Heart Cathedral, Wellington =

Church in Wellington Central City, New Zealand

Sacred Heart Cathedral
- Metropolitan Cathedral of the Sacred Heart and St Mary his Mother
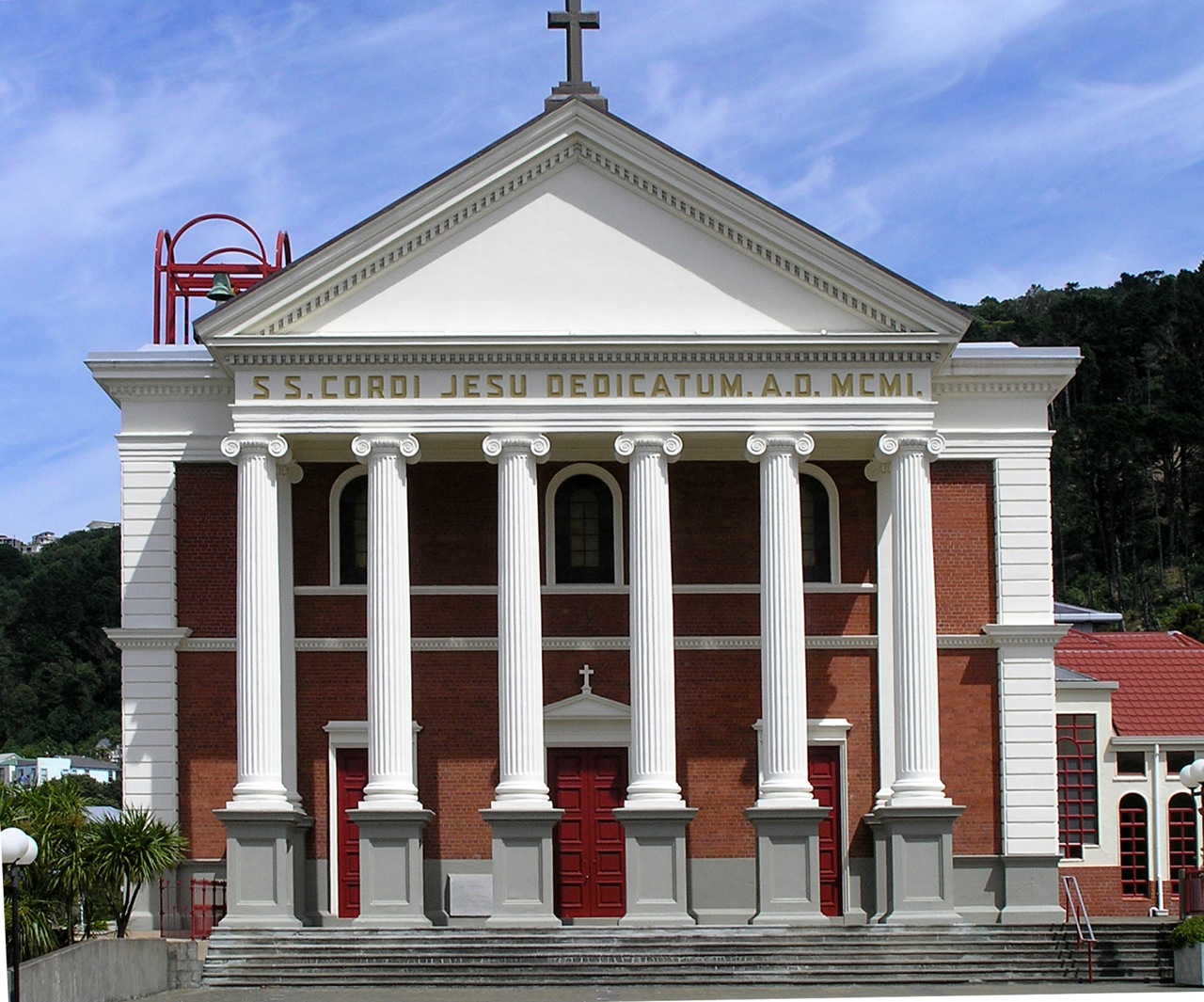
- Wellington, Hill St

- Location within New Zealand Wellington
- 41.2766°S 174.7762°E
- Location: Thorndon, Wellington Central City
- Country: New Zealand
- Denomination: Catholic
- Website: mcshwellington.org

History
- Former name: St Mary's Cathedral
- Founded: 1851; 175 years ago
- Founder(s): Philippe Viard, 1st Bishop of Wellington (St Mary's Cathedral, 1851); Francis Redwood, 2nd Bishop and 1st Archbishop of Wellington (Sacred Heart Cathedral, 1901)
- Dedication: 1901 125 years ago
- Consecrated: 18 March 1984

Architecture
- Heritage designation: Category I (2 April 1985)
- Architect: Francis Petre
- Architectural type: Cathedral
- Style: Palladian Revival
- Completed: 1901 125 years ago

Specifications
- Materials: Oamaru stone

Administration
- Archdiocese: Wellington
- Parish: Sacred Heart Cathedral Parish

Clergy
- Archbishop: Archbishop Paul Martin

The Metropolitan Cathedral of the Sacred Heart and of Saint Mary His Mother, better known as Sacred Heart Cathedral, is a Roman Catholic cathedral church on Hill Street, Wellington, New Zealand. It is the parish church of the Thorndon Catholic parish (founded 1850) and the seat of the Archbishop of Wellington. The New Zealand Parliament is a close neighbour of the cathedral. However, the Thorndon Catholic parish predates that institution. The cathedral is part of a Catholic precinct which includes: St Mary's College; Sacred Heart Cathedral School; St Mary's Convent, the motherhouse of the Sisters of Mercy in Wellington; the Catholic Centre, in which Catholic administration is located; and Viard House, which is both the cathedral parish presbytery and the residence of the archbishop.

The church was popularly known as "the Basilica", because of its palladian architectural style. It was designated as the cathedral of Wellington in 1984 after earthquake strengthening and the addition of the Blessed Sacrament chapel, foyer, sacristy, courtyard, hall (called Connolly Hall) and piazza. The parish of Thorndon was administered by the Society of Mary (Marist Fathers) for eighty-five years until 1935, although secular or diocesan clergy were also stationed there. The founder of the see, Bishop Viard, and the first two archbishops, Redwood and O'Shea, were also members of the Society of Mary. From 1954 all the archbishops and the resident clergy of the cathedral were secular clergy. However on 4 May 2023 the Marist residency was restored when Archbishop Paul Martin SM succeeded to the see.

Thorndon has always been the residence of the archbishops of Wellington except for the period 1935–1954 when Archbishop O'Shea continued to live at Paterson St, Mt Victoria which was his address as coadjutor.

On 13 July 2018, the main cathedral building was closed for seismic strengthening and renovation. After the $13 million renovation and strengthening the cathedral reopened in June 2024.

== History ==
The first church to be built on the Hill Street site was the wooden, neo-Gothic, St Mary's Cathedral, blessed and opened in 1851. It was gutted by fire on 28 November 1898, during repainting. It was decided that a new cathedral should be erected near Mt Victoria and a parish church built on the site of the old cathedral.

Exterior

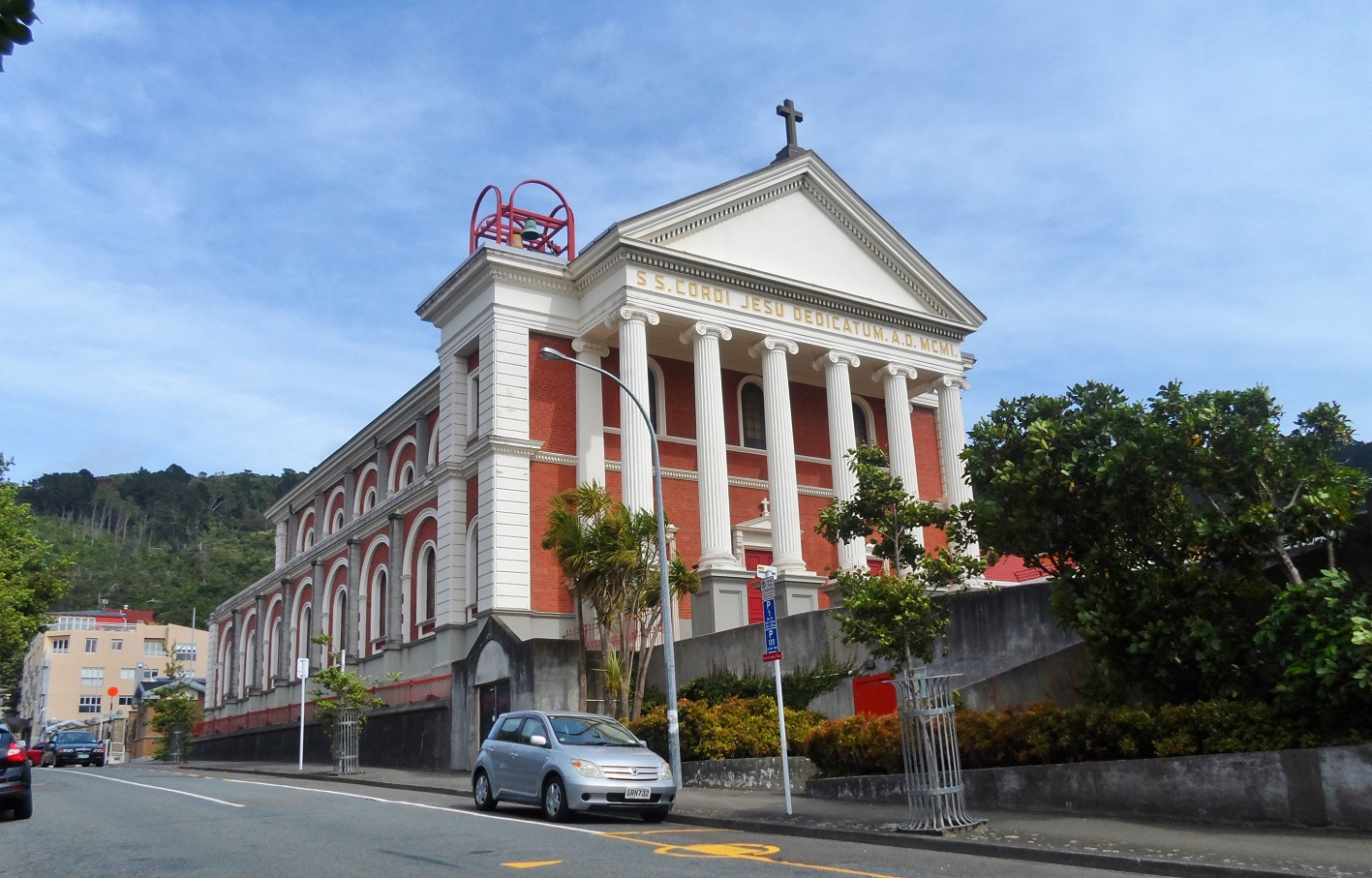
The Cathedral in 2015

However, the new parish church, called the Basilica of the Sacred Heart, was intended as a substantial building. Its foundation stone was laid in 1899 and the building blessed and opened two years later. The money to build Sacred Heart was partly taken from the fund for the new cathedral; the new cathedral was never actually built. It was not until 1984 that the Basilica was elevated to the status of a cathedral, and on 18 March 1984 the cathedral was consecrated by Cardinal Thomas Williams, the fifth Archbishop of Wellington. In 1985, the building was listed as a Category 1 Historic Place by Heritage New Zealand.

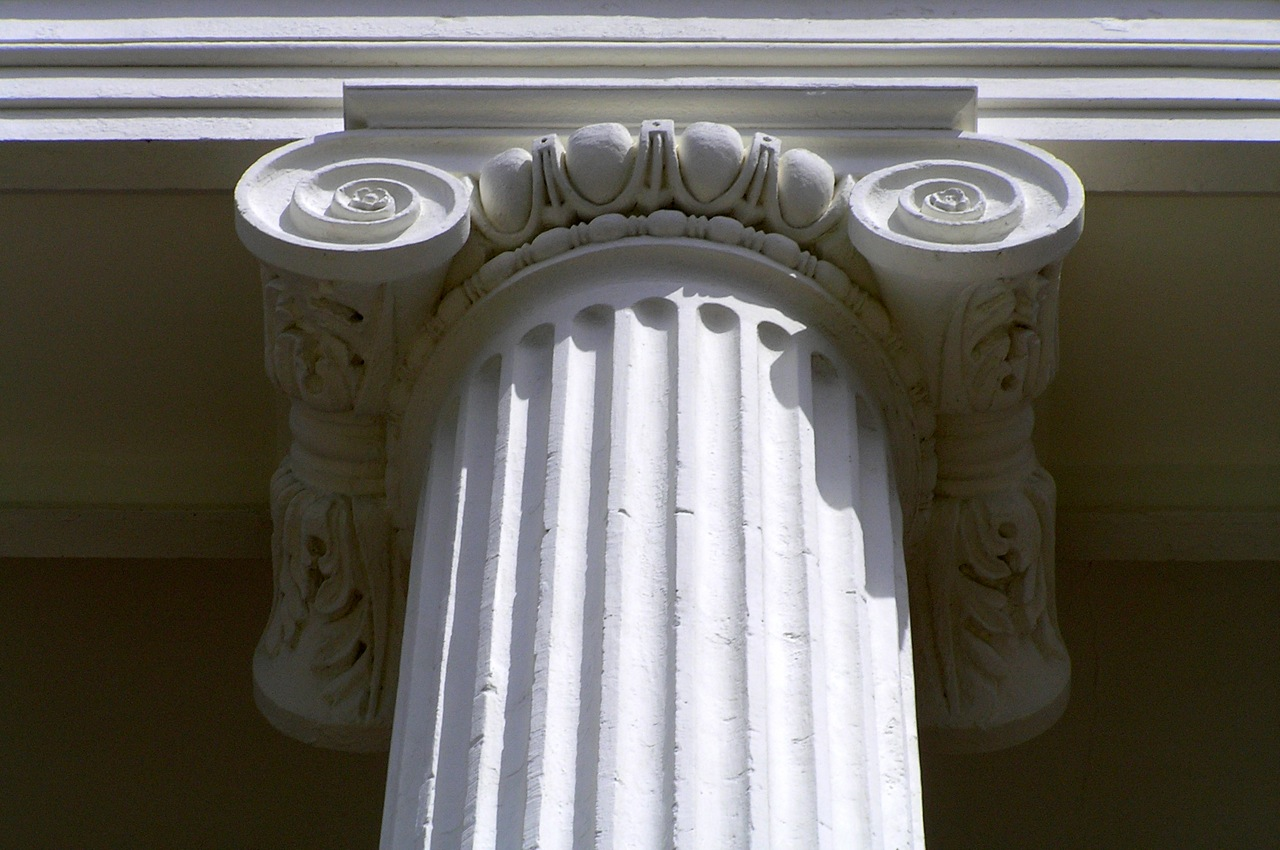
One of the portico columns with Ionic capital and entablature

The neo-classical basilica was designed by Francis Petre and was the only church Petre designed in the North Island. The building is a mixture of Oamaru stone, brick, and masonry.

The interior features a main aisle and two side aisles, a large arcaded nave and a large arch forming the entrance to the sanctuary. Walls are built in a succession of arches surmounted by a cornice of stone which forms part of the roof. Series of stone pilasters are ranged against the walls and on the sides of piers. The pilasters in the sanctuary form, with two free-standing columns supporting the cornice, a pleasing assemblage. Their capitals all continue the Ionic theme of the portico. To strengthen the building against earthquakes, concrete piers and steel beams were incorporated in the fabric of the building in 1983. The Blessed Sacrament chapel, the foyer entrance and the adjoining Connolly Hall were added to the cathedral in 1984. They are mainly constructed in concrete. At the same time a large square or piazza was constructed at the east end of the cathedral and this is used for processions and gathering space, especially on Palm Sunday, during Holy Week, and at Easter for the Service of the light and the candle-lit procession before the Easter Vigil Mass. For a period Sacred Heart looked even more palladian when it had twin bell towers topped with domes. These towers (not designed by Francis Petre) were incorporated in the original design but were removed in 1942, following an earthquake.

In 2018 the cathedral was closed due to a poor seismic strength rating. $13 million was spent on not only strengthening the church but also restoring details such as paintwork. The roof had steel inserted for strengthening and rods were installed into the columns for support. The cathedral reopened in June 2024. During the works a Carrara marble altarpiece from St Gerard's Monastery was installed in the church.

== Features ==
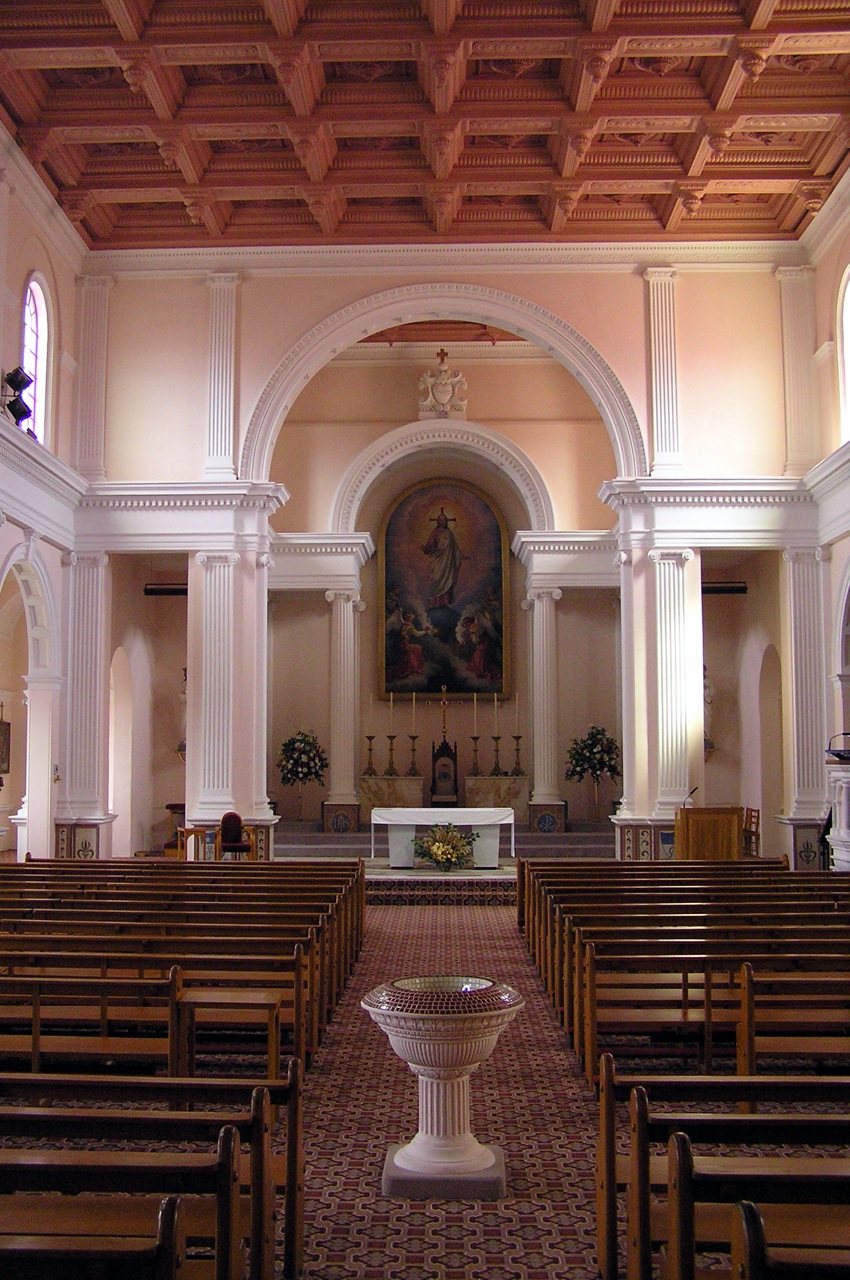
Interior in 2005; pressed metal ceiling; baptismal font in cross-aisle (approximate site of tomb of Bishop Viard is to the left of the font); painting by Enrico Refto and emblem of the Sacred Heart above the then high altar

=== Stonework ===
The previously-painted interior whitestonework of the cathedral has been restored to its natural cream-coloured state.

=== Ceiling ===
The cathedral has a painted pressed metal, Wunderlich ceiling.

=== High Altar ===
The marble altar is fronted by a three part mosaic of the annunciation, with the Angel Gabriel on the left and the Blessed Virgin on the right. between those are the words verbum caro factum est ("the word was made flesh"). The altar was given to Sacred Heart Cathedral to become the cathedral's high altar by the ICPE Mission when they closed St Gerard's Monastery in 2023.

=== Sacred Heart ===
The sanctuary is dominated by a large painting of the Sacred Heart of Jesus by Enrico Refto above the cathedra of the archbishop. At the top of the westernmost arch of the cathedral, above the sanctuary, is a large, sculpted, Oamaru stone emblem of the Sacred Heart.

=== Pulpit ===
The beautiful and ample pulpit just outside the sanctuary beside the northern aisle is still in use. It was installed in 1908 to commemorate the first parish priest of the new Basilica, Father W J Lewis SM, who died in 1907. He had been parish priest when the Basilica was being built. The pulpit was paid for by his fellow priests and records their sorrow at his demise. There was a memorial plaque which listed the details of Father Lewis' life on the adjoining pillar. This was removed to make way for one of the memorial crosses which signify the consecration of the church in 1984. The plaque may now be found at the top of the southern aisle of the cathedral. The names of all the bishops and archbishops in Wellington have recently been inscribed on the panels of the pulpit although the original dedication by the priests to the memory of Father Lewis remains recorded at the base of the structure.

=== Viard memorial ===
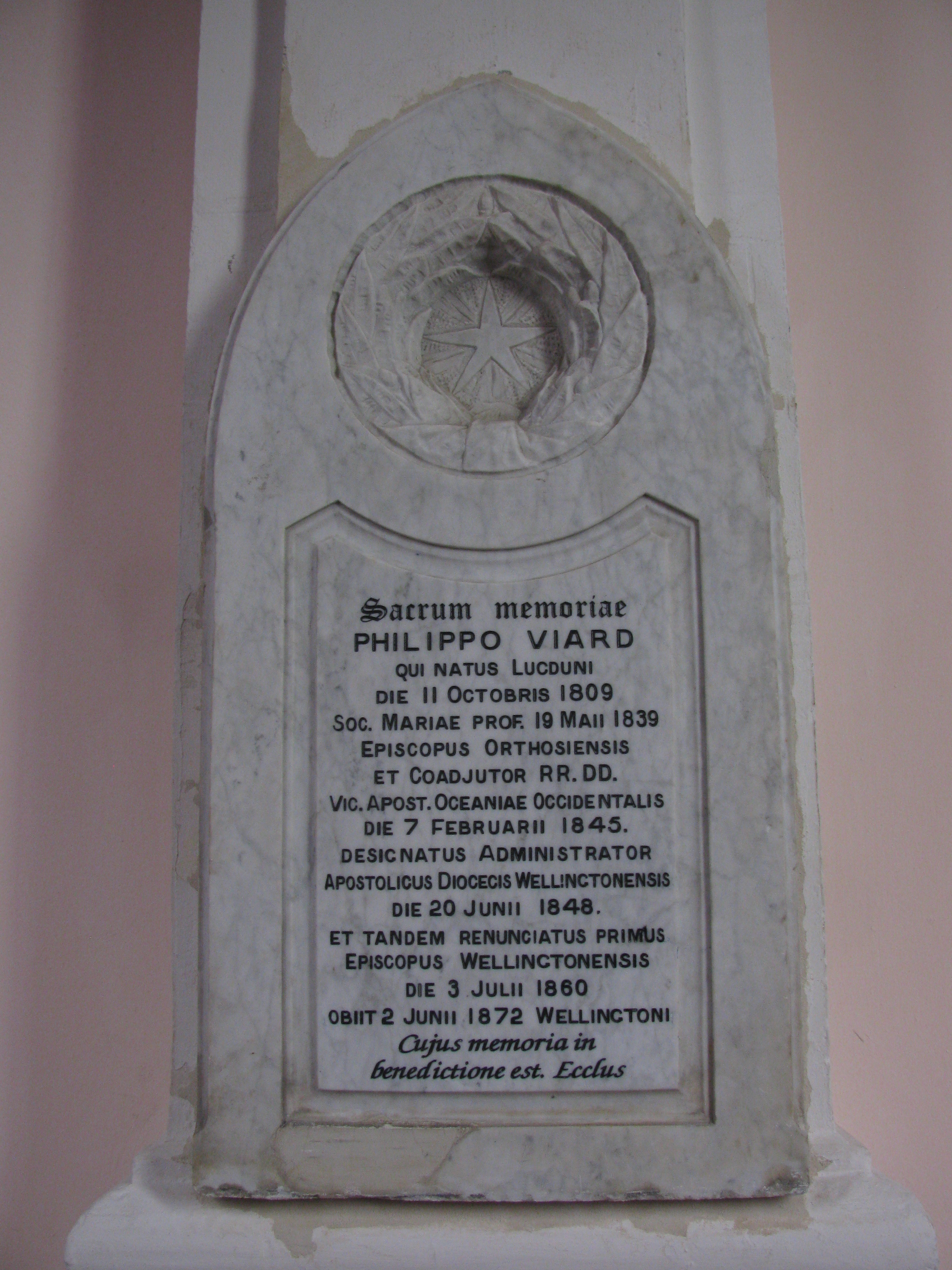
Latin memorial tablet for Bishop Viard originally placed in St Mary's Cathedral. Translation: Sacred to the Memory Philippe Viard Born Lyons 11 October 1809 Professed Society of Mary 19 May 1839 Consecrated Bishop of Orthosia & Coadjutor to the Vicar Apostolic Western Oceania 7 February 1845 Appointed Apostolic Administrator Diocese of Wellington 20 June 1848 Proclaimed First Bishop of Wellington 3 June 1860 Died Wellington 2 June 1872 His name is held in Benediction

On a pier beside the South Aisle are three memorial tablets (one in English and two in Latin) relating to Bishop Viard, the first Bishop of Wellington, who died in 1872 and is buried in the cathedral. He was originally buried in the old St Mary's Cathedral in a brick vault at the foot of Our Lady's Altar. His tomb in the present cathedral is approximately on the Hill St side of the baptismal font at the cross-aisle (see photograph above right). Four years later, the first parish priest of Thorndon, Father Jean Baptist Petitjean, who had arrived in Wellington with Bishop Viard in 1850, died in front of the same altar at the tomb of his bishop. Father Petitjean is also commemorated in Sacred Heart.

=== Chapel ===
The Blessed Sacrament Chapel, built to the north, at right angles to the main axis of the building, can accommodate about 60 worshippers. The chapel houses five examples of fine English Victorian stained glass from the studios of the Atkinson Brothers given by the parish of St Joseph, Mt Victoria. They were first placed in the original, octagonal, St Joseph's church in Buckle St in 1885. The central window is decorated with abstract designs. The other windows are of saints, two on each side. The saints are (on the left) Patrick and John and (on the right) Francis Xavier (with the notable astronomer Father David Francis Kennedy SM memorialised on this window) and, on the far right, St Peter. The windows " ... are a unique collection as no other building in the world contains more than two from these same workshops." The modern glass above the chapel doors was designed and fabricated by Graham Stewart of Christchurch. There is also a fine icon of the Sacred Heart of Jesus and St Mary his mother by contemporary iconographer Michael Galovic (installed in 2007).

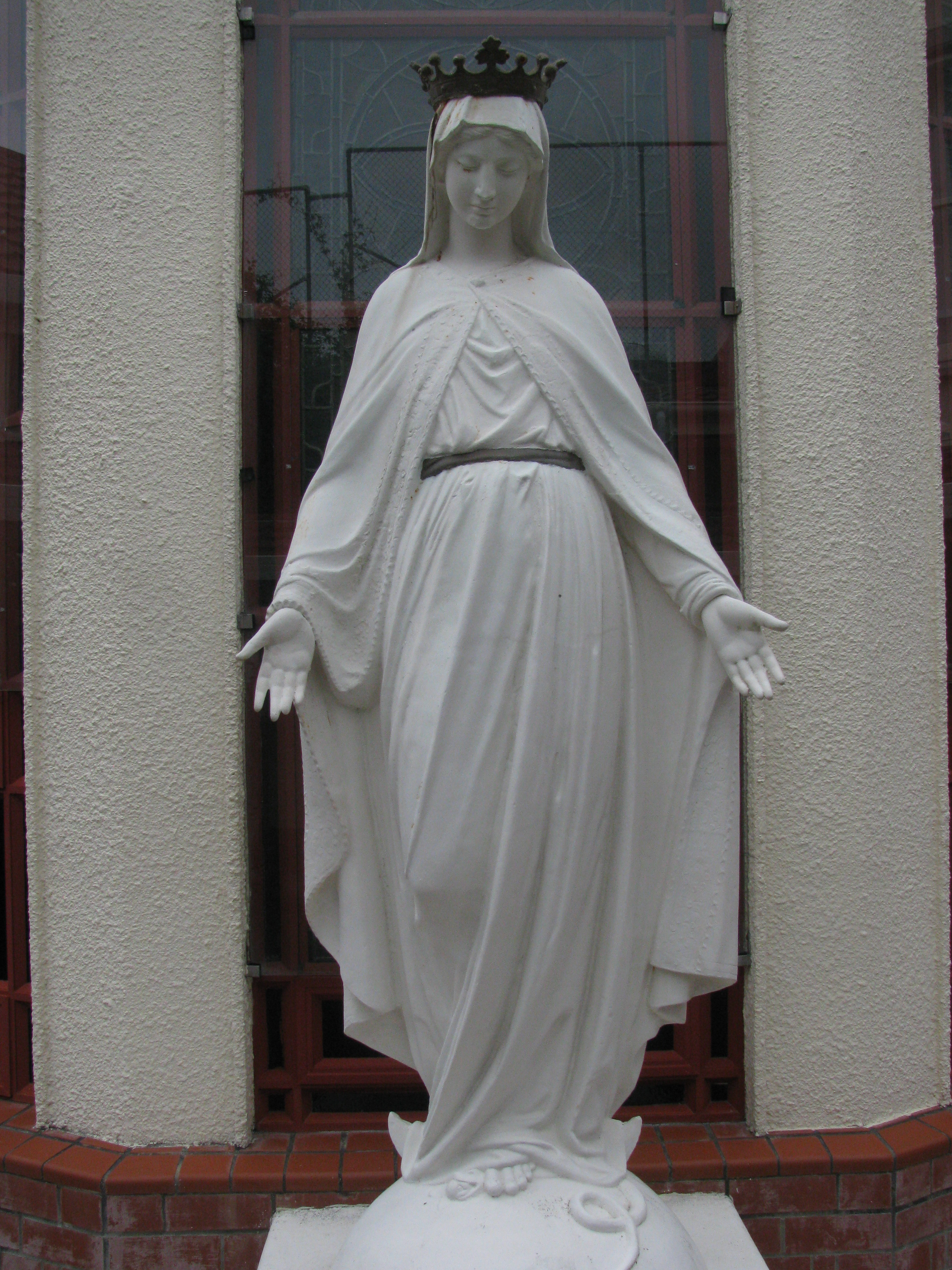
Statue of Blessed Virgin Mary in the cloister courtyard; windows of the Blessed Sacrament Chapel

In the west wall of the chapel is a small space or ambry where the holy oils (called chrism) are kept. The ambry is backed by a panel with a gold sculptured image of Christ on it. This panel was a door, once part of the tabernacle of the high altar of old St Mary's Cathedral. The front of the ambry has a wide red and yellow, glass, mosaic border (created by Con Kiernan) around the glassed-in space where can be seen the three glass, amphora-like, chrismaria containing the holy oils. These vessels and their contents are bathed in a somber green light.

Restoration of the chapel was completed in 2024 and it was reopened in December of that year.

=== Mary, mother of Jesus ===
In the cloister courtyard beside the foyer entrance of the cathedral stands the two-metre, cast-iron statue of the Blessed Virgin Mary, made in France ("with heavy Gilt") that was lodged, in honour of the Immaculate Conception on 8 September 1867, high up on the east side of the tower of the original cathedral, St Mary's Cathedral, where it faced the harbour and its gilding reflected "the first rays of the rising sun." The statue was placed in the tower in memory of the consecration of the diocese in 1855 to the Immaculate Conception, which Bishop Viard had carried out, after he had proclaimed the newly pronounced dogma, as a specific remedy against any recurrence of the series of severe earthquakes felt in the province of Wellington over several months in that year.

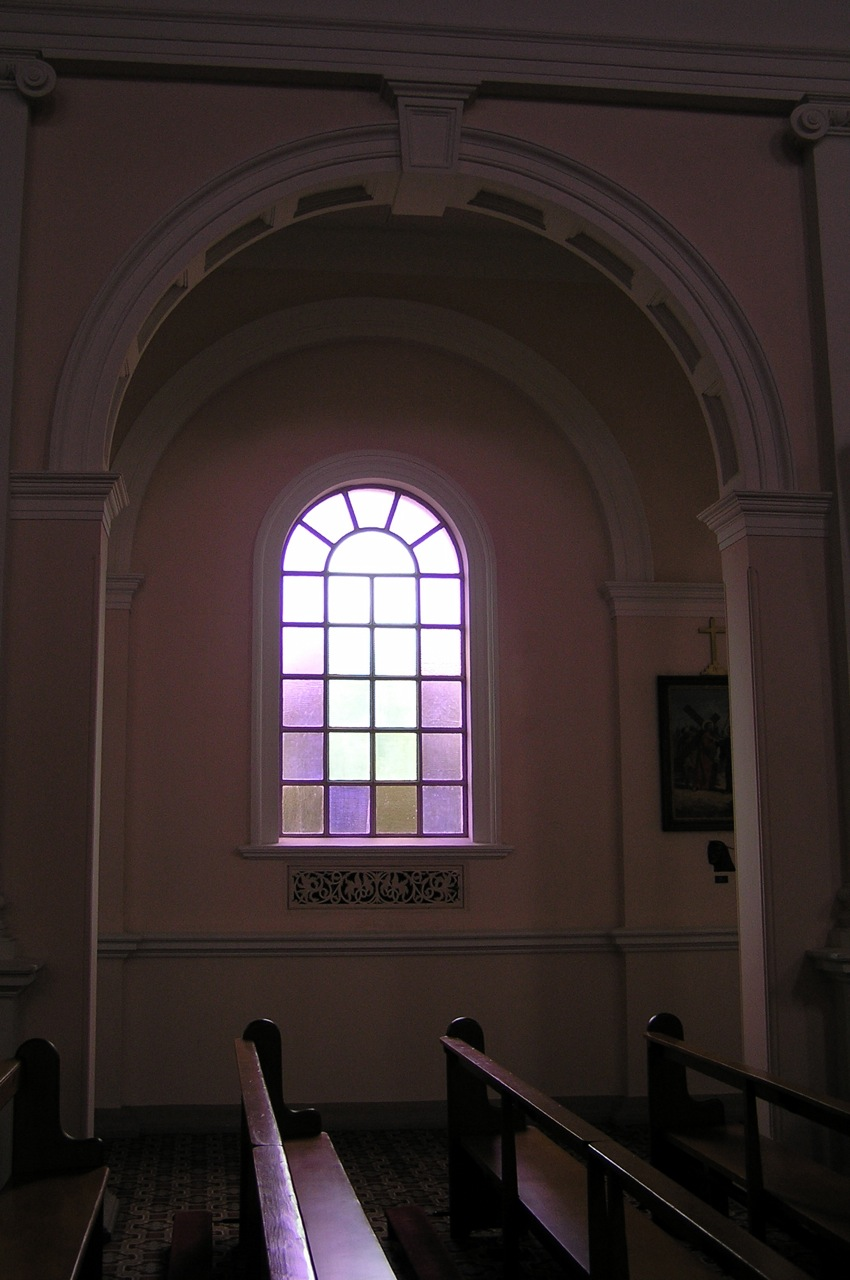
South aisle and window; to the right, a station of the cross with a "Mater Dolorosa" sculpture below it

The statue fell some 80 feet during the 1898 fire, crashing down from the tower. However it was later salvaged with minor damage. Some eyewitnesses attested that when the cathedral tower fell, the statue hung momentarily in mid air before descending slowly and gracefully and in an upright position to the ground where it landed completely undamaged. In 1984 the statue of Mary, now painted white except for the crown and girdle, was placed in the cloister courtyard to remain "the sign and warrant of her protection of the city."

=== Statuary and mosaics ===
Inside the cathedral at the entrance are small statues of the Four Evangelists. These originally stood under the first high altar of the present cathedral. Near the sanctuary is a statue of St Brigid, patron of St Brigid's Church, Wadestown, which was closed in 2007. Behind the cathedra in the sanctuary is a bronze and enamelled processional cross designed and made by Graham Stewart for the visit of Pope John Paul II to Wellington in 1986. The cross is used when the archbishop processes in the cathedral. The sanctuary contains some important mosaics. Beneath the Stations of the Cross is a set of fourteen bronzes, Mater Dolorosa, designed by Wellington sculptor, Eve Black, depicting Mary's sorrow as she witnessed her son's journey to the Cross and Grave. In 2023 a large statue of the Sacred Heart of Jesus was given to the cathedral from St Gerard's Church and Monastery and is located in the foyer at the entrance to the cathedral.

=== Taonga ===
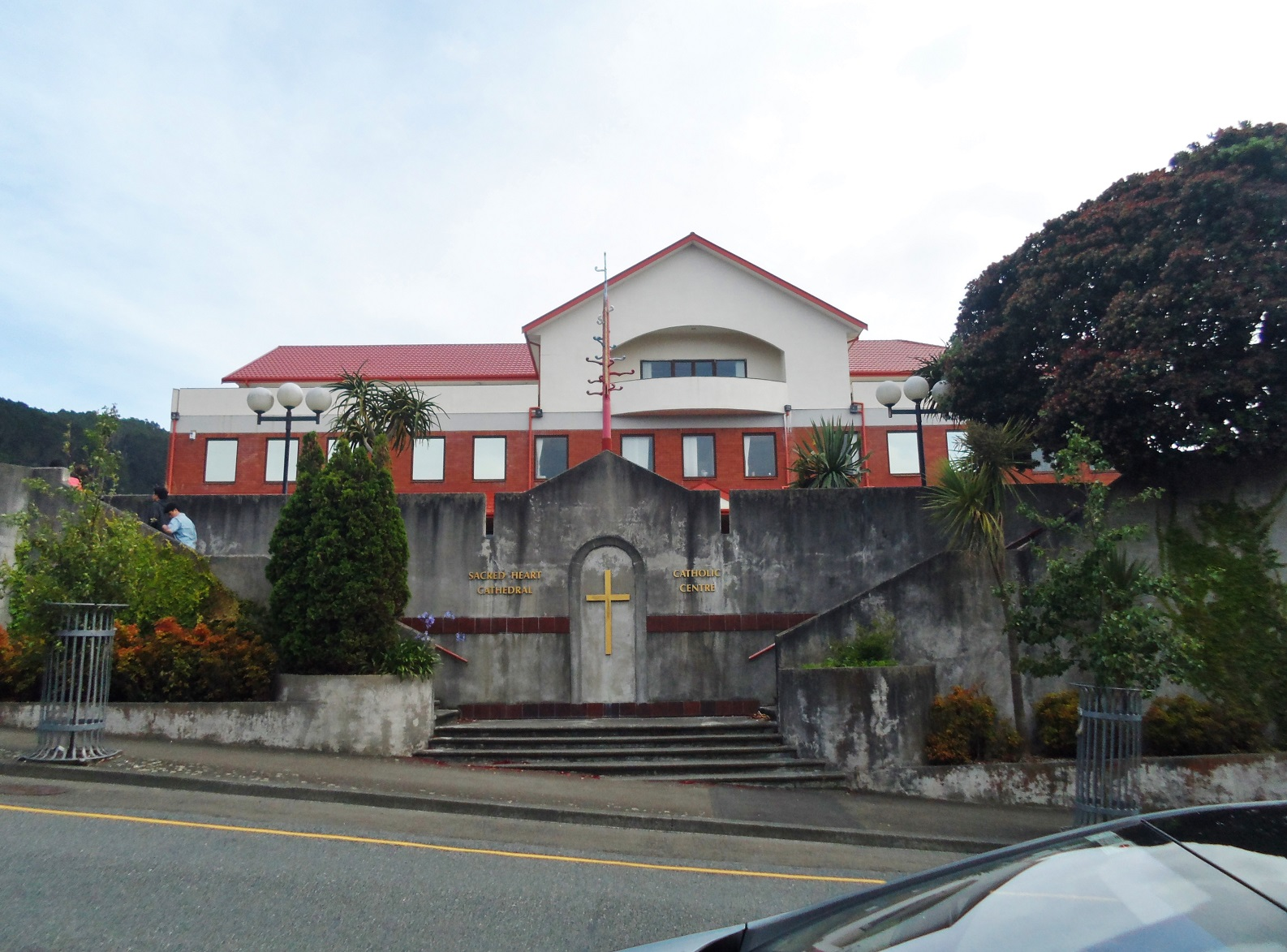
Steps to the piazza and entrance of the cathedral (carved pou above the cross); Catholic Centre (including the office of the Archbishop of Wellington) at the rear

Amongst the treasures of the cathedral are a 2-metre-high (6.6 ft) kohatu whakairo (thinking stone – a carved rock of Oamaru stone) situated inside the cathedral entrance and a pou (a carved wooden pole) in the piazza in front of the cathedral. The taonga were gifts from Catholic Māori of the archdiocese and were installed in 1989. They were carved by Porirua master carver Lou Kereopa. The kohato whakairo consists of several layers as follows. At the base, the solid foundation represents the faith given by Jesus Christ; above that, the essentials of that faith are then shown in panels on each of the four sides of the stone (the seven sacraments, the Ten Commandments, the crucified Saviour within the Holy Trinity, and the fourth panel is the cathedral itself represented by the initials "J" and "M" for Jesus and Mary with two hearts). The next layer shows on each panel four figures representing four aspects of faith from none to the full believing Christian (whose face is full on with a full moko). Together these four figures support the suffering world over which stands the church bearing Christ's light to the nations. This light is represented by a globe which is the world encircled by a crown of thorns representing human suffering and disobedience, and the sacrifice of Jesus who gave his life that human beings may live and have eternal life. The structure is crowned by a church portraying the shelter and joyful hope that the gospel offers. The cross surmounting the kohatu whakairo symbolises all who follow the way of Jesus.

== Music ==
=== Choral ===
Sacred Heart Cathedral has a strong music tradition. There are two instrumental (piano, guitars, organ) and vocal ensembles to lead congregational hymn-singing for at least one Sunday Mass each week.

There are normally two traditional choirs. The cathedral choir was made up of a dedicated group of trained singers. This choir sang on most Sundays at the cathedral at the 10.30am Mass as well as at concerts and special services. While firmly based on Gregorian chant, the choir sang (accompanied by one of the organs or the Cathedral Orchestra when that was appropriate) a wide repertoire ranging from Giovanni Pierluigi da Palestrina, Tomás Luis de Victoria, Thomas Tallis and William Byrd to George Frideric Handel, Wolfgang Amadeus Mozart, Franz Schubert, Samuel Sebastian Wesley, Anton Bruckner, Gabriel Fauré, Herbert Howells, Maurice Duruflé, Ildebrando Pizzetti, Morten Lauridsen, James MacMillan, Douglas Mews, Eric Whitacre, Ola Gjeilo and many other composers including occasional commissioned contemporary works.

The boys' choir was made up of about 15 boys from the neighbouring Sacred Heart Cathedral School. Each boy received a scholarship which paid for weekly individual vocal tuition and theory lessons. The boys sang an occasional Choral Mass during school term.

The Cathedral Grand Organ was situated in the choir loft and the console in the whispering gallery. It was designed and built by Arthur Hobday in 1905 and had been revised and enlarged since with the changing needs of the cathedral.

Sacred Heart Cathedral was also a well-used concert venue (500 people can be seated) for outside orchestras and performance groups because of the building's size and its fine "warm" acoustics.

With the closure of the cathedral for seismic strengthening in 2018, the organ was removed in 2020 for reconstruction. The cathedral choir and the boy's choir operated for a two-year period in other locations but both went into abeyance in March 2021 when the post of Sacred Heart Cathedral Director of Music was abolished. The situation will be reviewed when the restoration of the cathedral is completed.

=== Historic ceremonies ===
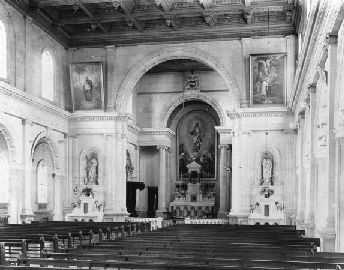
Interior (c. 1901); showing the pre-Vatican II ordering

The cathedral choir plays a prominent role in liturgical ceremonies in the cathedral. Its role in two important state funerals and an episcopal anniversary was of particular note.

Sir Joseph Ward, the 17th Prime Minister of New Zealand, died in July 1930. Ward had prayed daily in the Basilica (or its predecessor, St Mary's Cathedral – see below) for all of his thirty-seven years as a member of the New Zealand Parliament. The Requiem Mass was celebrated on 9 July by Bishop O'Shea (then Coadjutor Archbishop of Wellington), and Archbishop Redwood, the 1st Archbishop of Wellington, delivered the panegyric. In the words of The New Zealand Herald, "unbent beneath the weight of his 91 years ... in his scarlet vestment, [Archbishop Redwood] was a commanding and impressive figure." After the Mass, Ward's casket lay in the Basilica where a steady stream of people came and went during the day. It was then transferred across the road to Parliament Buildings by his colleagues and family before being transported to Bluff where the interment took place.

Michael Joseph Savage, the 23rd, and 1st Labour, Prime Minister of New Zealand, died on 27 March 1940. His funeral gave the cathedral choir a chance to achieve national recognition, as it was broadcast nationally. The organist was Miss Josephine Mulligan whose contributions included Frédéric Chopin's Marche Funebre at the commencement. The choir consisted of male voices conducted by Rev Father FH Walsh. The Dominion thought that "it was appropriate because of the interest of the late Prime Minister in young people that boys figured largely in the singing of the Mass" which was entirely sung in plain song. The crowd was so great in the church – even the organist needed an official invitation – that the boys in the choir were forced to sing from the chancel galleries high above the altar. The solemn requiem was celebrated by Archbishop O'Shea who in his sermon preached that Savage's life "was a rebuke to all who would seek to advance their interests, whether personal or class, at the expense of social amity and concord" and that Savage would "not leave a single enemy among decent men." Savage's remains were transported to Auckland in a rail journey much interrupted by crowds of mourners along the way. After resting briefly in St Patrick's Cathedral, he was buried at Bastion Point (where the Savage Memorial was eventually constructed).

Another great choir occasion occurred earlier, in 1934, for the 60th episcopal anniversary of Archbishop Redwood himself, when "the special music of the Mass was rendered by the Basilica choir of fifty voices under the conductorship of Miss Eileen Dennehy. Miss Josephine Mulligan was at the organ. The music of the Mass was as follows: 'Ecce Sacerdos' (Elgar), Edouard Silas' Mass in C, 'O Sacrum Convivium', and 'Jubilate Deo' ... the plain song was sung by the male voices of the choir, under the baton of Rev. Father Feehly."

== See also ==
- St Mary's Cathedral, Wellington
- Francis Petre and Sacred Heart Cathedral, Wellington
- Sacred Heart Cathedral School, Thorndon
- St Mary's College, Wellington
- Sisters of Mercy
- Roman Catholic Archdiocese of Wellington
- St Gerard's Church and Monastery
- St Joseph's Church, Mt Victoria
- St Mary of the Angels, Wellington
- Catholic Church in New Zealand
- Holy Cross College, New Zealand
- Holy Name Seminary
- List of basilicas in New Zealand
