= Maxwell Fernie =

New Zealand musician (1910–1999)

Arnott Maxwell Fernie OBE (25 April 1910 – 22 May 1999) was a New Zealand organist, teacher and conductor. He was an authority on Gregorian chant, sixteenth century polyphony, organ construction and tonal design.

== Life ==
Fernie was born in Wellington on 25 April 1910 and received his first schooling from the Marist Brothers in Newtown and later at Wellington College. He became a leader in church music while still a young man, taking up the position of choir master and organist at St Joseph's Catholic Church, Wellington.

At the outbreak of World War II, Fernie served with the second New Zealand Expeditionary Force in Egypt and Europe. At the end of the war he stayed on in England to study at the Royal Academy of Music in London, gaining several prizes.

Fernie returned to Wellington in the early 1950s as the director of music for Catholic Schools in the Archdiocese, a position he held until 1953 when he was called back to London as organist and choir instructor at Westminster Cathedral.

After five acclaimed years of intensive organ playing, music making and teaching, he returned to New Zealand to become the Director of Music at St. Mary of the Angels where he supervised the building of the new organ constructed to his design. Fernie's development of sixteenth century polyphony at St. Mary of the Angels became a model for Roman Catholic Church choirs.

In the following years, Fernie schooled choirs, taught piano, organ and singing, and trained celebrated musicians. His notable students included Nicolas Kynaston, Ivan Bootham, Patricia Lawrey, Anthony Jennings, Peter Walls, Denis Smalley, Geoffrey Coker, Roy Tankersley, Christopher Hainsworth and Barry Mora. As well as being a well-known broadcaster and lecturer, he founded and conducted the Schola Polyphonica Choir (specialising in 16th Century polyphony) in 1967. He was Wellington city organist for 27 years and played the Town Hall's massive Norman & Beard pipe organ on numerous occasions for civic receptions and supervised its restoration in the 1980s. From 1963 till 1988 he taught a new generation of young organists at Victoria University of Wellington, helping to bring about an organ renaissance in New Zealand.

In 1978, Fernie was commissioned to arrange new music for the New Zealand national anthem God Defend New Zealand, making it easier for the general public to sing.

He continued as Director of Music at St Mary's until his death on 22 May 1999.

== Honours and awards ==
Fernie was appointed an Officer of the Order of the British Empire in the 1974 Queen's Birthday Honours, for services to music. He received the Pro Ecclesia et Pontifice from the Roman Catholic Church in 1989.

== The Maxwell Fernie Organ ==
The organ at St Mary of the Angels was named after its designer and organist of 40 years, Maxwell Fernie in 2006. The organ was originally built in 1958 by George Croft and Son Limited from Auckland to the tonal design and pipe-scaling of Maxwell Fernie, who also supervised the voicing of the pipes and the construction of the instrument.

According to Maxwell Fernie: "The organ possesses some unique features. The Diapason choruses on both Swell and Great are of "constant scale" and wholly of Schultze-type voicing and scale with generous treble measurements. The swell-reed chorus is complete and independent, voiced in keeping with the large Gothic-type church which houses the three-manual and pedal instrument in the west gallery. The positive section contains probably the first examples of solo flute-mutations in New Zealand and the whole instrument is flexible in the extreme owing to a generous number of inter-manual and pedal couplers. Tonally it might be said that the organ, with mainly pipes from England and parts from Germany, the Netherlands and United States has a Continental flavour...acknowledging all schools of composition of the various periods and nationalities. It amply fulfils its prime function as a church organ, and various famous recitalists have praised its ability to enable them to 'make music', without tonal restrictions in their recitals".

It is the only organ of its type in New Zealand. It comprises three manuals and pedals with some sixty-five speaking stops and a great many coupling options that give the instrument a unique flexibility to interchange the stops or sounds available between the manuals.

In 1984 the instrument was extensively rebuilt and extended by the South Island Organ Company of Timaru, once again to the specifications designed by Maxwell Fernie and under his careful supervision.

During the period following the 1984 rebuild, the organ suffered serious water and some rodent damage. This particularly affected the right-hand side of the instrument, the section containing parts of the Great, Positive and Pedal organ. Damage to the wind chests, some of the wooden pipes and to the electro-mechanical working of the organ affected the instrument to the extent that several ranks of pipes no longer functioned.

An appeal launched in December 2006 raised funds sufficient to restore the organ to its 1958 performance condition and also, to replace the original electrical circuitry with a modern computerised system. The appeal was coordinated by the Friends of St. Mary of the Angels Charitable Trust and involved the wider Wellington community. The organ was decommissioned by the South Island Organ Company following Easter 2006. The fully restored instrument was welcomed back at a celebration on 29 April 2007.
