= St Mary's Cathedral, Wellington =

St Mary's Cathedral
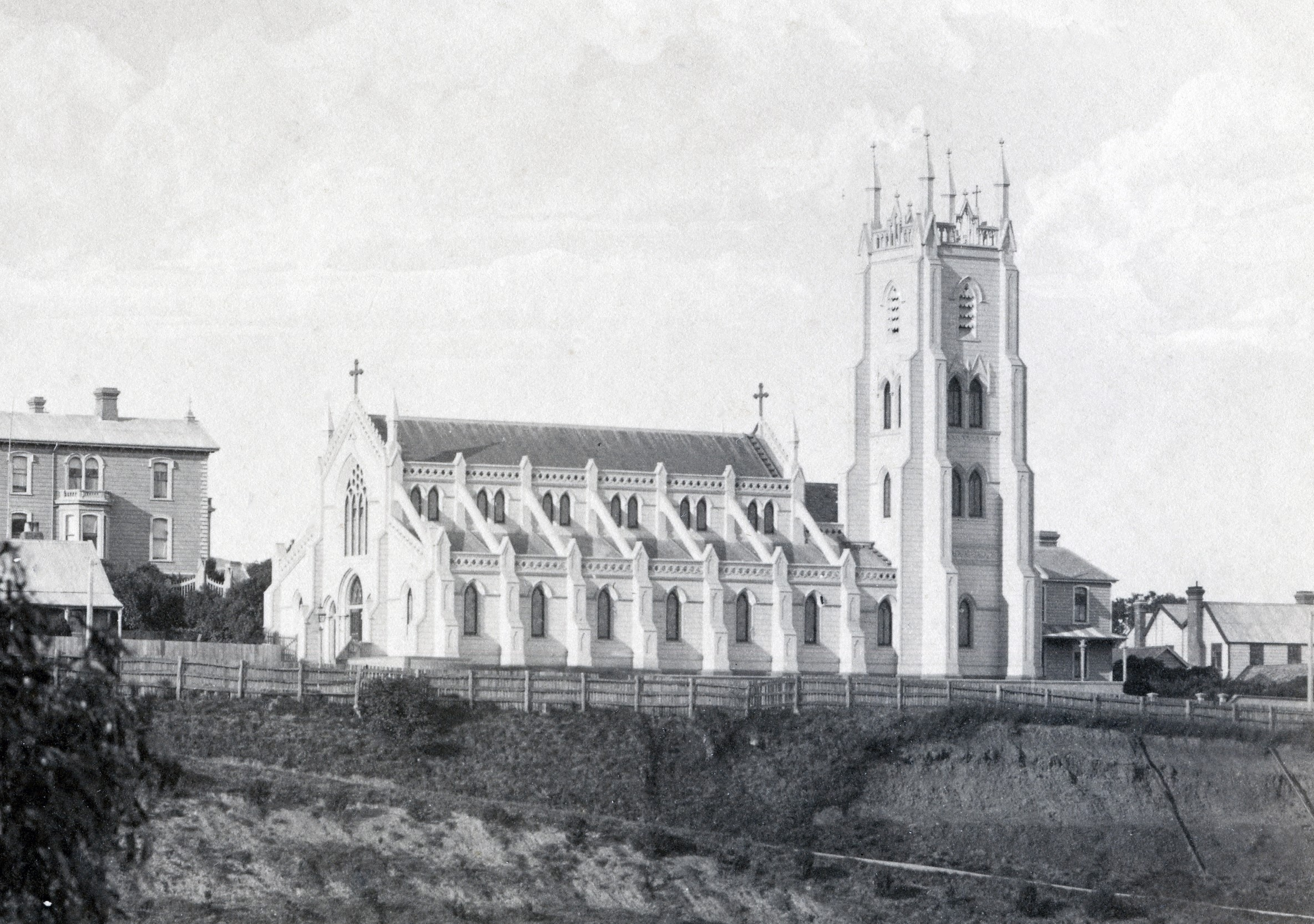
- St Mary's Cathedral in the 1880s, prior to its destruction
- St Mary's Cathedral
- 41°16′36″S 174°46′34″E
- Location: Thorndon, Wellington Central City
- Country: New Zealand
- Previous denomination: Catholic

History
- Status: Cathedral (first church) (1851 – 1898)
- Founded: 1851
- Founder: Philippe Viard, 1st Bishop of Wellington
- Consecrated: 7 December 1851 (the feast of the Immaculate Conception)

Architecture
- Functional status: Destroyed by fire
- Architect: Christian Julius Toxward
- Architectural type: Church
- Style: Gothic Revival
- Groundbreaking: 1850
- Completed: 1867
- Demolished: 1898 (by fire)

Specifications
- Capacity: 500
- Length: 33 metres (108 ft)
- Width: 18 metres (58 ft)
- Height: 32 metres (106 ft)
- Materials: Predominately New Zealand timber, such as tōtara and rimu; slate and lead

St Mary's Cathedral was a Roman Catholic cathedral located in Wellington, New Zealand. Completed in 1851, the cathedral served as the mother church for the Archdiocese of Wellington and the seat of the Catholic Bishop of Wellington until the building was destroyed by fire in 1898.

When the building reached its final form in 1867, it became an important landmark in Wellington and its situation on Golder's Hill in Thorndon meant that it could be seen from many parts of the city and from points around the Wellington Harbour. Its beautiful, gilded statue of the Blessed Virgin Mary, high up on the tower, and the gilded crosses on its parapets, gables and tower were particularly admired features.

== Site ==
On 1 May 1850, the barque Clara arrived in Wellington Harbour from Auckland bringing the first bishop of the diocese, Philippe Joseph Viard, S.M. Within three weeks of his arrival, accumulated funds collected by Catholics were placed in a special bank account at his disposal, and the site for the new cathedral was bought in Thorndon. The site is now occupied by Sacred Heart Cathedral, Wellington and Sacred Heart Cathedral School. The bishop also chose as the site for his mission, two sections adjoining this, both in Hawkestone Street, now occupied by St Mary's College. These sections were given by the Hon. Henry Petre. The three sections were vested in the bishop in 1853 by a Settlement of Wellington Town Grant. This was confirmed later by a Crown grant.

== Opening ==
On 8 September 1850, on "a lovely day, bright, calm," the feast of the birthday of Mary, Bishop Viard laid, "with a procession and all form", the foundation stone of the church which was to be his cathedral. The ceremony was attended by over 2,000 people. The Cathedral of St Mary was complete enough to be blessed and opened for worship on Sunday 7 December 1851, the eve of the feast of the Immaculate Conception. Some finishing work still remained to be done, but the Bishop wanted the context of the feast day, for the cathedral was being dedicated to Mary under that title. A reporter said: "The consecration, including the celebration of Mass, occupied something more than four hours."

== Neighbours ==
When the cathedral commenced, Hill St did not exist and access had to be gained to the site from Hawkestone St. The area was semi-rural and a little isolated. The expansion of Wellington was taking place along the Lambton Quay shore of Wellington Harbour and south towards Te Aro. But after the New Zealand Constitution Act 1852 was passed by the United Kingdom Parliament, the buildings of the Wellington Provincial Council were opened across Hill St from the cathedral. Hill St was then newly constructed and St Mary's Cathedral was the most prominent feature on it. In 1865, the Provincial Buildings were occupied permanently by the New Zealand Parliament when the capital of New Zealand was transferred from Auckland to Wellington.

== Completion ==
Building the cathedral continued slowly and in 1865 Bishop Viard appealed for funds. Sufficient was raised to extend the sanctuary and build a tower 32 metres high, whose important feature was a recess for a cast-iron statue of Our Lady which arrived from France in 1867 in time for the feast of the Nativity of Our Lady on 8 September. The statue was placed in the tower in memory of the consecration of the diocese in 1855 to the Immaculate Conception, which Bishop Viard had carried out, after he had proclaimed the newly pronounced dogma, as a specific remedy against any recurrence of the series of severe earthquakes felt in the province of Wellington over several months in that year. St Mary's Cathedral was considered "without exception the finest ecclesiastical structure in the colony". The expanded cathedral was opened by Bishop Viard on Christmas Day, 1867. It was designed by Christian Julius Toxward, who also designed the first synagogue in Wellington and the transepts added to Old St Paul's.

== Expansion ==
Bishop Viard died on Sunday 2 June 1872. His funeral was presided over by Bishop Patrick Moran of Dunedin. He was buried in a brick-lined grave in the cathedral in front of Mary's shrine with some pomp. After the Requiem Mass and a subsequent long funeral procession around the streets of Wellington as far as Te Aro, 1,500 people of all denominations crowded the cathedral for the burial. On 26 November 1874, Viard's successor, Francis Redwood, was received "solemnly and canonically" in the cathedral "then unfinished except in the chancel". Redwood eventually installed a marble altar and a new organ in the cathedral but he did not think that the cathedral was adequate and in 1892 he put before the clergy in synod assembled the choice of either building a new cathedral or enlarging, improving and finishing the existing one. Constrained by the opinion of his clergy, who considered the diocese could not afford the cost of a new building, he commenced to do these things at a cost of £5,000. Repainting a section of the tower proved necessary when part of the original work was below standard and had blistered.

== Destruction ==
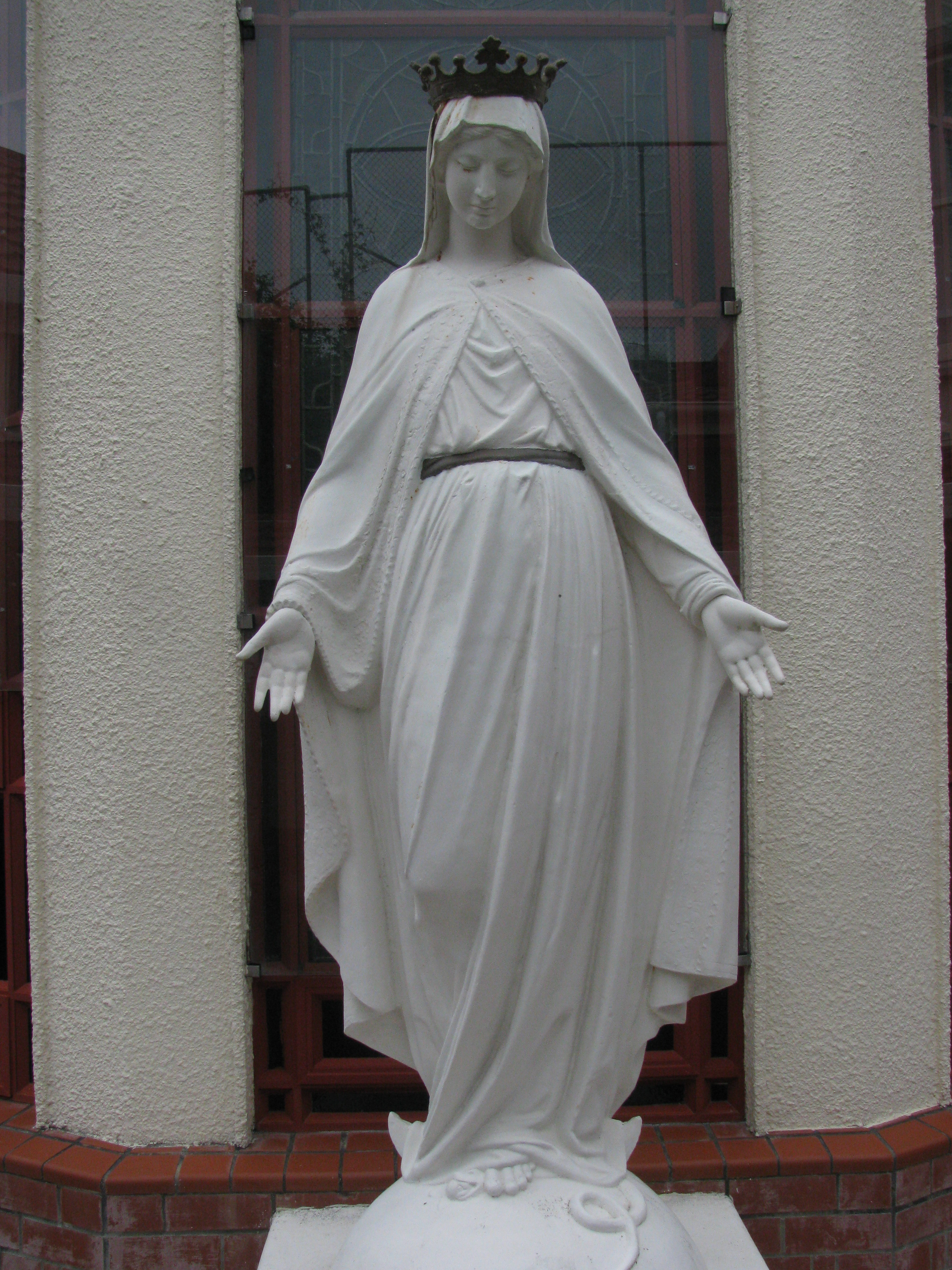
The statue of the Blessed Virgin Mary, as it is in 2014, no longer gilded, in the cloister courtyard of Sacred Heart Cathedral.

At approximately 8:30 am on Monday 28 November 1898, the dry timber of the tower of the cathedral caught alight when a workman was burning off old paint. The horse-drawn fire engine was slow to arrive, water pressure on the hill was low. Fanned by a southerly, the fire gradually took hold, burning upwards through the funnel of the tower and downwards until the nave was engulfed. Bystanders, including Sisters of Mercy, saved some sanctuary furnishings before the fire chief declared the building too dangerous to enter, and efforts were concentrated on stopping the blaze spreading to surrounding buildings. The cast-iron statue crashed down from the tower, but was later salvaged with minor damage. However, some eyewitnesses attested that when the cathedral tower fell, the statue hung momentarily in mid-air before descending slowly and gracefully and in an upright position to the ground, where it landed completely undamaged. It took about three hours for the cathedral to be reduced to a smouldering ruin.

== Replacement ==
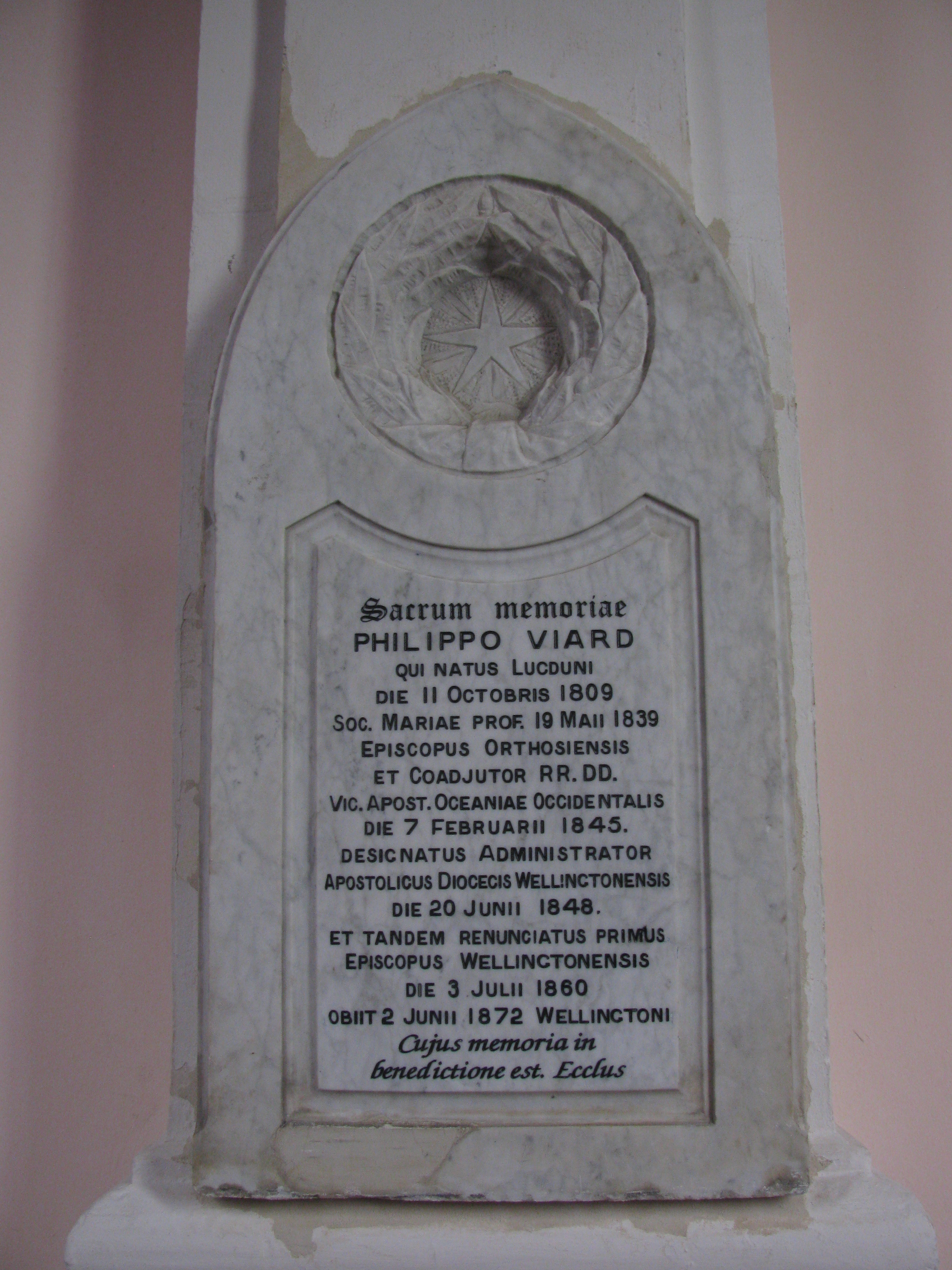
Latin memorial tablet for Bishop Viard in Sacred Heart Cathedral originally placed at his grave in St Mary's Cathedral. Translation:Sacred to the Memory Philippe Viard Born Lyons 11 October 1809 Professed Society of Mary 19 May 1839 Consecrated Bishop of Orthosia & Coadjutor to the Vicar Apostolic Western Oceania 7 February 1845 Appointed Apostolic Administrator Diocese of Wellington 20 June 1848 Proclaimed First Bishop of Wellington 3 June 1860 Died Wellington 2 June 1872 His name is held in Benediction

Redwood treated the fire as providential, and decided to replace the destroyed cathedral with a new parish church for Thorndon and to transfer the title "St Mary's" to a new cathedral to be built on the corner of Tory St and Buckle St adjacent to St Patrick's College, Wellington. This projected site was changed several times, but the new St Mary's Cathedral was never built. The pursuit of the new cathedral was fruitless for many reasons, principally lack of money. This meant that Wellington was without an official Catholic cathedral until 1984. The parish church to replace St Mary's Cathedral in Thorndon, the Basilica of the Sacred Heart, was opened on 3 February 1901. For the next 83 years it was the usual de facto cathedral until, in 1984, the basilica was officially designated as the cathedral of the Archdiocese of Wellington, and, with the inclusion of the old dedication of "St Mary's", it was dedicated and consecrated in that year under the title of "Metropolitan Cathedral of the Sacred Heart of Jesus and of St Mary his mother".

== Architecture ==
The Wellington Independent, in describing St Mary's Cathedral when its extensions were nearing completion in December 1867, stated that the original building opened in 1851 was lengthened by 10 metres (33 ft) and that the early English Gothic or decorated style had been adopted. The building was in the form of a parallelogram with a "lofty and imposing" tower in the southeast corner. This replaced the original tower. The cathedral measured 33 metres (108 ft) in length and 18 metres (58 ft) in width. The whole of the building stood on the original brick foundation, and was built mainly of New Zealand timber, such as tōtara and rimu. The outside boarding was tōtara. The woodwork was painted, sanded and rebated or rusticated, which the Wellington Independent stated had "been found to be the best mode of protecting wood in these colonies" and it was applied for that purpose and not "for the purpose of imitating stone." The roof of the cathedral was covered with slates, but for the spire of the tower 61b lead was used. "The building, taken as a whole, is one of the finest, if not the finest, ecclesiastical structure in the colony and does infinite credit to its architect, who has succeeded in producing a work at once elegant and durable." The site "has also been singularly well chosen, as it can be seen from all parts of the town and the harbour" where its beautiful gilded statue and crosses could be seen glinting by all.

=== Exterior ===
The main entrance was at the west end with three Gothic, panelled doors. In the centre and over the doors was a geometrical pointed tracery window, glazed with coloured glass. At the same end were two pointed windows one on each side to light the aisles. The west end parapets were capped by a five feet high gilded Latin cross. Each side of the central nave or "clear story" wall of the cathedral was supported by seven buttresses. The lower aisles were supported by eight buttresses on each side. Between each of these buttresses was a pointed window. On the sides of the clear story, between the flying buttresses and immediately above the lower aisle windows, were similar windows but double and pointed. There were two gables at the east end of the cathedral, of which that covering the sanctuary was lower than the other, which belonged to the nave. Both were crowned with gilded crosses. The lighting was provided by a triple window with a smaller one of a circular form. The ensemble of architectural features gave "the structure a light and graceful appearance."

=== Tower ===
The square tower stood at the south-east corner of the building, rising to a height of 32 metres (106 ft). It was supported to a height of 21 metres (68 ft) by buttresses. About one foot above the third floor of the tower were four double pointed arched openings, fitted with moveable louvres for the cathedral bells. At a height of 16 metres (54 ft), facing east, in a niche, surmounted by a canopy, there stood “ upon a halfglobe, a beautiful gilded statue of the Madonna”, 2.21 metres (7 ft 3 in) in height. This had the inscription: "This statue was presented and blessed by the Right Reverend Philip Joseph Viard, Bishop of Wellington, on the eighth day of September, 1867. Virgo Immaculata, orare pro nobis." (translated: "Virgin Immaculate, pray for us"). The east gable of the tower was surmounted by a five pointed star indicating the star seen in the east at the Nativity. On the west gable, were the initials interwoven, "A. M." for "Ave Maria." Facing north and south was a gilded cross. From the top of the parapet rose the spire, crowned by a gilded wrought iron Latin cross, 1.8 metres (6 ft) in height.

=== Interior ===
The interior of the building was dominated by a lofty nave, 21 metres (70 ft) in length, 6.1 metres (20 ft) wide, and 12 metres (40 ft) high in the centre, the height from the floor to the beginning of the roof being 8.2 metres (27 ft). On each side of the nave was an aisle of similar length. At the end of the nave was the sanctuary the ceiling of which was executed in plaster and in the form of a pointed arch. The ceiling sprang from a cornice and frieze ornamented with leaves and Quatrefoils. The walls were plastered to within 6 feet from the floor. The dado round the walls was 1.8 metres (6 ft) high of figured, varnished, red pine, gothic panels. St. Mary's and St. Joseph's chapels, the roofs of each also plastered, were on each side of the sanctuary. There was also a sacristy beside the sanctuary. A choir loft was erected at the west end. The cathedral accommodated about five hundred worshippers.

=== Toxward's style ===
John Stacpoole, an architectural historian, in discussing the many wooden ecclesiastical buildings designed by Christian Julius Toxward, has stated that "St Mary's was the most interesting, being quite different from any other interpretation of the Gothic style so far seen in New Zealand." This style was especially noted for his false buttresses "in all directions." Clasping buttresses were topped with spirelets, and nave buttresses were carried above the eaves lines and joined by pierced parapets. "St Mary's - a church with a clerestory - had flying buttresses as well. Great play was made with valances and gable crestings ... while even the undersides of the flying buttresses were deeply toothed. It was all very un-English."
