= Archdiocese of Wellington =

Catholic archdiocese in New Zealand

Coordinates: 41°16′37″S 174°46′33″E

Archdiocese of Wellington Archidioecesis Vellingtonensis

Catholic

Location
- Country: New Zealand
- Territory: Southern North Island and Northern South Island
- Episcopal conference: New Zealand Catholic Bishops' Conference
- Ecclesiastical province: Province of Wellington

Statistics
- Area: 13,831 sq mi (35,820 km^{2})
- Population: Total; Catholics: (as of 2023); ▲701,120; ▲85,380 (▼12.2%)
- Parishes: 23 (2023)

Information
- Denomination: Catholic
- Sui iuris church: Latin Church
- Rite: Roman Rite
- Established: 10 May 1887; 139 years ago
- Cathedral: Cathedral of the Sacred Heart of Jesus and of Saint Mary His Mother
- Patron saint: Sacred Heart and Our Lady
- Secular priests: 48 (diocesan) (2023); 52 (religious)

Current leadership
- Pope: Leo XIV
- Metropolitan Archbishop: Paul Martin
- Bishops emeritus: John Dew

Website
- cadw.nz

The Archdiocese of Wellington is the Latin Catholic metropolitan archdiocese of New Zealand. Catholics number about 85,380 (2023). Parishes number 23 and the archdiocese extends over central New Zealand from Levin and Masterton in the north to Kaikoura and Westport in the south.

The suffragan sees are:

- Auckland
- Christchurch
- Dunedin
- Hamilton
- Palmerston North

== History ==
=== Pioneers ===
The Catholic faith of the new immigrants to Wellington was initially sustained through the efforts of John Fitzgerald who arrived on 31 January 1840. He led the Sunday prayers and organised Christian Doctrine classes. The first resident priest was the Capuchin Father Jeremiah O’Riley who arrived as chaplain to Hon Henry William Petre, a director of the New Zealand Company and one of the founders of Wellington. O'Riley arrived in January 1843 and within a year the first, small Catholic church was built and dedicated to the Nativity. Meanwhile, the Auckland-based French Marists ministered extensively throughout the country and Fr J.B. Compte SM established a permanent mission at Ōtaki in 1844.

=== Marists ===
In June 1848, Pope Pius IX divided New Zealand into two dioceses, Auckland and Wellington which consisted of the lower half of the North Island and the whole of the South Island. Bishop Philippe Viard, who arrived in Wellington on the barque "Clara" on 1 May 1850, was the first bishop. With him were five Marist priests, ten lay brothers, two lay male teachers, three Māori and four young women, the "Sisters of Mary" who commenced teaching at what became St Mary's College and Sacred Heart Cathedral School.

=== Establishment ===
Viard bought and was given land in Thorndon on which his residence, St Mary's Convent and St Mary's Cathedral were built. Garin and Clause went to Nelson to establish the church there. Fr Lampila and two others established a mission in Hawkes Bay. Forest and Huntley worked in the Hutt Valley. Petitjean and Seon travelled extensively throughout the South Island. By 1852 a parish had been established in Whanganui and the Māori mission on the Whanganui River had a resident priest. For ten years, however, Viard received no reinforcements and illness took a toll on his personnel. In March 1860 the Sisters of Mercy arrived from Auckland to take over the works of the four Sisters of Mary.

=== Expansion ===
In 1859 three more Marist priests arrived and pastors could be provided to New Plymouth, Christchurch and Dunedin. The discovery of gold in 1857 and after meant a rapid expansion of the Church on the West Coast, and Dunedin became a separate diocese in 1869. Irish priests arrived and followed their compatriots to the diggings. The Sisters of the Missions also arrived to establish schools in Napier (Sacred Heart College Napier and St Joseph's Māori Girls' College) and in Christchurch and Nelson.

=== Archdiocese ===
Viard died on 2 June 1872 and was succeeded by Francis Redwood, who remained ordinary of the diocese for 61 years. The diocese was elevated to an archdiocese on 10 May 1887 and Christchurch became a separate diocese. Thomas O’Shea became his coadjutor bishop in 1913 and remained so for 22 years. Redwood died in 1935 and was succeeded by O’Shea whose archiepiscopate lasted for 12 years. Peter McKeefry was appointed coadjutor archbishop in 1947 and succeeded on the death of O’Shea in 1954. McKeefry was appointed a cardinal in 1969 and was assisted by Owen Snedden who was auxiliary bishop from 1962.

=== Cardinals ===
During McKeefry's episcopate the Catholic population of Wellington more than doubled and 39 new parishes were established. New orders arrived such as the Cistercians in Hawkes Bay. McKeefry, who became New Zealand's first cardinal in 1969, was succeeded in 1973 by Reginald Delargey who in turn was succeeded, on his death in 1979, by Thomas Williams, who became a cardinal in 1983. In 1980 the archdiocese was split with the creation of the Palmerston North diocese. Williams retired in March 2005 and John Dew was appointed as his replacement. He was made a cardinal in 2015.

=== Present ===
In 2019, Dew, addressing the state of the church's buildings and the future of their congregations, stated that soaring insurance costs and a dwindling number of priests meant that the resources of the archdiocese would have to be more efficiently used. He said that fewer resources would be poured into retaining buildings and more attention and energy focused on serving the poor, as required by Pope Francis and the synod. He said that earthquake resilience issues meant that the archdiocese was liable for unsustainable insurance costs and the strengthening of buildings with unacceptable New Building Standard ratings. Already four churches and Sacred Heart Cathedral had been closed because of this. He also stated that some parishes would need to amalgamate to cope with the lack of clergy. He said that the reduced number of priests, which was accelerating each year, meant that in most parishes there was a single priest – often elderly – expected to minister in more than one church. Availability and ability of priests were highly significant factors governing decisions for the future that could not be delayed. Between 2013 and 2017 the archdiocese carried out a parish amalgamation process, which led to the reduction in parishes from 47 to 22, and many of the new parishes had too many churches, presbyteries, and other buildings.

== Ordinaries ==
Philippe Viard was vicar apostolic of the Diocese of Wellington from 1848 until 1860 when he became the Bishop of Wellington. Francis Redwood was bishop of that diocese until 1887 when he became archbishop of the Archdiocese of Wellington (created in that year) and Metropolitan of New Zealand. All incumbents since then carry those latter two titles.

Tenure	Incumbent	Life
1848–1860	Philippe Viard Vicar Apostolic; see below	(1809–1872)
1860–1872	Philippe Viard Bishop of Wellington; see above
1874–1887	Francis Redwood Bishop of Wellington; see below	(1839–1935)
1887–1935	Francis Redwood Archbishop of Wellington; see above
1935–1954	Thomas O'Shea	(1870–1954)
1954–1973	Peter McKeefry, cardinal	(1899–1973)
1974–1979	Reginald Delargey, cardinal	(1914–1979)
1979–2005	Thomas Williams, cardinal	(1930–2023)
2005–2023	John Dew, cardinal	(b. 1948)
2023–present	Paul Martin	(b. 1967)

== Current Bishops ==
- Archbishop Paul Martin, Archbishop of Wellington
- Cardinal John Dew, Emeritus Archbishop of Wellington

== Other bishops ==
=== Coadjutor archbishops ===
- Thomas O'Shea (1913–1935)
- Peter McKeefry (1947–1954)
- John Dew (2004–2005)
- Paul Martin (2021–2023)

=== Auxiliary bishops ===
- Owen Snedden (1962–1981)
- John Dew (1995–2004)

=== Other priests of the diocese who became bishops ===
- John Kavanagh, appointed Auxiliary Bishop of Dunedin in 1949
- Edward Russell Gaines, appointed Auxiliary Bishop of Auckland in 1976
- Peter James Cullinane, appointed Bishop of Palmerston North in 1980
- Patrick Edward O'Connor, appointed superior of Tokelau, Pacific (Oceania) in 1992; not consecrated bishop
- Owen Dolan (priest, 1954–1980), appointed coadjutor bishop of Palmerston North in 1995

== Secondary schools ==
- Bishop Viard College, Porirua, Wellington
- Chanel College, Masterton
- Garin College, Nelson
- Sacred Heart College, Lower Hutt, Wellington
- St Bernard's College, Lower Hutt, Wellington
- St Catherine's College, Kilbirnie, Wellington
- St Mary's College, Thorndon, Wellington
- St Patrick's College, Kilbirnie, Wellington
- St Patrick's College, Silverstream, Wellington

=== Child sexual abuse cases ===
Documented cases of child sexual abuse by Catholic priests and brothers in the Wellington area include:

- Marist Brother Claudius Pettit (birth name Malcolm Thomas Petit) was convicted of sexual abuse of a boy at a Wellington school in the 1990s.
- In 2018 the Society of Mary said that Francis Durning sexually abused children. Durning taught in Catholic institutions from the 1940s through to the late 1980s, such as St Patrick's College, Silverstream (where he was rector of the school from 1950–1955) and St Patrick's College, Kilbirnie, Wellington.
- Marist Father Alan Woodcock abused children at St Patrick's College in Upper Hutt and Futuna in Wellington. After he was laicized and left New Zealand to live in England, he was extradited back to New Zealand and was convicted in 2004 of 21 sex offences committed between 1978 and 1987. The abuse continued with the knowledge of priests Michael Curtain and Fred Bliss. The Sisters of St Joseph of Nazareth assisted in locating him abroad. In the late 1980s, he took up residence in England, where he was arrested in 2002. Woodcock received a 21 year prison sentence.
- Patrick Bignell, who taught in the Hutt Valley, was convicted of "crimes against boys".

== See also ==
- Catholic Church in New Zealand
- Sacred Heart Cathedral, Wellington
- St Gerard's Church and Monastery
- St Mary's Cathedral, Wellington
- St Joseph's Church, Mt Victoria
- Suzanne Aubert
- Francis Douglas (priest)
- Holy Name Seminary
- Holy Cross College (New Zealand)
- Southern Star Abbey
- List of Catholic dioceses in New Zealand
