= Philippe Viard =

French priest (1809–1872)

- Archbishop of Wellington
- Church: Catholic Church
- Diocese: Wellington
- Appointed: 3 July 1860
- Installed: 3 July 1860
- Term ended: 2 June 1872
- Predecessor: Position established
- Successor: Francis Redwood

Personal details
- Born: 11 October 1809 Lyon, France
- Died: 2 June 1872 (aged 62)

Philippe Joseph Viard SM (11 October 1809 – 2 June 1872) was a French priest and the first bishop of the Catholic diocese of Wellington, New Zealand.

== Early life ==
Born to Claude and Pierrette Charlotte (née Rolland) Viard in Lyon, he attended the parish school of Saint-Nizier and then entered the minor seminary at Argentière about 1827, proceeding to the major seminary of Saint-Irénée at Lyon in 1831. He was ordained priest in St John's Cathedral, Lyon on 20 December 1834 by Archbishop de Pins. He was a curate in the diocese of Lyon until 1839.

== Marist ==
On 1 January 1839 he joined the recently formed Society of Mary. After a short novitiate Viard was professed on 19 May, leaving the following day with a group of Marists for New Zealand. The missionaries sailed from London on the Australasian Packet on 14 June 1839. They arrived in Sydney on 23 October, and sailed for New Zealand on the Martha, arriving on 8 December. In May 1840 Bishop Pompallier sent Viard to set up a mission station at Tauranga with the help of a Maori catechist, Romano.

== Vicar General in Auckland ==
On 4 June 1841, Pompallier appointed Viard his vicar general and recalled him to Kororareka. Viard accompanied Pompallier on his voyages around New Zealand on the mission schooner Sancta Maria. It was at Akaroa in November that news was received of Fr Peter Chanel's murder on Futuna Island in April.

With Viard, Pompallier set out for Wallis and Futuna islands on his schooner, accompanied by the French corvette L'Allier. Pompallier remained at Wallis while Viard brought Chanel's remains back to the Bay of Islands in February 1842. Viard returned to Wallis in April with provisions and was placed in charge of the Pacific Islands.

== Assistant Bishop in Auckland ==
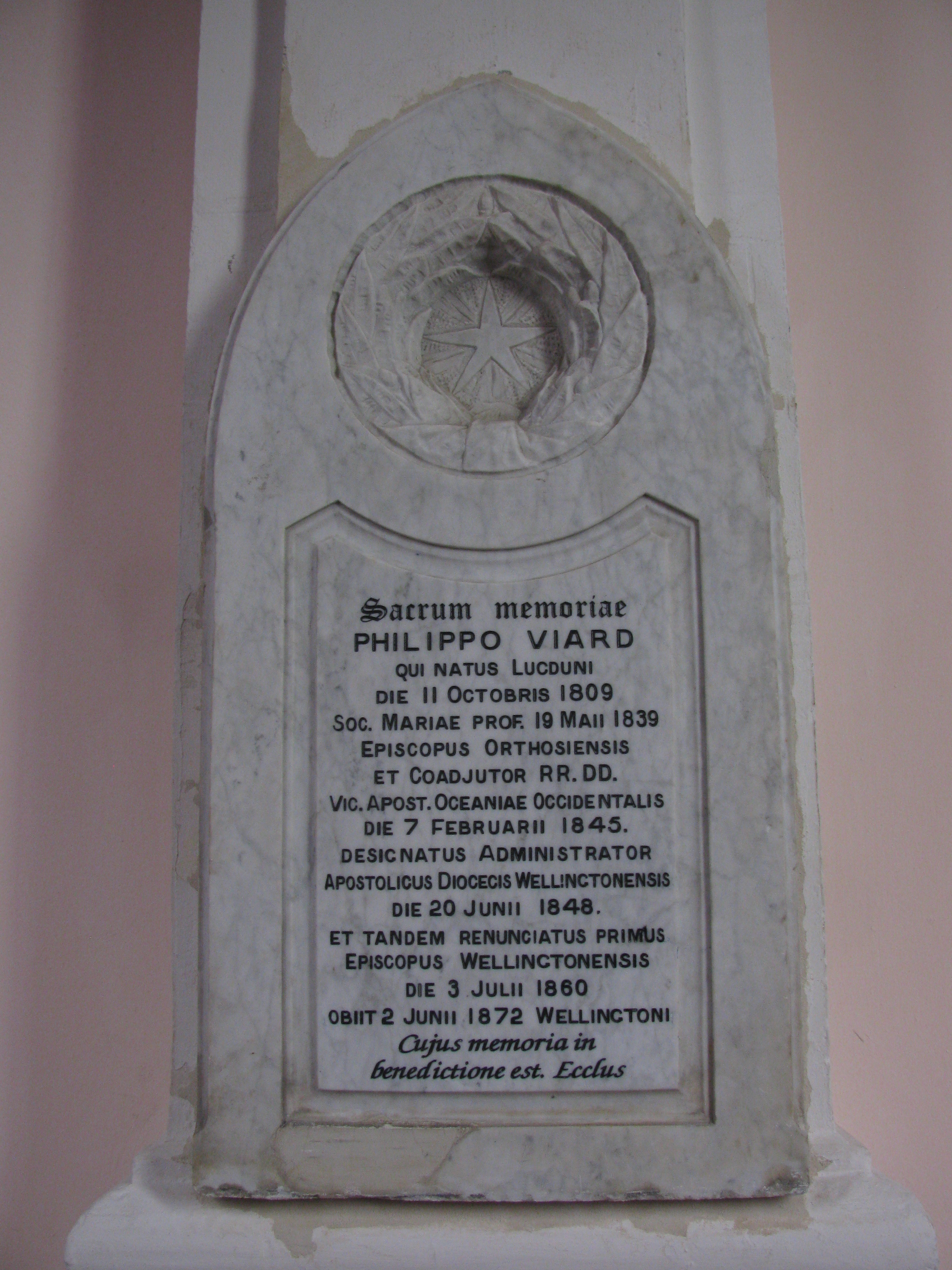
Latin memorial tablet for Bishop Viard in Sacred Heart Cathedral, Wellington originally placed at his grave in St Mary's Cathedral. Translation:Sacred to the Memory Philippe Viard Born Lyons 11 October 1809 Professed Society of Mary 19 May 1839 Consecrated Bishopof Orthosia & Coadjutor to the Vicar Apostolic Western Oceania 7 February 1845 Appointed Apostolic Administrator Diocese of Wellington 20 June 1848 Proclaimed First Bishop of Wellington 3 June 1860 Died Wellington 2 June 1872 His name is held in Benediction

Viard was summoned back to New Zealand by Pompallier in September 1845 learning by letter that he had been appointed by Rome Bishop in partibus of Orthosia and coadjutor to Pompallier. Arriving at Sydney en route for the Bay of Islands in October, Viard was consecrated bishop by Archbishop Polding on 4 January 1846. A few months later Pompallier travelled to Rome and Viard was left in charge. On 23 May 1847, Viard ordained Jean-Georges Collomb (SM; born 1816 – died 1848) in Kororoareka on Pentecost Sunday. Collomb was named Vicar Apostolic of the newly created vicariate of Melanesia and Micronesia. Collomb died of fever in 1848 on Rooke Island, Papua New Guinea.

On 15 February 1849, Viard received news from Rome that two dioceses had been created in New Zealand. Pompallier was to retain control of the northern diocese centred on Auckland. Viard was to be Vicar Apostolic of the Southern diocese, headquartered in Wellington, which was apparently Rome's attempt to solve the Pompallier—Marist quarrels by sending the Marists south of Taupo with Viard as their leader. He set sail from Auckland in April 1850 aboard the Clara and arrived on 2 May 1850.

== Bishop of Wellington ==
Viard purchased land in Thorndon and the Hutt Valley. In Thorndon (now Hill Street) the Marist lay brothers began building a clergy house and a convent for the sisters. A foundation stone was laid for St Mary's Cathedral. Viard had a vast diocese and few clergy but was able to open missions or parishes in the Hutt Valley, Hawke's Bay and Nelson. The Akaroa mission was reopened for a time but troubles with the Canterbury Association caused its priests to leave. In 1852 the Wanganui parish and mission were opened and after that there was virtually no Marist help given to Viard until 1859.

In 1860 Viard was appointed first bishop of Wellington. Practical questions continued to tax him during the next decade. In 1861, noting the diminishing number of sisters in the Wellington convent, he invited Auckland Sisters of Mercy to come to Wellington. He also brought French sisters from the Institute of Our Lady of the Missions to Napier, Christchurch and Nelson. With the arrival of new groups of Marists he was able to establish priests in New Plymouth and Christchurch in 1860, and in Marlborough in 1864. During these years he remained keenly disappointed that he did not have the resources to support adequately the Māori missions. The Taranaki wars also interfered for a time with the expansion of Māori work.

A new phase of activity was precipitated by the gold rushes in Otago and Westland. From 1861 Viard kept a Marist at Dunedin permanently, and during the 1860s was able to send more priests to Invercargill and the Otago diggings. The miners of the Otago and West Coast diggings helped Viard build up his depleted finances. He visited Otago and Canterbury in 1864 and the northern part of the South Island and Westland in 1866.

In Westland, Irish priests followed the thousands of Irish miners and their families to the diggings, and parishes were established at Greymouth, Hokitika, Kumara, Ngahere, Charleston, Ross, Westport and Reefton. Viard was greatly embarrassed when it was revealed that several Irish priests were active Fenian supporters, and he spoke out against their activities in 1868.

== Final years and death ==
After his appointment as Bishop of Wellington, several requests had been made for Viard to visit Rome. On 8 July 1868, he left for Europe. From 1869 to 1870 he attended the First Vatican Council in Rome, presided over by Pope Pius IX. In his absence, Dunedin (Otago and Southland) was created as a separate diocese under Bishop Patrick Moran. The affection Wellington people had for Viard was evidenced by the crowd which welcomed him back to New Zealand on 19 March 1871. However, it was evident that his health had suffered during his travels. By 1872 it was evident death was near.

He died on 2 June 1872, aged 62, and was buried in St Mary's Cathedral and his grave is now in Sacred Heart Cathedral. He was succeeded by Francis Redwood.

Catholic Church titles
| Preceded by – | Coadjutor Vicar Apostolic of New Zealand; 1845–1848 | Succeeded by – |
| Preceded by New title | Apostolic Administrator of Wellington; 1848–1860 | Succeeded by New title |
| Preceded by New title | Bishop of Wellington; 1860–1872 | Succeeded by Francis Redwood |

== Legacy ==
Bishop Viard College in Porirua to the north of Wellington is named after him.

== Sources ==
- Lillian G. Keys, Philip Viard, Bishop of Wellington, Pegasus Press, Christchurch, 1968.
- Ernest Richard Simmons, Brief history of the Catholic Church in New Zealand, Catholic Publications Centre, Auckland, 1978.
- Michael King, God's farthest outpost: a history of Catholics in New Zealand, Viking, Auckland, 1997.
- Michael O'Meeghan S.M., Steadfast in hope : the story of the Catholic Archdiocese of Wellington 1850–2000, Dunmore Press, Palmerston North, 2003.
- Broadbent, John V. "Viard, Philippe Joseph, 1809 – 1872: Priest, missionary, bishop". Dictionary of New Zealand Biography. Ministry for Culture and Heritage.
