= List of buildings by Francis Petre =

New Zealand-born architect

Francis Petre (27 August 1847 – 10 December 1918) was a New Zealand-born architect based in Dunedin. He was an exponent of the Gothic revival style, one of its best practitioners in New Zealand. He followed the Roman Church's initiative to build Catholic places of worship in Anglo-Saxon countries in Romance forms of architecture. The following is a list of buildings he designed, by date of construction.

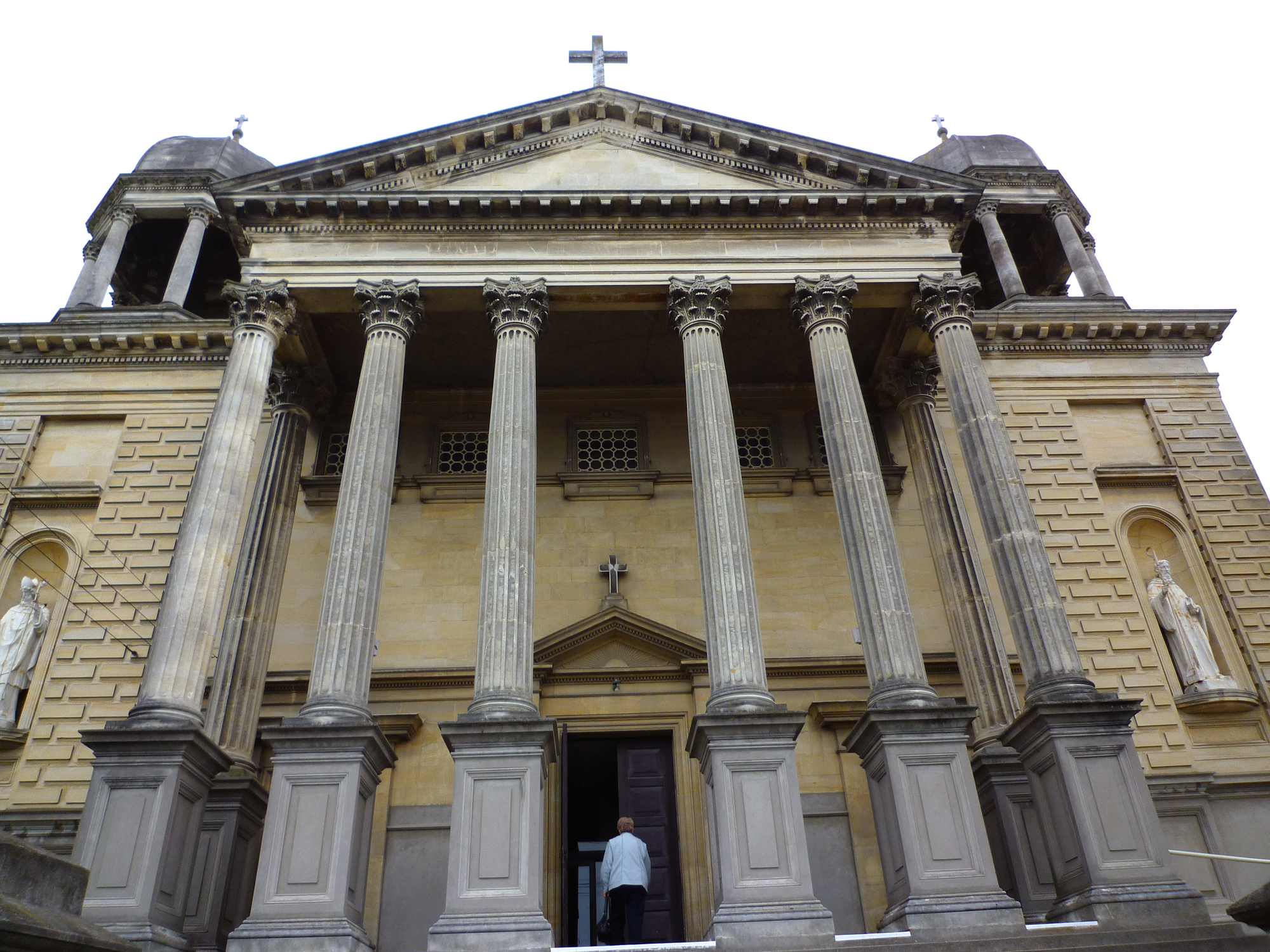
St. Patrick's Basilica, Oamaru, exterior

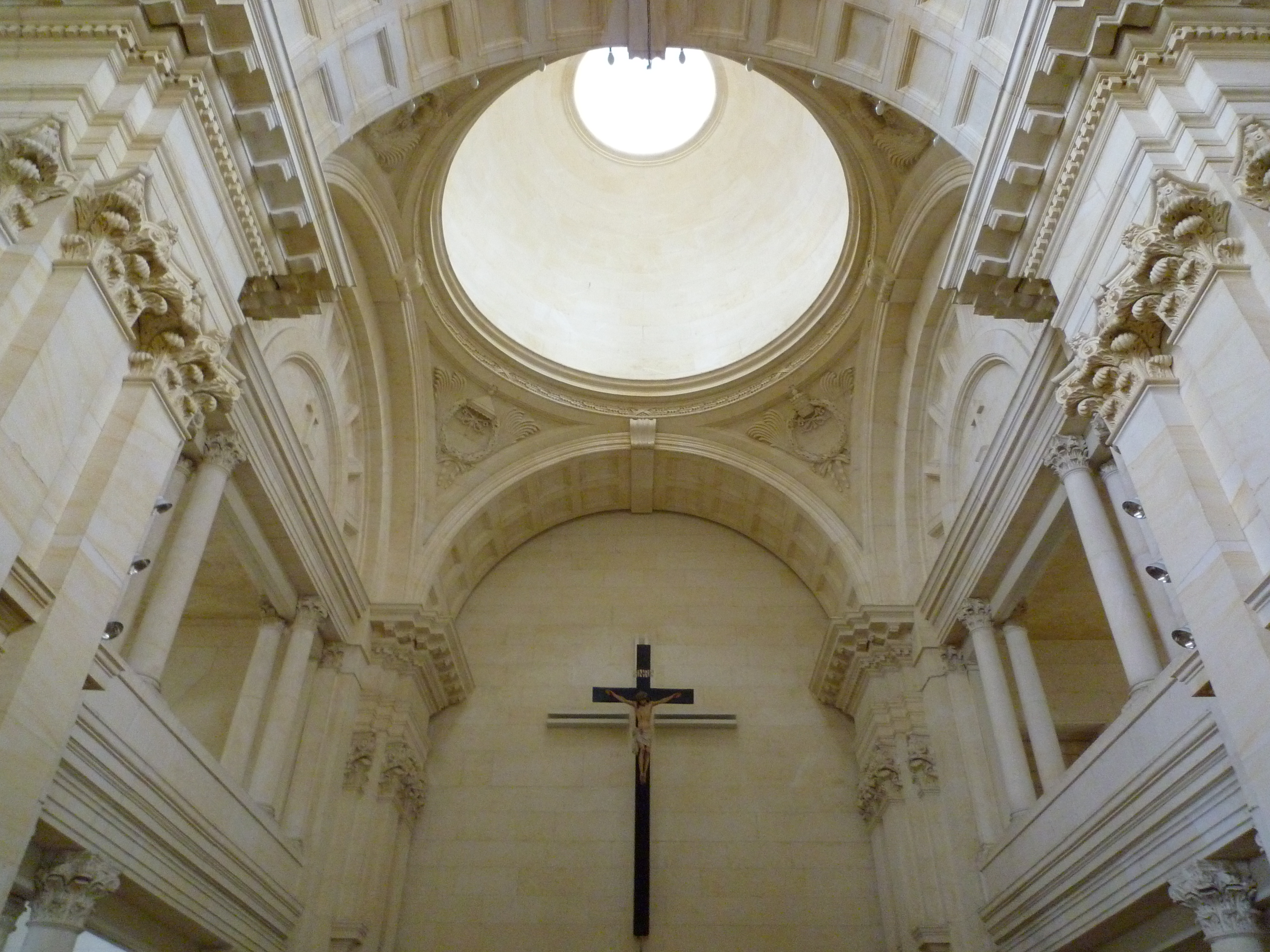
St. Patrick's Basilica, Oamaru, interior

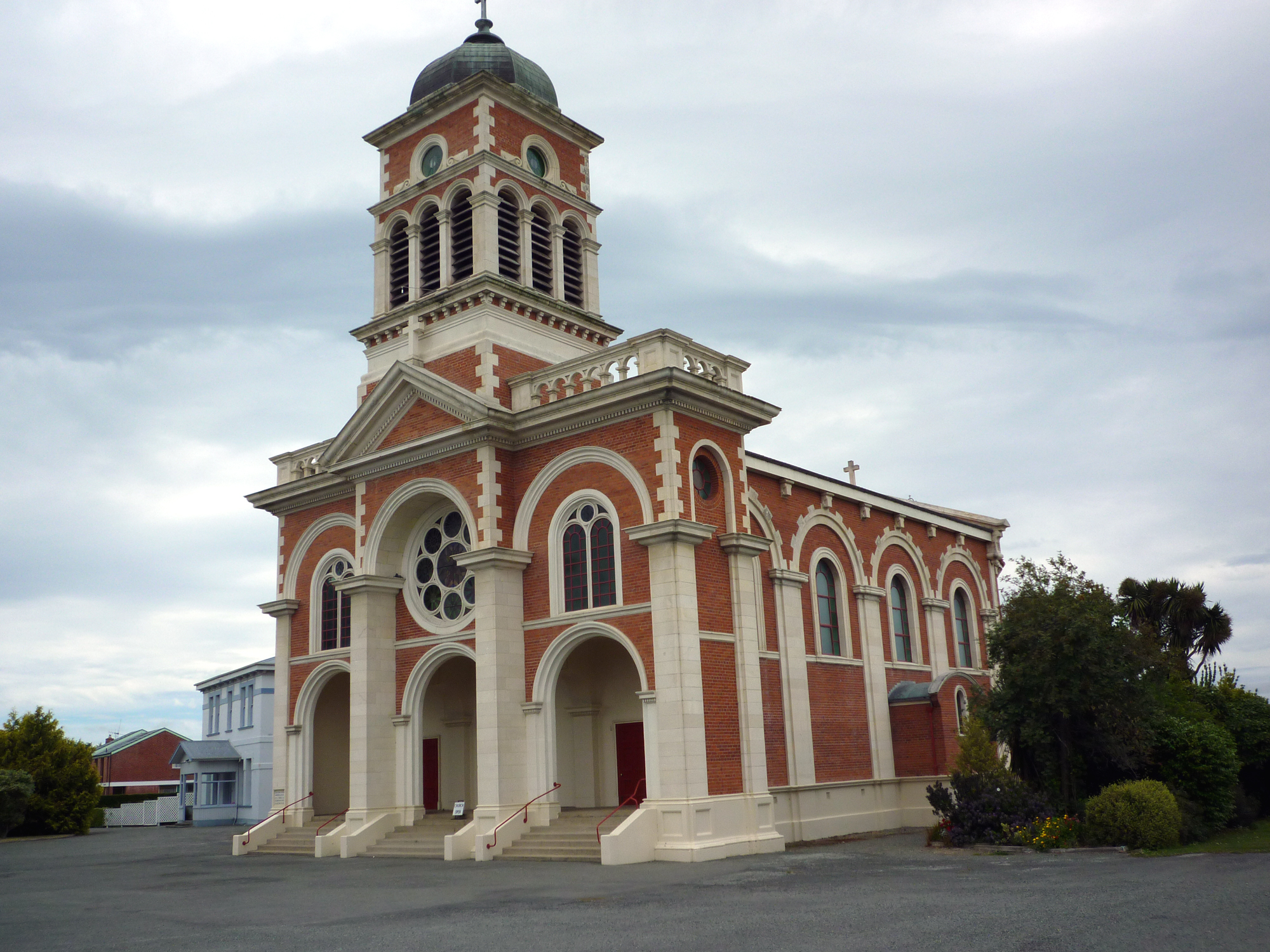
St.Patrick's Church, Waimate, exterior

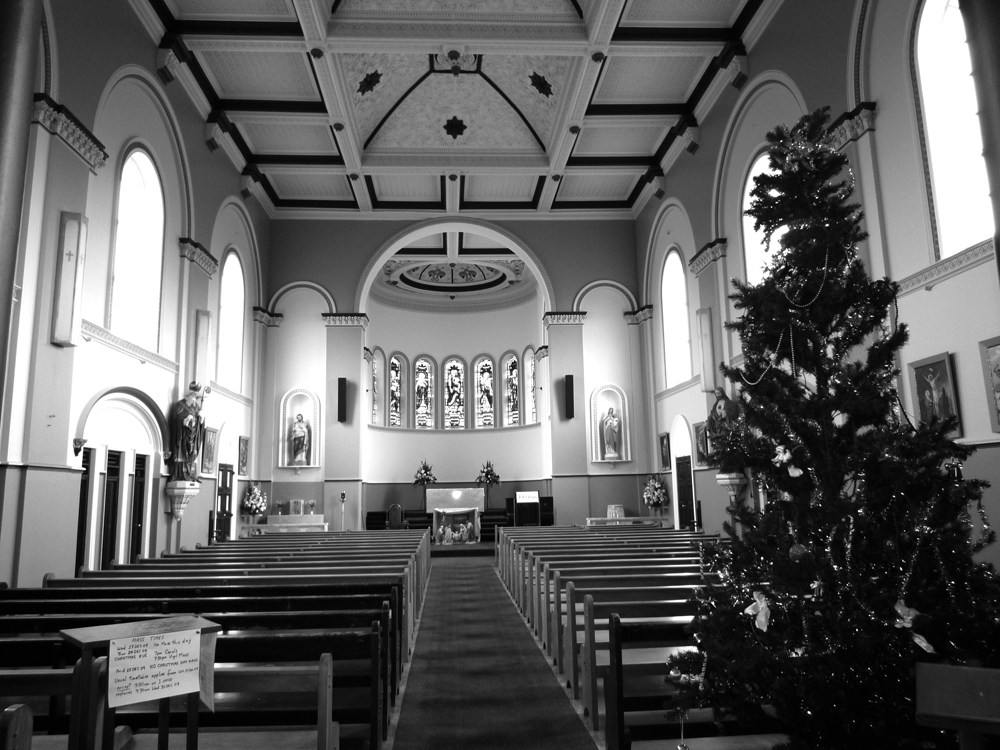
St.Patrick's Church, Waimate, interior

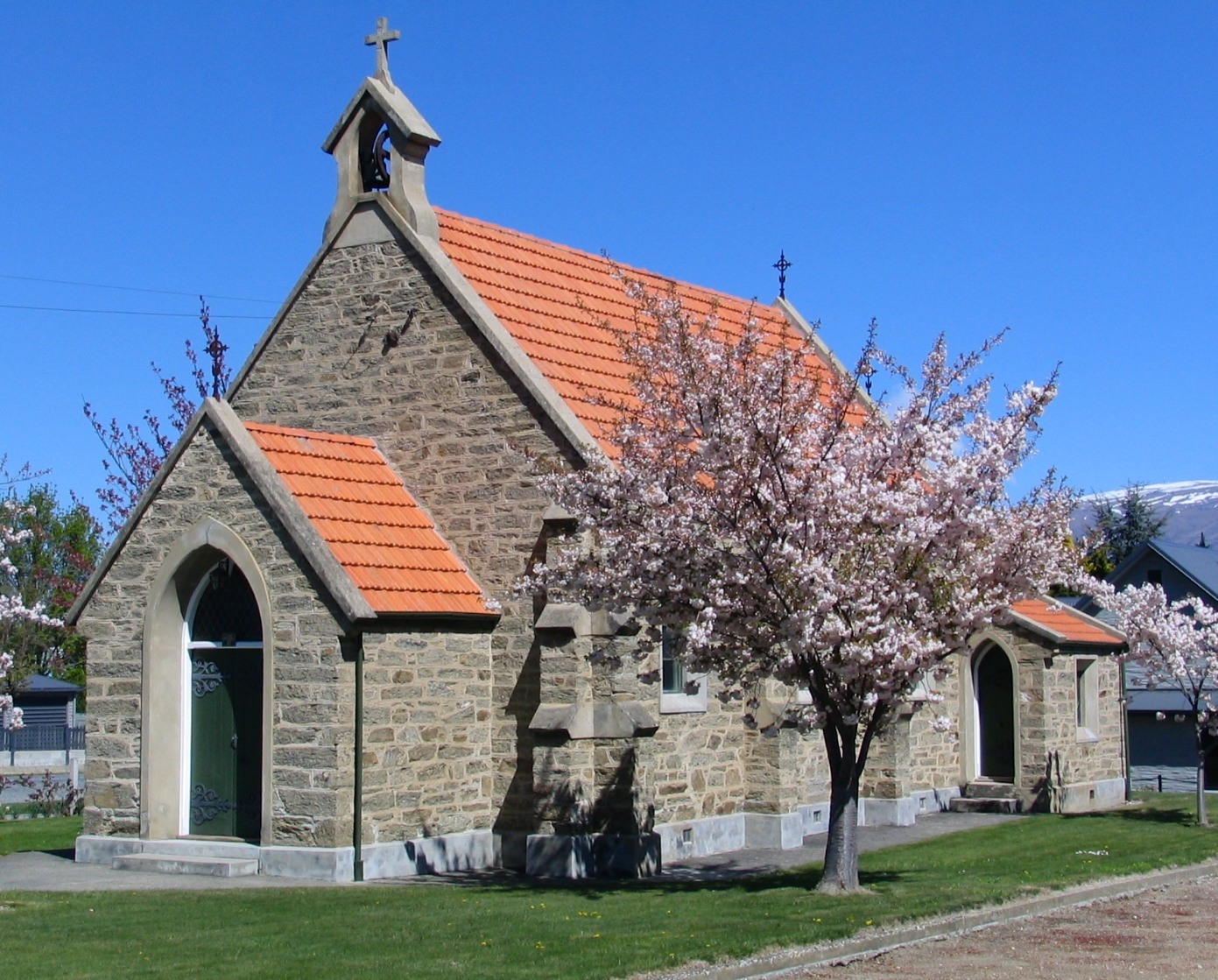
St Dunstan's Church (Catholic) Clyde, Otago

- 1875. Woodside mansion (Castlamore), Dunedin, for Judge Chapman. Style: Gothic revival.
- 1876. Cargill's Castle, Dunedin, for E. B. Cargill. Style: mixed Italianate, Castelated and Gothic.
- 1877. St. Dominic's Priory, and chapel, Dunedin. Style: Gothic revival - this and the two above in poured concrete.
- 1877. Church of St Mary, Star of the Sea, Port Chalmers, near Dunedin. Opened 12 May 1878 Re-opened June 1898. Also adjoining presbytery.
- 1877. St Michael the Archangel Church, Palmerston, Otago. Since replaced.
- 1877 St Leonard’s Church (dedication), at St Leonards, Otago. No longer exists
- 1878 St. Patrick's School Chapel, South Dunedin. Opened 21 August 1878
- 1878–1886. St. Joseph's Cathedral, Dunedin. Style: Gothic Revival. Foundation Stone laid 26 January 1879
- 1879 Manor Terrace, Manor Place, Dunedin.
- 1880. St Peter’s, Ophir, Otago. Opened Sunday 5 September 1880 Deconsecrated c.1929 and sold. Now private residence.
- 1881–1882. Guardian Royal Exchange Assurance Building, Dunedin. Style: Palladian.
- 1881. Sacred Heart Convent, Christchurch. Later the Christchurch Music Centre. Demolished after 2010/11 earthquakes.
- 1882. Catholic Church of The Holy Name of Jesus, Ashburton. Opened 10 December 1882 (Since demolished)
- 1882. Dominican Convent School Chapel (St Joseph’s), Invercargill.
- 1882. Blessed Sacrament Church, Gore. Opened 25 October 1914; demolished 1980s.
- 1883. Llanmaes mansion, Christchurch. Style: English cottage. Now Dux de Lux cafe.
- 1883. St Kevin’s Catholic Church, Wyndham, Southland. Foundation Stone laid 8 July 1883 Opened 30 March 1884 Since Replaced.
- 1884. Chapel of St. Peter's, Catholic, Wreys Bush Southland, New Zealand. Opened 24 February 1884. (Since Demolished)
- 1884. Fletcher Humphreys and Co building, Christchurch. (Since demolished)
- 1884. Australian Mutual Provident Society building, Christchurch. (Since demolished)
- 1884. Church of St Thomas, Winton, Southland. Since replaced.
- c.1885. St Joseph’s Catholic Church, Hakataramea, Canterbury. Occasionally referred to as the Sacred Heart Church. Since demolished.
- c.1885. Phoenix House, Dunedin (now Airport House).
- c.1885. Pinner House, Dunedin. Style: English cottage.
- 1885. Presbytery at Milton, Otago.
- c.1886. The Magdalen Asylum, Christchurch.
- 1887. Otago Harbour Board Building, Dunedin
- 1888. St. Patrick's Catholic Church, Greymouth. Foundation Stone laid 17 April 1887, Opened 20 May 1888 (Since demolished)
- 1889. St Canice Catholic Church, Westport. Since replaced with a modern building
- 1892. St Patrick’s Church, Hawea Flat, Otago, and associated hall. Church subsequently decommissioned and sold. Private residence, and still standing late 2012. Hall demolished.
- 1892. Sacred Heart Church, North East Valley, Dunedin. Appears to be constructed of poured concrete
- 1892. St. Patrick's Church, Lawrence, Otago
- 1892. St. Mary's Roman Catholic Church, Milton. Sometimes referred to as the Church of the Immaculate Conception
- 1894. Catholic Church of St Mary, Star of the Sea, Hampden, Otago
- 1894. The Sacred Heart Church, Hyde, Otago
- 1895. Re-opening of St Peter’s Church, Wreys Bush, Southland
- 1895. St Joseph’s Church, Morven, Canterbury. Deconsecrated and closed 1970s. Still standing in 2011 in a complete state. Private use
- c. 1896. St Virgilius, church extensions, Balclutha, Otago. Since replaced and renamed
- 1896. Memorial Chapel to late Bishop Moran, Dunedin Southern Cemetery
- 1898. St Joseph’s Catholic Church at Queenstown
- 1898. St Patrick's Basilica, South Dunedin. First opened 1894 in an unfinished state
- c. 1898 Convent and Orphanage associated with St Patrick’s, South Dunedin. Convent chapel named as St Vincent de Paul
- 1898. Re-opening of St John the Baptist Church, Alexandra. First opened 18??. Since replaced
- 1899. St Patrick's Hall, South Dunedin. Near the Basilica
- 1899. St Joseph's Hall, Dunedin. Opposite St Joseph’s Cathedral
- 1900. Dominican Convent, Oamaru, and chapel. Almost next door to the Basilica
- 1900. Chapel of Holy Cross College, Mosgiel, Mosgiel, also Mercy Convent
- 1901. St Paul the Apostle Church, Middlemarch, Otago
- 1901 Convent, Milton, Otago
- 1901. Sacred Heart Basilica (now Cathedral of the Sacred Heart), Wellington. Style: Palladian
- 1902. Convent of Mercy, South Dunedin
- c.1902. St Mary’s Church, Riversdale, Southland
- 1903. St Thomas the Apostle Church, Garston, Southland
- 1903. St Dunstan’s Catholic Church, Clyde, Otago
- 1904–05. Cathedral of the Blessed Sacrament, Christchurch. Style: Italian Renaissance. Severely damaged in 2010–11 earthquakes
- 1905. St. Mary's Basilica, Invercargill
- 1905. St Michael’s Church, Lumsden, Southland
- 1906. Sacred Heart Church, Naseby, Otago. Deconsecrated and sold 2009
- 1907. Mary Immaculate Catholic Church at Flint's Bush, (a.k.a. Thornbury) Riverton, Southland
- 1909. St Patrick's Basilica, Waimate, Canterbury. Style: Romanesque with Italianate cupola and campanile
- 1909. Church of the Irish Martyrs, Cromwell, Otago
- 1909. Home of the Little Sisters of the Poor, Dunedin
- 1910. Basilica of the Sacred Heart, Timaru (Timaru Basilica). Style: Byzantine. Foundation stone laid 6 February 1910, opened 1 October 1911 and the copy of its transepts, sanctuary and sacristies opened in Paddington, Sydney in 1918).
- c. 1910. Council Chambers, Waimate
- 1916. St Patrick's Dominican College, Teschemakers, near Oamaru. Boarding Wing and Chapel of the Holy Rosary
- 1918. (building commenced 1893) St Patrick's Basilica, Oamaru. Style: mixed Palladian and Renaissance. Also the Presbytery next door
- Undated. Our Lady of Mount Carmel Church, Windsor, Otago
- Undated. St Bridget Church extensions, Waitahuna, Otago
- Undated. Home for the Aged, Andersons Bay, Dunedin
- Undated. Benevolent Institution. Caversham, Dunedin
- Undated. Golf Club Rooms, St Clair, Dunedin
