= List of basilicas in New Zealand =

The following is a list of basilicas in New Zealand. This list is by architectural style of building rather than by any special criteria granted by the Pope. New Zealand has no minor basilicas declared by the Vatican.

== List by date of completion ==
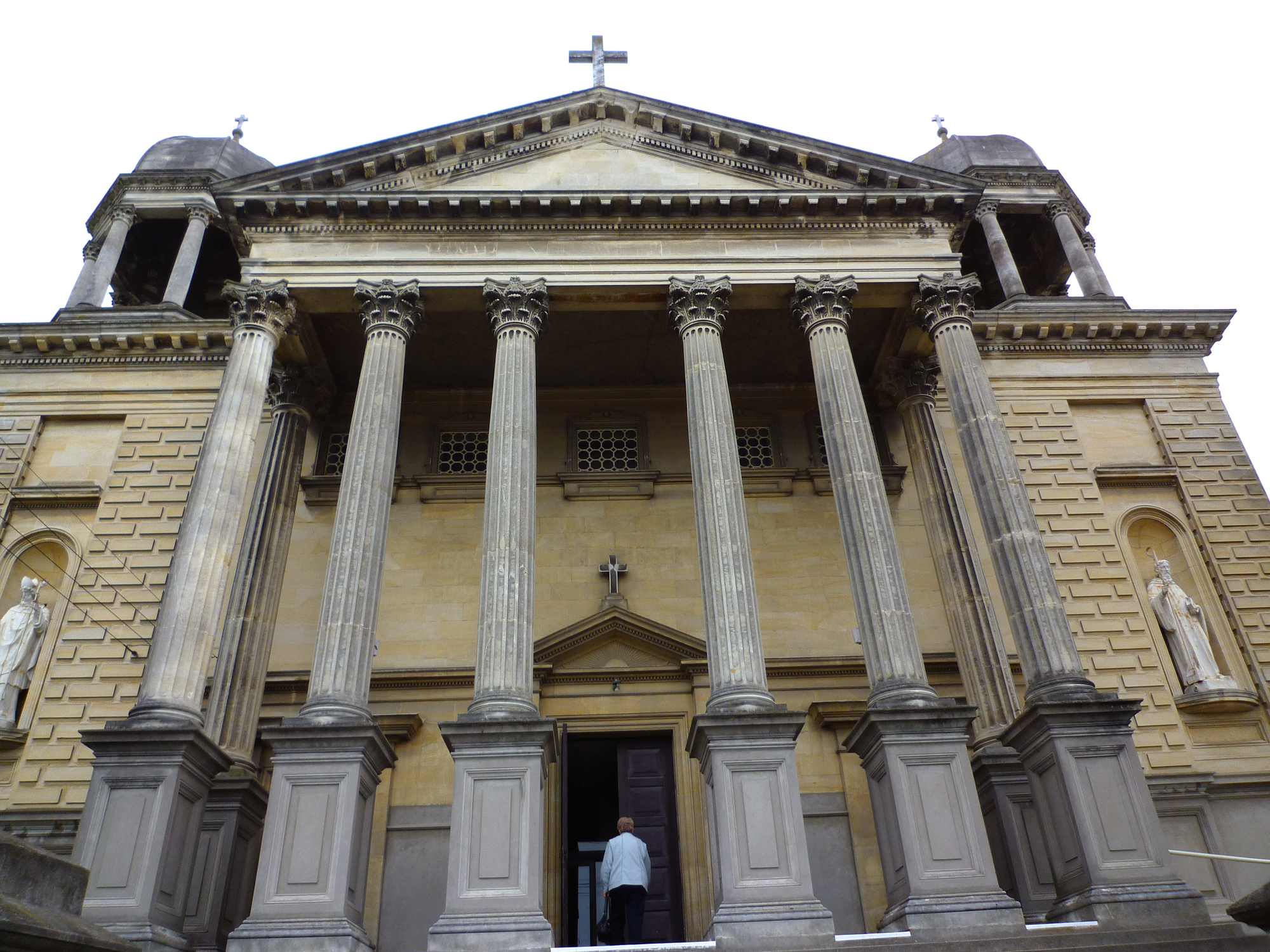
St Patrick's Church or Oamaru Basilica, as it is popularly known because of its style of architecture

Basilica	City	Year
Auckland Baptist Tabernacle	Auckland	1885
Sacred Heart Cathedral	Wellington	1901
St Patrick's Basilica	Oamaru	1893–1903
St Patrick's Basilica	South Dunedin	1894
Cathedral of the Blessed Sacrament (Christchurch Basilica)	Christchurch	1907
St Mary's Basilica	Invercargill	1905
Basilica of the Sacred Heart (Timaru Basilica)	Timaru	1910
St Patrick's Basilica	Waimate	1909
