= St Patrick's Basilica =

St Patrick's Basilica may refer to:

- St Patrick's Basilica, Fremantle, Western Australia
- St. Patrick's Basilica, Montreal, Quebec, Canada
- St Patrick's Basilica, Oamaru, North Otago, New Zealand
- St Patrick's Basilica (Ottawa), Ontario, Canada
- St Patrick's Basilica, South Dunedin, Otago, New Zealand
- St Patrick's Basilica, Waimate, Canterbury, New Zealand

== See also ==
- St. Patrick's Cathedral (disambiguation)
