= St Francis of Assisi Catholic Church, Paddington =

Roman Catholic community in Australia

St Francis of Assisi Church
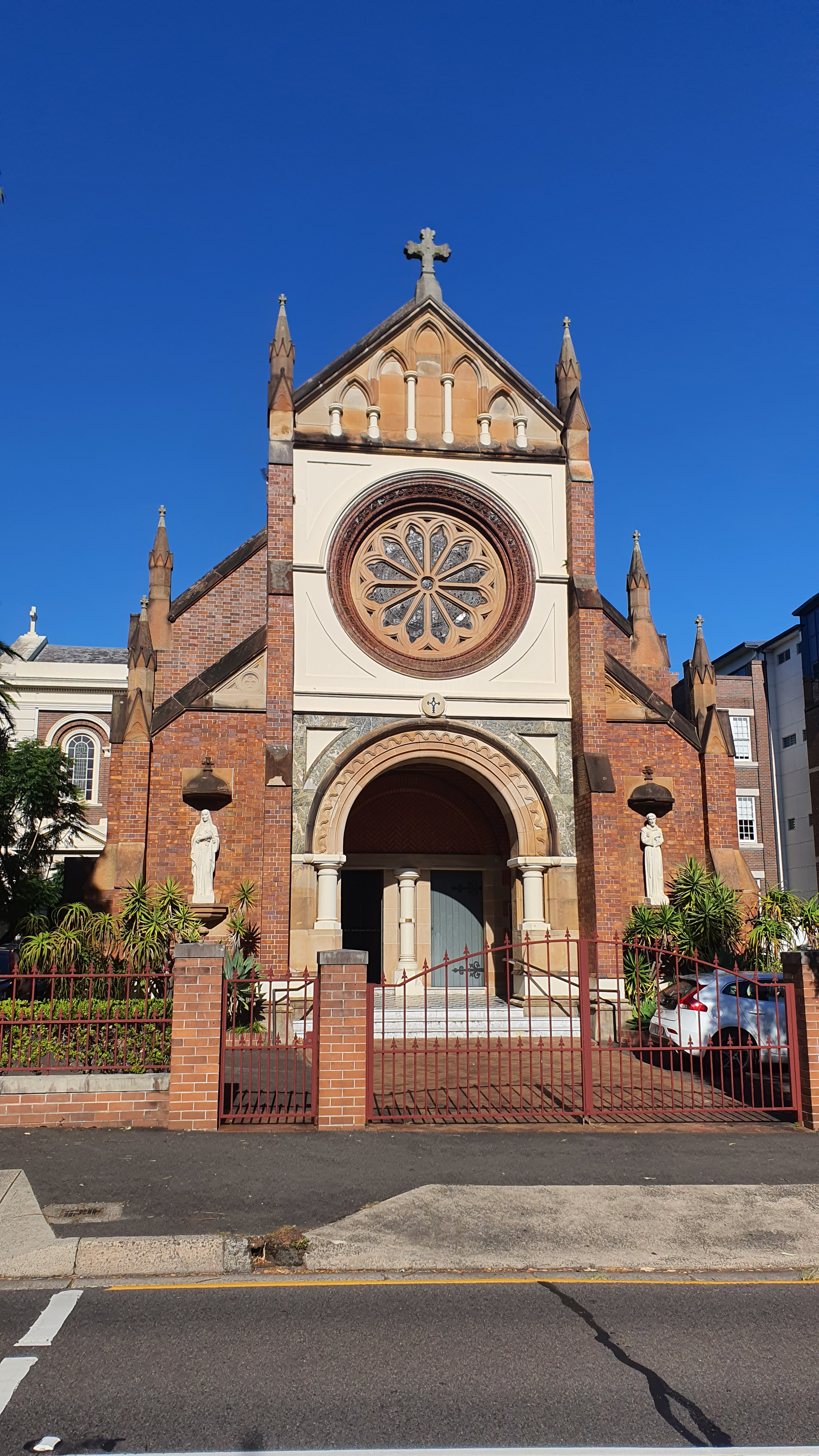
- St Francis of Assisi Church in 2023
- St Francis of Assisi Church
- Address: 463 Oxford Street, Paddington, City of Sydney, New South Wales
- Country: Australia
- Denomination: Roman Catholic
- Religious institute: Franciscans
- Website: stfrancis-stjoseph.com

History
- Status: Church
- Founded: 23 March 1889
- Founder: Cardinal Francis Moran
- Dedication: Saint Francis of Assisi

Architecture
- Functional status: Completed
- Architects: John Barlow; Bart Moriarty
- Architectural type: Church
- Style: Italian or Tuscan Gothic Revival
- Years built: 1889 – 1918
- Construction cost: A£10,000

Administration
- Archdiocese: Sydney
- Parish: St Francis, Paddington and St Joseph, Edgecliff

Clergy
- Priest: Fr Anthoni Selvaraj OFM

St Francis of Assisi Church is a Roman Catholic church located on Oxford Street, Paddington, City of Sydney, New South Wales, Australia.

== History ==
The foundations stone was blessed and laid on 23 March 1889, a ceremony attended by about 1,000 people. Cardinal Francis Moran officially opened the new church on Sunday 22 June 1890, although only the nave had been completed.

The new church, described as Italian or Tuscan Gothic, had an impressive facade facing Oxford Street. Coloured marble was incorporated into the basic sandstone and red tuck-pointed brick structure, and Venetian glass mosaics filled the spandrels around the rose window. The mosaics depicted symbols of the four Evangelists and the coat of arms of the Franciscan Order, according to an article in The Builders and Contractors News of 28 June 1890. Unfortunately, all of the mosaics have long disappeared, victims of time and pollution.

The Freeman's Journal said that "When completed with transepts and sanctuary the church will be one of the largest in Sydney". But the 1890 church was never to be completed. In its incomplete state it soon became over-crowded, despite the celebration of five Masses each Sunday. (Canon law at the time prohibited the celebration of Mass after midday.)

Archbishop Kelly, therefore decided in 1915 that the church should be completed, despite wartime conditions. It was obvious, though, that even if the church were to be completed according to Barlow's plans it would still be too small for Paddington's Catholic population.

A new church was therefore commissioned, designed by Bart Moriarty, but it was to be constructed in two phases. Phase 1 included the sanctuary, sacristies and transepts. Phase 2 would have required the demolition of the 1890 church to make way for the far grander nave of Moriarty's design. The foundation stone was laid on the last Sunday of July 1917.

=== The new church building ===
The cost of completing the building immediately was prohibitive and it was decided to make use of the existing portion of the 1890 church as the temporary nave of the new church. The new building (the sanctuary, transepts and sacristies) was blessed and opened on Sunday, 16 June 1918. Phase Two would commence once the parish had paid off the A£10,000 that Phase 1 had cost. However, Phase 2 never eventuated.

The present church consists of the nave of the 1890 church designed by John Barlow, and the transepts, sanctuary and sacristies of the 1918 church ostensibly designed by Bart Moriarty.

However, it is now clear that Moriarty simply replicated the Sacred Heart Basilica in Timaru, New Zealand, which was designed by the noted Dunedin architect, Francis Petre, and, the construction of which, Bart Moriarty had supervised.

=== The renovation of the church post Vatican II ===
Following the Second Vatican Council a number of changes were made to facilitate the celebration of the newly revised liturgy. In the mid-1970s a square timber platform was built in the crossing, in front of the old sanctuary, allowing seating in the two side chapels to be turned to face the altar platform. This created a closer contact between the celebrant and congregation during liturgical celebrations, but it also split the congregation into three blocks. Aesthetically, the square was at odds with the round arches, the dome and semi-circular apse. The sanctuary area as you see it today is the result of renovations initiated by Fr Nick Lucas in consultation with architect John O'Brien. The renovations were completed early in 1990. The semi-circular terrazzo extension to the original sanctuary (replacing the timber platform) reflected the shape of the arches overhead.

A new altar and lectern were built out of marble from the original pulpit and harmonised with the old high altar. The church was repainted and a new lighting system installed. The new baptismal font of brass and iron has as its pedestal the old font turned upside down. A new stained glass window depicting the baptism of Christ in the Jordan faces the newly positioned font. The original pews, some made by Christian Brothers in the wood-work room of the old Intermediate Technical School, have been stripped to original timber and re-coated, and many have been altered to create the in-the-round effect. The presidential chair is new, but its design was taken from a 19th-century church furniture catalogue.

Alterations to the sanctuary and pews, the preparation and erection of the marble work, and the installation of new lighting cost approximately $60 000. Painting of the entire building and the carrying out of other much needed structural repairs cost much more, but the cost was spread over several years.
