= John Warner & Sons =

Metalworks in various locations in the UK

John Warner and Sons was a metalworks and bellfoundry based in various locations in the UK, established in 1739 and dissolved in 1949.

== Previous businesses ==
A company was founded by Jacob Warner, a Quaker, in 1739 and originally produced water pumps, fire engines, and beer engines. His sons, John & Tomson Warner, then formed a separate metal working business at a house known as Three Bells and a Star in Wood Street, Cheapside; by 1763 they were casting bells and later moved to Fore Street, Cripplegate. In 1782 the Warner brothers dissolved their partnership, John moved to Fleet Street and Tomson remained in Cripplegate.

== Notable bells ==
Warners had a large output of bells, and Warner bells can be found throughout the world. Some of their notable bells including the clock chime at the Houses of Parliament, were cast at their foundry in Jewin Crescent, Cripplegate. The larger Big Ben was cast at Norton, near Stockton-on-Tees and later had to be re-cast by the Whitechapel Bell Foundry, however the four smaller quarter bells are still the Warner originals. In 1913, Warners cast a ring of 12 bells for Chelmsford Cathedral, the heaviest weighing 34cwt and sounding note C.

A notable peal of bells from this foundry is located in Sacred Heart Basilica, Timaru and the first set of bells in Wellington, New Zealand, at St Peter's Anglican Church, were made by John Warner & Sons.

John Warner & Sons also cast the 19 bells the Royal Basilica of Saint Francis the Great in Madrid, Spain. For a time, this was the only ring of change ringing bells in mainland Europe.
