= Francis Petre =

New Zealand architect (1847–1918)

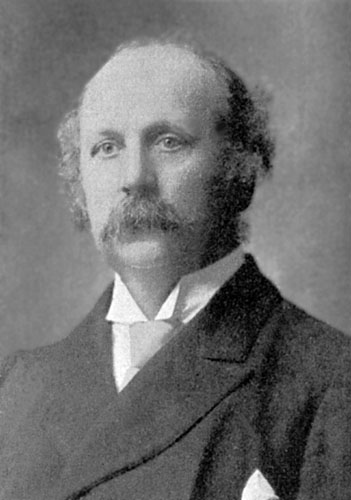
Francis Petre

Francis William Petre (27 August 1847 – 10 December 1918), sometimes known as Frank Petre, was a New Zealand-born architect based in Dunedin. He was an able exponent of the Gothic Revival style, one of its best practitioners in New Zealand. He followed the Catholic Church's initiative to build places of worship in Anglo-Saxon countries inspired by Romance forms of architecture. His basilica Cathedral of the Blessed Sacrament, in Christchurch was demolished in 2021.

Able to work competently in a wide diversity of architectural styles, he was also notable for his pioneering work in concrete development and construction. He designed numerous public and private buildings, many of which are still standing in and around Dunedin. His outstanding buildings are a few of his churches and seminaries, the basis of his international reputation.

== Early life ==
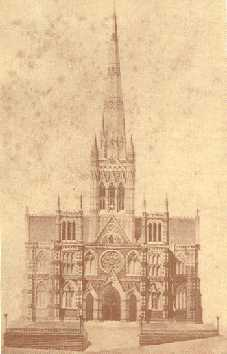
St Joseph's Cathedral, Dunedin, as Petre intended it. This project was never completed.

Petre was a descendant of Dorothy Wadham, a progenitrix of an English crypto-Catholic family and the foundress of Wadham College at Oxford in England in the 17th century. In the 19th century the family was again able to declare its faith. The architect's grandfather invested in the second New Zealand Company.

The Petres were an aristocratic family from Ingatestone in Essex, England. Francis Petre's immediate family was one of the first and most prominent colonial families of New Zealand; Petre Bay, Chatham Island was named after them, as—originally—was the town of Wanganui in the North Island. The Wellington suburb of Thorndon was named after their Thorndon Hall estate in England. Petre was the son of the Hon Henry William Petre, who first came to New Zealand in 1840 as director of the New Zealand Company of which his own father, William Henry Francis Petre, 11th Baron Petre, had been chairman. The New Zealand Company had been set up to promote the colonisation of New Zealand, and bought, sometimes dubiously, thousands of hectares of land from the Māori. Consequently, Henry Petre was one of the founders of Wellington. He was also colonial treasurer of New Munster Province. Henry seems to have been a man of strange appearance, from the description by his contemporary, the New Zealand social commentator Charlotte Godley: "He is immensely tall and thin and looks like a set of fire irons badly hung together".

Francis Petre was born in 1847 at Petone, today a suburb of Lower Hutt in the North Island, which was one of the earliest British settlements in New Zealand. In 1855, in the then British colonial tradition, Petre was sent to England to be educated. He attended the Jesuit school Mount St Mary's College near Sheffield in the north of England. After four years, he left to attend the Royal Naval College, then at Portsmouth (the college moved to Greenwich in 1869). Finding himself unsuited to a naval career he pursued his education in France, where he attended the charismatic priest Benoit Haffreingue's college at Boulogne-sur-Mer. Returning to England, he completed his education at Ushaw College, Durham.

Members of British aristocratic families would generally be possessed of a private income and often entered one of the military services or the church, although other professions were becoming increasingly common. As the third son of the younger son of a peer, it was always clear that Petre would have to provide his own income, and consequently he was apprenticed from 1864 to 1869 to Joseph Samuda of London, a shipbuilder and engineer. Here he received his training in the techniques and skills of concrete manufacturing, which he was to employ with great acclaim in his later architectural career.

Around 1869 Petre qualified as an architect and engineer, and after a brief period in private practice in London working for architect and engineer Daniel Cubitt Nicholls he returned to New Zealand in 1872. He was then employed as an engineer by railway contractors Brogden and Sons. During this period, he oversaw the construction of both the Blenheim–Picton and Dunedin–Balclutha railway lines, as well as the draining of parts of the Taieri Plains and the construction of tunnels on the Otago Central Railway, some of which are today open to the public as part of the Otago Central Rail Trail. When these tasks were completed, he set up his own practice as an engineer and architect in Liverpool Street, Dunedin.

== Architect ==
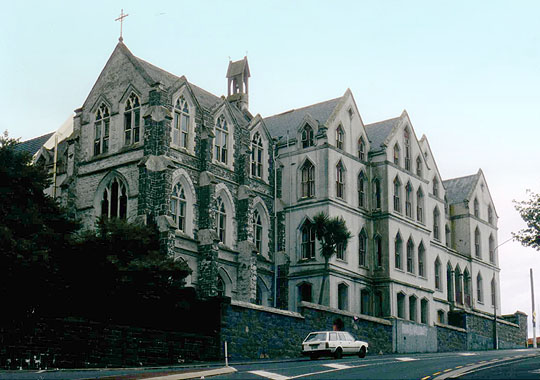
St. Dominic's Priory

From 1875 Petre seems to have devoted his life to architecture. Working by the standard of his day he designed in the Gothic Revival style, which he praised for

the great richness and delicacy of detail, and the closer application of geometrical rules to architecture–more especially in the window tracery which exhibits greater variety of design, together with an easier and more perfect flow into the various parts of the whole structure.

The English Gothic Revival style had become popular for Protestant church architecture in the British colonies, as it had in Britain itself, following the rise of the Oxford Movement—a school of Anglo-Catholic intellectuals who felt that medieval Gothic architecture inspired a greater spirituality than other styles based on non-Christian temples. The Roman Catholic Church, however, of which Petre was a member, wishing to be distinctive, adopted southern continental forms of Gothic and Renaissance architecture. Thus it was that the Catholic Church gave Petre his greatest opportunities of proving his worth as an architect by producing Cathedrals, Basilicas and churches in revived French and Italian styles.

Petre's early speciality was his work in mass concrete, at the time a novel building material in New Zealand. Widely used by the ancient Romans the formula for making it was lost and a new one only invented in the 18th century. Three of Petre's earliest projects were all constructed in this material: Judge Chapman's house (today known as "Castlamore" or "Woodside"), the clifftop villa nicknamed Cargill's Castle in 1876, and St. Dominic's Priory in 1877. However, according to the whims of his patrons, he did also work with more conventional building materials. Recent analysis of the concrete in the Chapman house reveals unreinforced concrete walls, and imported Portland cement used as a binder. It is one of the earliest Portland cement concrete buildings in New Zealand. Cargill's Castle, built only a year or so later has some concrete roofs and floors, and a number of different types of reinforcement.

== St Dominic's Priory, Dunedin ==
St Joseph's Cathedral, the completed church, a fraction of the size originally planned. Minus its intended spire and chancel (illustrated above), it is still an impressive edifice.

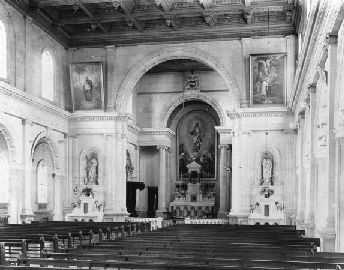
In the classically simple interior of the Cathedral of the Sacred Heart, the altar is given prominence by Serlian arches.The columns in the nave are ionic, supporting a clerestory.

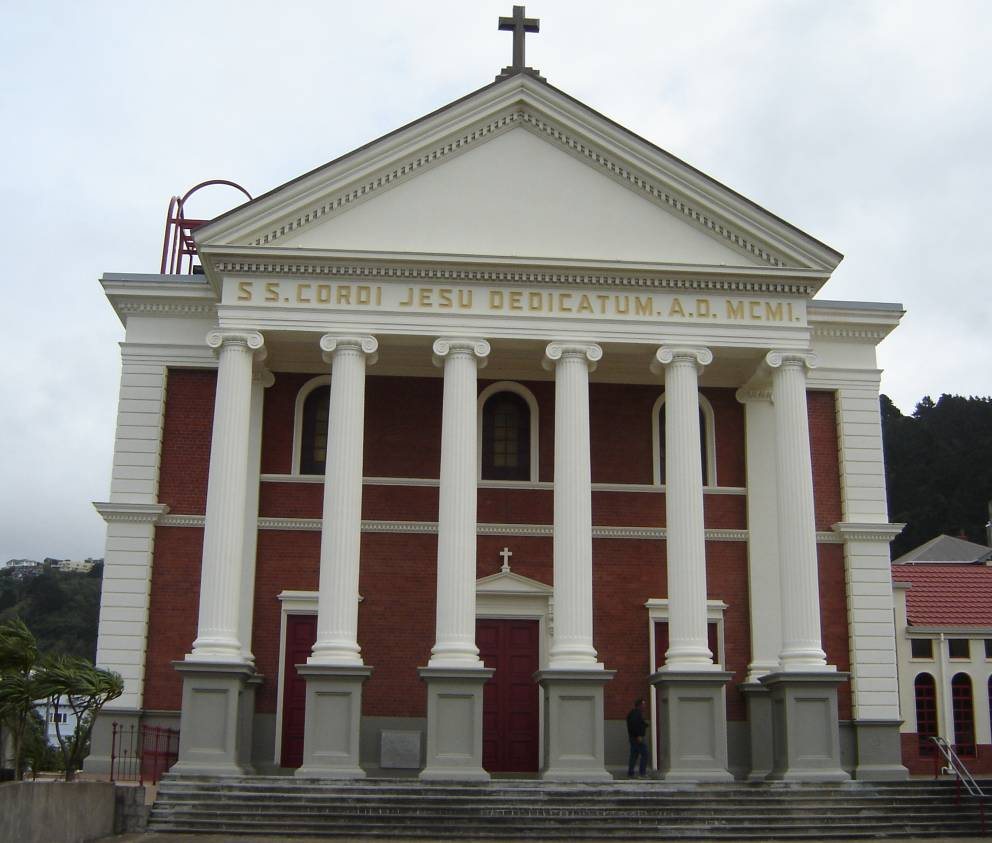
The Cathedral of the Sacred Heart today

Petre described the style of his 1876–77 creation, St Dominic's Priory, as Anglo-Saxon, referring to the straight-sloped window apertures. The style of the building, however, was very much of Petre's own interpretation and only lightly influenced by Anglo-Saxon architecture.

The building is notable for its use of poured concrete, a comparatively new building material in 1870s New Zealand, but one well suited to the creation of the large number of windows in the building's facade. The structure is simultaneously grand and austere, reflecting well its use as a convent.

St Dominic's Priory was the largest un-reinforced concrete building in the southern hemisphere (steel reinforcing being then a little used construction method), and earned Petre the lasting nickname of "Lord Concrete".

== Cathedrals ==
F. W. Petre designed three of New Zealand's cathedrals, each distinguished by a different architectural style: St Joseph's Cathedral in Dunedin, the Cathedral of the Sacred Heart in Wellington and the Cathedral of the Blessed Sacrament in Christchurch.

=== 1878 St Joseph's Cathedral, Dunedin ===
While Petre designed many churches, schools, public buildings, and private houses, his largest and grandest project, the Roman Catholic cathedral at Dunedin, was never fully completed. The entrance facade and the nave are built to the original design, and reveal the cathedral as a prime example of the French Gothic Revival. St Joseph's Cathedral, standing next to St Dominic's Priory, is reminiscent of many of the great Gothic cathedrals of Europe, with its twin towers and central rose window—Chartres and Notre Dame come to mind, although the original design if completed with its tower would have produced a building more like Rouen Cathedral. The architect's intention was for a mighty structure, with the twin towers dwarfed by a lofty spire some 60 metres (200 ft) in height, which would have been a magnificent edifice. In the event, the project stalled when a prudent Roman Catholic diocese reluctant to incur unnecessary debt with the onset of the 1880s depression postponed further work.

Petre's intention, which is clear from the almost 90 pages of drawings held in the diocesan archives, was to design the most impressive cathedral in Australasia. Building began in 1878 and the structure was consecrated in 1886. Its construction is notable for its foundations: 40 massive concrete piles, each over 1.2 metres (four feet) in width, sunk 10 metres (35 ft) into the ground, give the cathedral a firm foundation on the volcanic bedrock. The nave is 24 metres (80 ft) in length and 16 metres (52 ft) in height. The walls are in black basalt with dressings of white Oamaru stone, a combination for which Dunedin and Christchurch architecture is noted (see also Dunedin Railway Station). Petre was later to have two further opportunities for cathedral design, but St. Joseph's remains his largest work in the Gothic style.

=== 1901 Cathedral of the Sacred Heart, Wellington ===
That Wellington's principal Roman Catholic cathedral is today a small, but quite perfect, Romano-Grecian temple is entirely the result of chance. The Sacred Heart Basilica, now a cathedral, was originally designed and conceived as a church to mark the site of the fire-gutted St Mary's Cathedral. Petre had strong family connections to the site, as it and an adjacent plot, now the site of St Mary's College, had been given to the Roman Catholic Church by his father and grandfather. The original cathedral, a grand Gothic structure complete with flying buttresses, had been built in 1850 but was destroyed by fire in 1898. Within two days Petre had been asked to design a new church on the site. A decision was taken, however, to build the new Cathedral nearer the more densely populated areas of Wellington, Te Aro and Newtown. Petre later published plans for this cathedral in 1903, describing his proposed structure as "Roman, bordering on to Florentine Renaissance, treated liberally". This cathedral project never came to fruition, but what was quickly constructed was the Church, or Basilica, of "The Sacred Heart" on the razed cathedral site.

Architectural ideas of the mid-19th century advanced by such architects as Pugin, and still adhered to by the recently deceased prominent New Zealand architect Benjamin Mountfort, decreed that only Gothic was suitable for Christian worship. Ignoring these old-fashioned and now expensive rules, Petre designed the new church in the Palladian style, which in this country had only a few years before been considered almost too heretical for worship.

The design was theatrical in the extreme. The imposing principal facade of Oamaru Stone consisted almost solely of one huge portico constructed of six ionic columns, while the facade was crowned by a high pediment more in the style of Vitruvius than Palladio, and behind the great facade stretched the single body of the church, with the remaining facades in a less severe Romanesque style. Considering that his brief was that "a serviceable church in brick should be erected on the site of the old Cathedral", it is amazing that such an almost avant-garde style should have been permitted. The completed structure would not be out of place in 17th century or 18th century Rome or Venice.

The interior of the church continued the Palladian theme. The large nave was colonnaded, with the columns supporting a clerestory of arch-topped windows, while the chancel was approached through an enormous arch that mirrored the classic Palladian Serlian arch, providing theatre and drama at the high altar. The flat compartmentalised ceiling is a more restrained version of that of the church of Santa Maria dei Miracoli, Venice. Unfortunately, the church's twin bell towers had to be removed following an earthquake in 1942.

The cost of the new church was taken from funds intended for the construction of the new cathedral, thus delaying that project. After seventy years of delays, the intention to build the new cathedral was finally abandoned. In 1984, following new enlargements and additions, Petre's church of the Sacred Heart was reconsecrated as Wellington's principal Roman Catholic Cathedral. In 1901 when the church was designed, Petre's use of the Palladian as a style for such a high-profile building would have been unusual in New Zealand.

=== 1904 Cathedral of the Blessed Sacrament, Christchurch ===
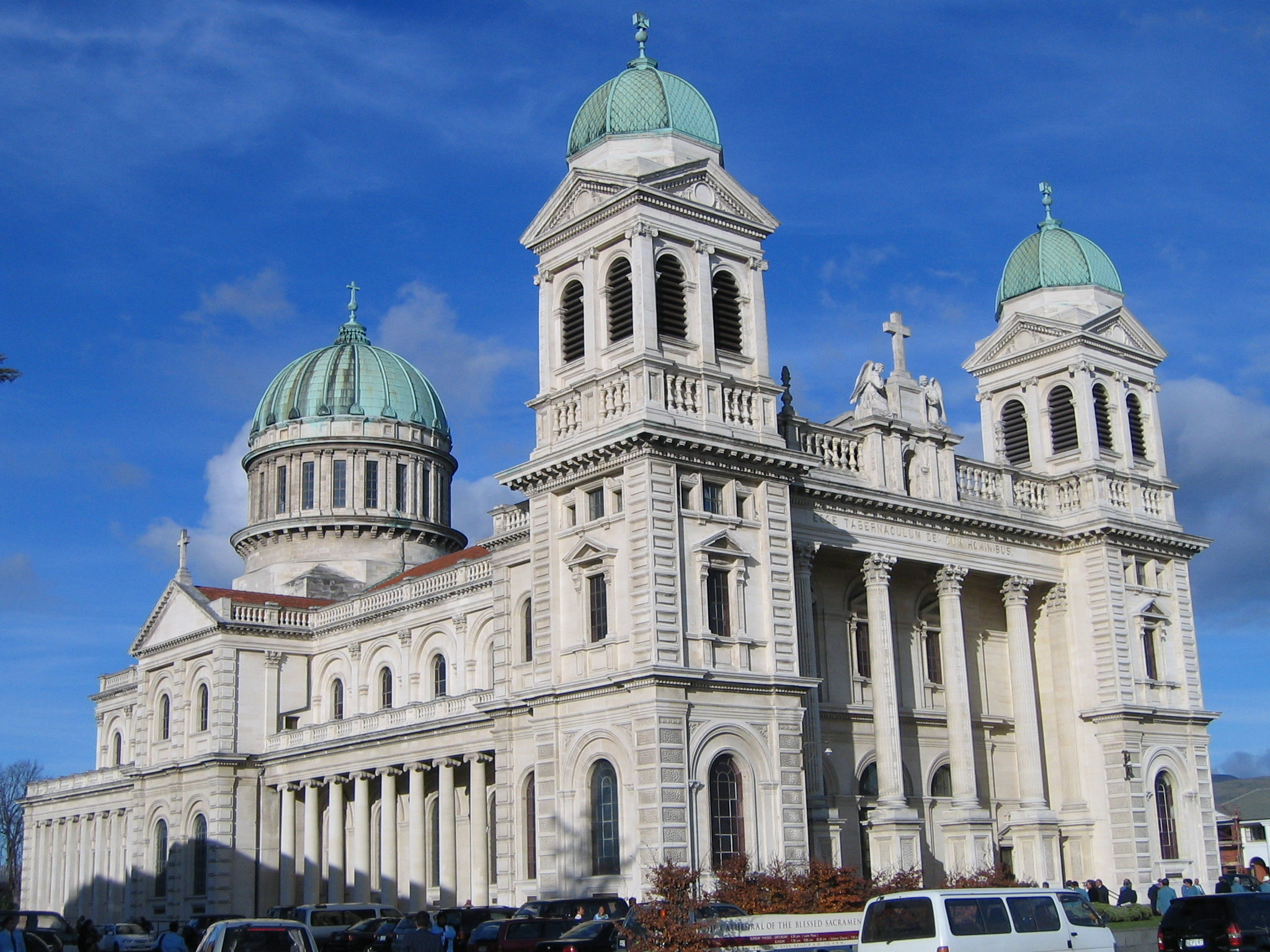
Cathedral of the Blessed Sacrament, Christchurch, F. W. Petre's largest completed work. The central pediment is in the style of Sebastiano Serlio.

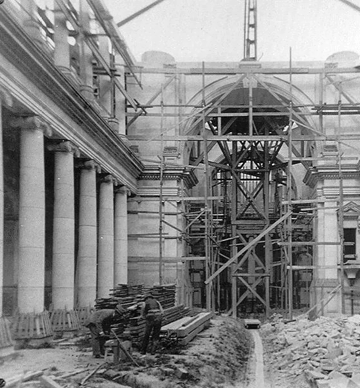
Cathedral of The Blessed Sacrament, Christchurch, under construction. The nave is lined with Ionic columns.

Of all Petre's many designs, the most outstanding is usually considered to be the Roman Catholic Cathedral of the Blessed Sacrament in Christchurch, commonly known as the Christchurch Basilica. Commenced in 1901, it replaced a smaller wooden church designed by Benjamin Mountfort that had been in use since 1864. The cathedral was officially opened on 12 February 1905, a mere four years after construction began. The building, said by some to be based on the 19th-century Church of Vincent-de-Paul in Paris, has been held to be the finest renaissance style building in Australasia.

Forsaking Mountfort's 19th-century Gothic, Petre designed the new church in a Renaissance, Italian basilica style, albeit with one major exception. Ignoring Renaissance convention, Petre obtained a greater visual impact by siting the Italianate green copper-roofed dome not above the crossing (as in St. Peter's Basilica in Rome), but directly above the sanctuary. In Petre's opinion, this design element, coupled with the Byzantine apse, added extra grandeur and theatre to the high altar set in the tribune. The nave and chancel roofs were supported by colonnades of ionic columns and the entrance facade of the cathedral was flanked by twin towers in the manner of many of Europe's great renaissance churches.

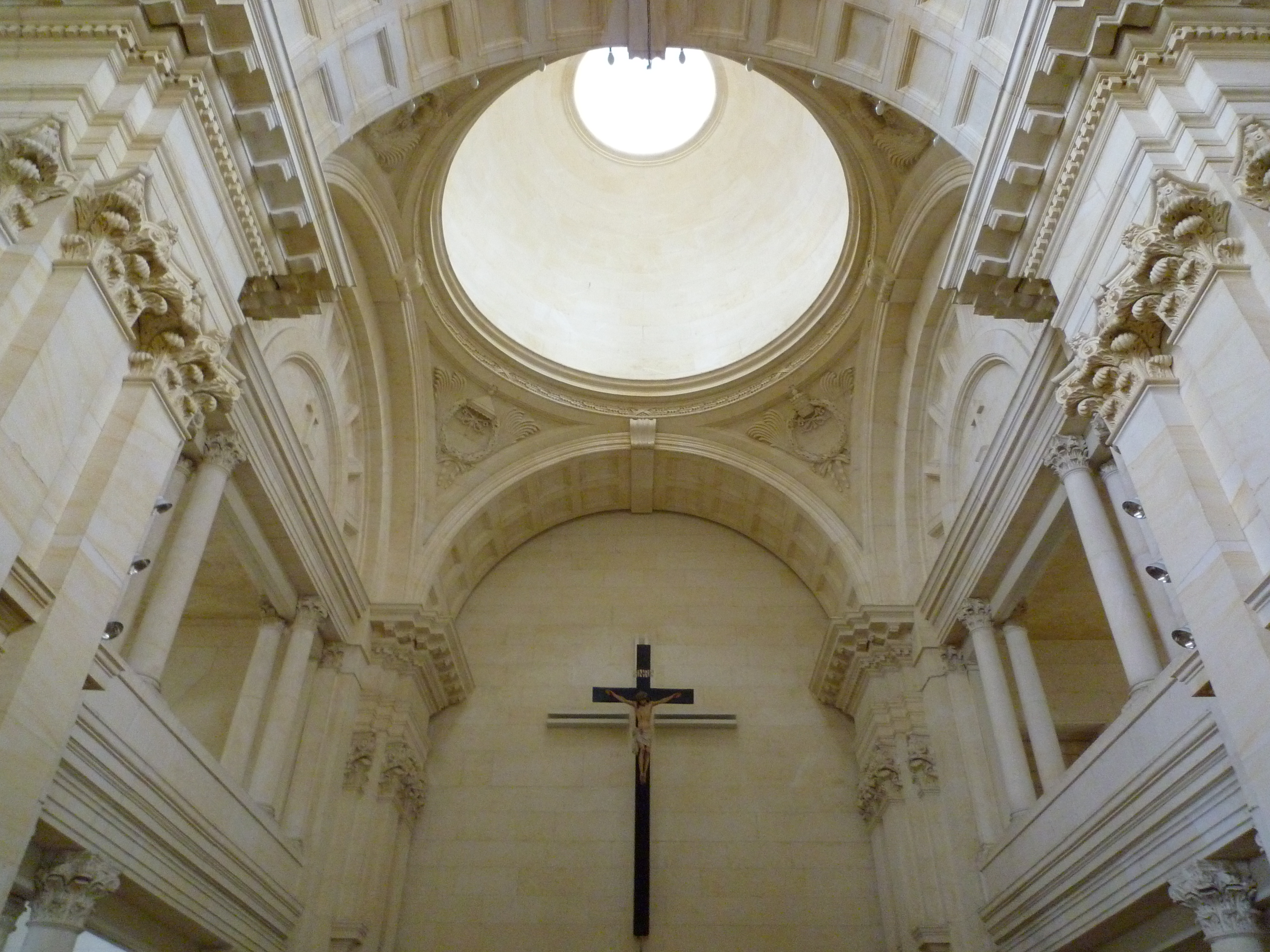
St. Patrick's Basilica, Oamaru, crossing and main dome interior

While often likened to St. Paul's Cathedral in London, it is conceivable that the greatest influence behind this great structure was Benoit Haffreingue. During Petre's formative years studying under Haffreingue in France, Haffreingue had been the driving force of the reconstruction of the Basilica of Notre-Dame in Boulogne-sur-Mer, a French cathedral that has a very similar plan to that of The Blessed Sacrament, including the controversial siting of the dome over the altar rather than the centre of the cathedral.

The cathedral, constructed of concrete sheathed in Oamaru limestone, was widely acclaimed, causing the famous author George Bernard Shaw to describe Petre as a "New Zealand Brunelleschi". Fifty men were employed on the site, and in excess of 120,000 cubic ft (3400 m³) of stone, 4000 cubic ft (110 m³) of concrete, and 90 tons of steel were used in the construction. Problems with finding suitable stone for the construction of such a large structure caused financial difficulties during the construction, and a special bill was pushed through parliament by then Premier Richard Seddon to aid with the financing of the building. The total cost to the Roman Catholic diocese was £52,000.

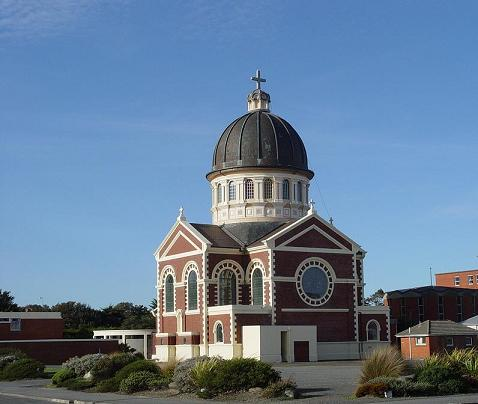
St Mary's Basilica, Invercargill

After sustaining minor damage in the 2010 Canterbury earthquake, the cathedral was seriously damaged by the February 2011 earthquake. Both bell towers collapsed and the main dome was destabilised. The upper parts of the cathedral are being dismantled, and the main dome has been removed. In August 2019, there is well founded and widespread speculation that the cathedral would have to be demolished as complete renovation would too costly, and partial renovation would leave the building "not fit for purpose".

=== Other churches ===
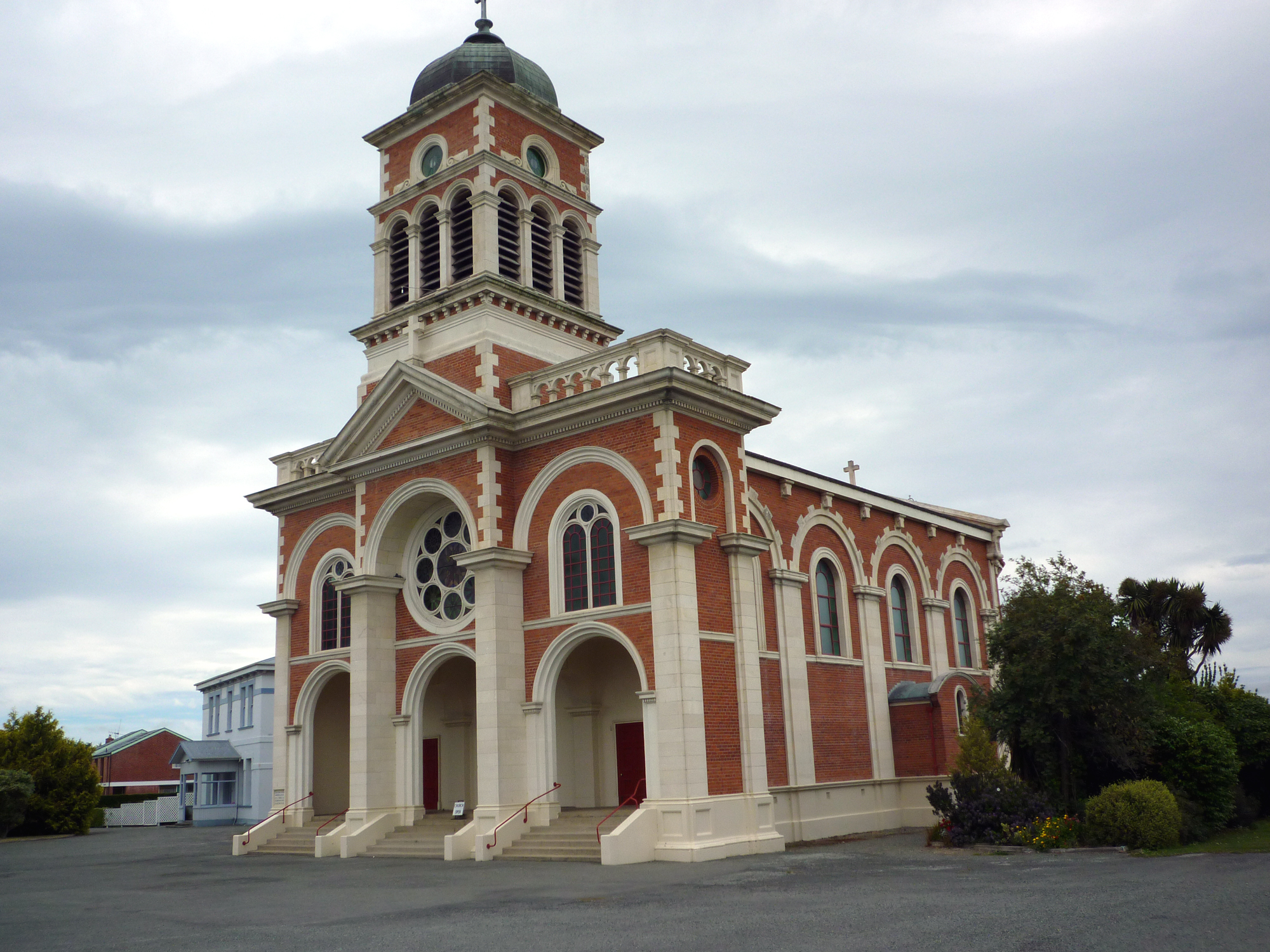
St Patrick's Basilica, Waimate

Apart from the many smaller churches Petre designed (see List of buildings by Francis Petre) there are several notable ones in a similar design to the Cathedral of the Blessed Sacrament and St Patrick's Basilica, Oamaru. These are St Patrick's Basilica, Waimate, St. Mary's Basilica, Invercargill, Sacred Heart Basilica, Timaru, (the Timaru Basilica), and St Patrick's Basilica, South Dunedin. All are large and impressive churches.

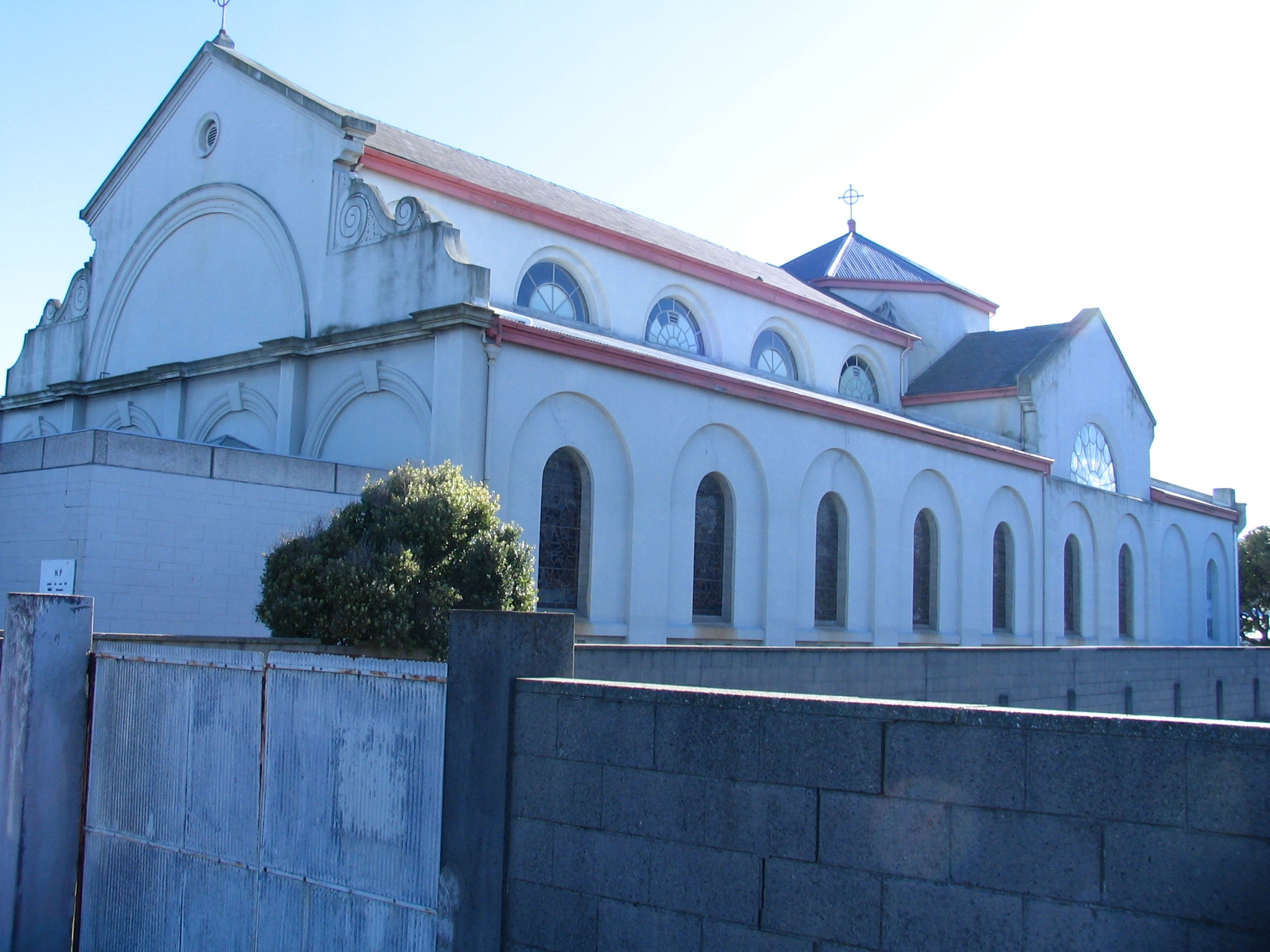
St Patrick's Basilica, Dunedin showing its succession of arches on the west wall

St Patrick's Basilica, South Dunedin explores a Palladian Revival style, and was Petre's first departure form the neo-gothic style of St Joseph's Dunedin. The building has many significant architectural features. This photograph shows how the walls are constructed using a succession of arches surmounted by stone which forms part of the roofs of the aisles.

== Domestic architecture ==
The styles in which F. W. Petre designed his private houses were as diverse as those of his cathedrals and churches. It seems that, unlike many notable architects, he designed according to the wishes of his clients: those who wanted a castle received a castle, and those who wished for a small mansion disguised as an English Tudor cottage were equally fortunate.

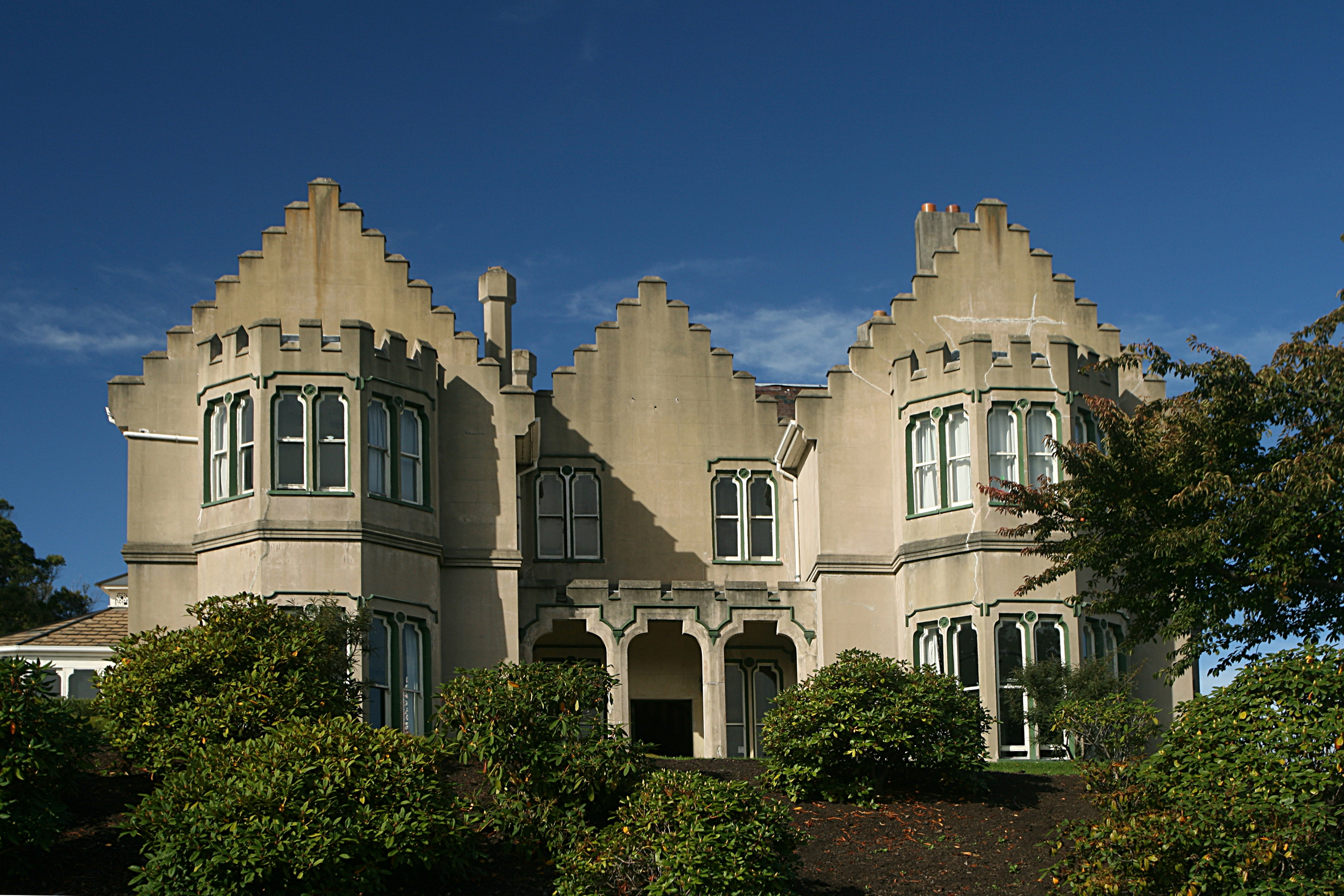
"Castlamore", Lovelock Avenue, Dunedin, designed by F. W. Petre. This Gothic house, with crow stepped gables, hints at a castlelike Scottish baronial theme, but has none of the Gothic gloom and sobriety of the small lancet windows and turrets often associated with the style.

A large private residence designed by Petre can be found in Lovelock Avenue, Dunedin. It was originally built for Judge Chapman in 1875 and christened "Woodside", though it has been known throughout much of its history as "Castlamore". This imposing structure sits on the slopes of the Dunedin Botanic Gardens close to the University of Otago, and is an exercise in restraint. The castle atmosphere is there, almost a Scottish baronial castle, but the battlements are merely hinted at by stepped gables. Large bay windows, allowing light to flood in, again merely hint at the Gothic; one has to study them closely to perceive that they consist of a series of lancet type windows. The large octagonal chimneys reflect the design rather than being ostentatious.

Thus, the design appears as a comfortable dwelling complete with loggia and conservatory. A lesser architect might not have been able to resist the addition of a small turret or pinnacle. Petre's ingenuity lay in knowing how to mix large windows and more comfortable features with the medieval, and then ascertaining the exact moment to halt the Gothic theme before it became a pastiche of the original. In this way Petre was referring in a modest way to the original Gothic Revival period as conceived by such architects as James Wyatt, rather than the later Gothic, after it had fallen under the ecclesiastical Anglo-Catholic influences of such architects as Augustus Pugin in England, and Benjamin Mountfort in New Zealand.

One of Petre's abilities was that he could vary his styles of architecture. In 1883 he built a mansion in Christchurch known as "Llanmaes" for a local merchant. The style selected came to be known in New Zealand as the "English Cottage" style. This was a complete reversal of his previous work: rather than impressive grandeur, this style was intended to evoke nostalgic rustic charm. Similar in nature to the work of George Devey at a similar time in England, the style was a form of idealised Tudor with half-timbered black beams set into white painted walls, beneath beamed gables and tiled roofs. This form of design eventually became very popular in New Zealand from around 1910.

Two of Petre's "English Cottages" exist close to each other in Cliffs Road, Dunedin, overlooking the sea in the suburb of St Clair. Pinner House (pictured below) is a perfect example of this traditional style, adapted for the brighter and warmer southern climate, with large windows and verandahs. It was built in the 1880s for Aufrere Fenwick, one of Dunedin's main stockbrokers. Opposite, a very similar house was constructed by Petre for his own residence.

== Personal life ==
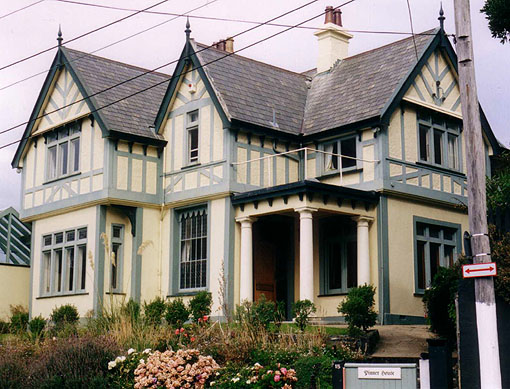
Pinner House, Dunedin: a perfect example of the "English Cottage" style which Petre popularised at the beginning of the 20th century

One of Petre's first large houses, the folly-like Cargill's Castle, was built for Edward Cargill, at the time a local politician, a former member of parliament (1862–1865), and later a mayor of Dunedin. It is also very likely that Petre was the supervisor of the construction of a tunnel that Cargill had driven to a private secluded beach below the castle (today known as Tunnel Beach). The Italianate mansion (called a castle) was gutted by fire in the 1940s, and is today a preserved ruin. While designing the house, Petre fell in love with Cargill's daughter Margaret. After a difficult courtship (due to Petre's staunch Catholicism and the Cargill family's equally staunch Presbyterianism) the couple were eventually permitted to marry, the wedding taking place in the villa's principal salon on 1 March 1881. Petre and his wife had thirteen children; Petre himself had been the third child of sixteen.

In 1903, Petre was appointed Consular Agent for Italy in Dunedin following the death of Edward Cargill. He was a founder member of the New Zealand Institute of Architects, was elected a Fellow in 1905, and was president of the institute in 1907–08. Unusually for a man at the peak of his profession, Petre was known as congenial and popular. He died at Dunedin, in December 1918, following 42 years of architectural practice and two days after the opening of the finally completed St Patrick's Basilica, Oamaru. He was buried at the Andersons Bay Cemetery, Dunedin.

== Evaluation ==
Dunedin was a dynamic place for an architect to be in the late 19th century, due to its great prosperity and subsequent expansion just before and after 1900. These were largely the result of the Otago gold rush of the 1860s, the subsequent development of the refrigerated meat export trade and then the gold-dredging boom.

Petre certainly did not obtain his many important commissions because of a lack of competing architects. The equally versatile R. A. Lawson was responsible for several important buildings in the city including the neoclassical ANZ Bank building and the Gothic revival Presbyterian First Church. W. B. Armson designed the Italian Renaissance Bank of New Zealand building in 1879, and George Troup was responsible for the magnificent Dunedin Railway Station. Italian-born architect Louis Boldini was also designing buildings in Dunedin at the same time, notably the 1883 Grand Hotel. Nor did Petre obtain work, with the possible exception of the Sacred Heart Basilica at Wellington, because of his family connections. On the contrary, his Catholicism, at the height of the British Empire, possibly lost him more ecclesiastical commissions than those for which he was ever engaged. What stood out was his engineer's practicalities at overcoming almost impossible difficulties. St. Joseph's Cathedral was built not only on the side of a hill, but also in a gully. His pioneering work with concrete and steel was of enormous value in a country where earthquakes were a constant risk.

Petre's buildings, in whatever style, all have one common denominator: an attention to the smallest detail. It was said that his drawings of stones, window traceries, arches and ornamentation were so precise that stonemasons could execute his intentions from one single drawing. It is this attention to detail which is outstanding, whether the simple carving on the capital of an Ionic column or the heavy ornate work on the monumental corbel of a Gothic design. While this precision enabled him to work as successfully in a wide range of styles as he did, it in no way inhibited his sense of developing design. In his own words, an architectural style could be "treated liberally", and this is the key to the individuality of his designs. Dunedin's Royal Exchange building is a Palladian town Palace, yet has an almost Rastrellian restrained baroque design. Cargill's Castle would not have looked out of place in the Cimini Hills; it also has an almost hacienda spirit. His work in the Gothic style was lighter and more delicate than that of Alfred Waterhouse, and equal in detail to Augustus Pugin's. It has been said of his work that he never fully developed his vision or overcame the limitations of his training, but his experience as an engineer equipped him to find sound innovative solutions to construction problems. His placing the dome at the Blessed Sacrament over the altar has also been criticised, as many feel it does not cohere to the design. However, others feel it was a stroke of genius, enhancing the interior.

Francis Petre's work cannot be judged against that of the great classical architects of the northern hemisphere, who so clearly influenced him. He did not create a style or have a revival period named after him. His achievement was adapting and developing so many established styles well; whether through the new techniques of steel or concrete, or through more traditional building methods. He was given amazing opportunities to prove himself worthy as an accomplished and inspired architect; the many monumental buildings with which he provided New Zealand are testimony to his talent.

== See also ==
- List of buildings by Francis Petre
