= Cargill's Castle =

Castle ruins in Dunedin, New Zealand

Coordinates: 45.91789°S 170.48052°E

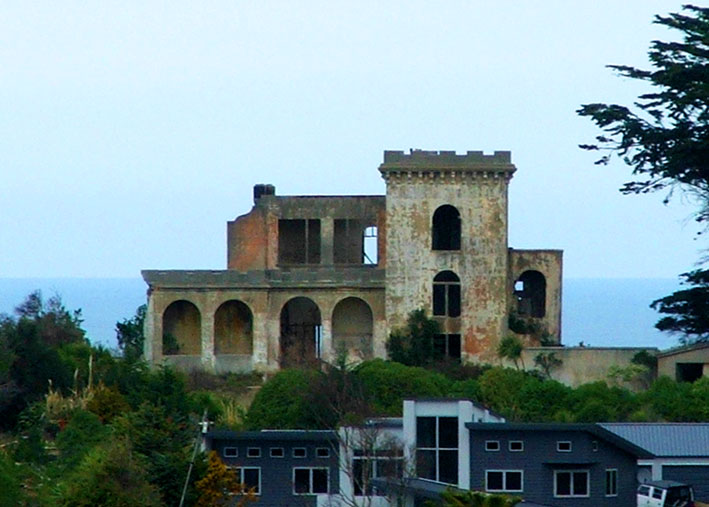
The ruins of Cargill's Castle, now surrounded by new residential subdivisions, in southwest Dunedin, New Zealand.

The ruins of Cargill's Castle stand on a promontory overlooking the Pacific Ocean in New Zealand's southern city of Dunedin. It is one of about ten castles in New Zealand, the other one in Otago being nearby Larnach Castle. More a castle in name than in fact, this Italianate mansion was built for Edward Cargill, eighth child of city founder William Cargill, in the late 19th century, who called it The Cliffs. Designed by the young architect Francis Petre, and built in concrete by Harry Lyders at a cost of £14,000, it was completed in 1877. Several kilometres south of the castle is Tunnel Beach, so named because this quiet beach is only accessible through a steeply sloping tunnel cut into the 60 metres (200 ft) high cliffs by the Cargill family. It is also very likely that Petre was the supervisor of the construction of the tunnel. While designing the house, Petre fell in love with Cargill's daughter Margaret. After a difficult courtship (due to Petre's staunch Catholicism and the Cargill family's equally staunch Presbyterianism) the couple were eventually permitted to marry, the wedding taking place in the villa's principal salon on 1 March 1881.

The building was gutted by a fire in 1892, Cargill restored the castle but was unable to meet the cost of replacing all the wooden furnishings, though he did add a ballroom. The castle had several owners after Cargill's death in 1903, and was opened as a restaurant and cabaret in the 1930s by John Hutton, which became popular with visiting servicemen during World War II. Plans have been made on several occasions to restore the building to its former glory, but none have yet borne fruit. The castle now lies in ruins, a shell of what it once was. There is no public access to the site.

== Construction ==
The house is built from concrete, with concrete roofs on the loggia and the tower, and concrete floors. Several different types of reinforcement were used, which makes this an early example of the technology both in New Zealand and overseas.
