= Wreys Bush =

Coordinates: 46°01′S 168°06′E

Wreys Bush (also known as Annandale) is a town near Winton, New Zealand and 8 minutes' drive from Nightcaps, Southland, New Zealand.

== History ==
Wreys Bush was named after Walter Wrey. It was formerly known as Run153 or described as "wastelands of the Crown". In June 1857, Wrey and Herbert Seymour relocated 2500 sheep on the ship Taranaki from Nelson, New Zealand to stock Run153. This was the start of Wreys Bush. Walter ended up building a sod and a thatch hut (site of the future Annandale homestead), and he lived there for about two weeks; he died at the infant settlement of Invercargill. Pioneer diaries described Wreys Bush as "desolate bush" and "spurs more holey than righteous". William Johnston ended up being the owner of Annadale in 1869.

Wreys Bush was a popular stopover for wagoners, drovers and gold miners; they usually stayed at one of the Wreys Bush hotels. Annadale eventually got split up into farms which were owned by Irish farmers; most of them were Catholic. In 1899 St Peter's Convent School was opened and was run by the Sisters of Mercy. Before 1899 there was Wreys Bush Public School; after the opening of the convent school, the public school only had one non-Catholic student; they had no choice but to close down the school. It is unknown where the public school used to stand; however, the convent still stands today (now used as a home), but the school itself doesn't stand today. In 1901 there was a population of 289 according to the 1901 census, there were two pubs, two stores, a blacksmith, a saddler, a bootmaker and other services. There was a church, but there is very little information known. The church is not standing today, but the priest's house still is. The church was demolished because the people of Wreys Bush did not want it to turn into a hay-barn.

When coal was discovered in Nightcaps, the sisters opened a new school, St Patricks (it is still a school today), in Nightcaps in 1917. In 1936 St Peter's closed (Wreys Bush). They also had a convent in Nightcaps; this convent is now a bed & breakfast in Te Anau, New Zealand. Wreys Bush stopped and was forgotten because of the discovery of coal.

Today in Wreys Bush the Wreys Bush Pub is still in business known as "The Bush" (the other pub is gone with the blacksmith, bootmaker two stores, saddler and the church); there is also a gun club and a car service garage.
