= St Patrick's Basilica, South Dunedin =

St Patrick's Basilica
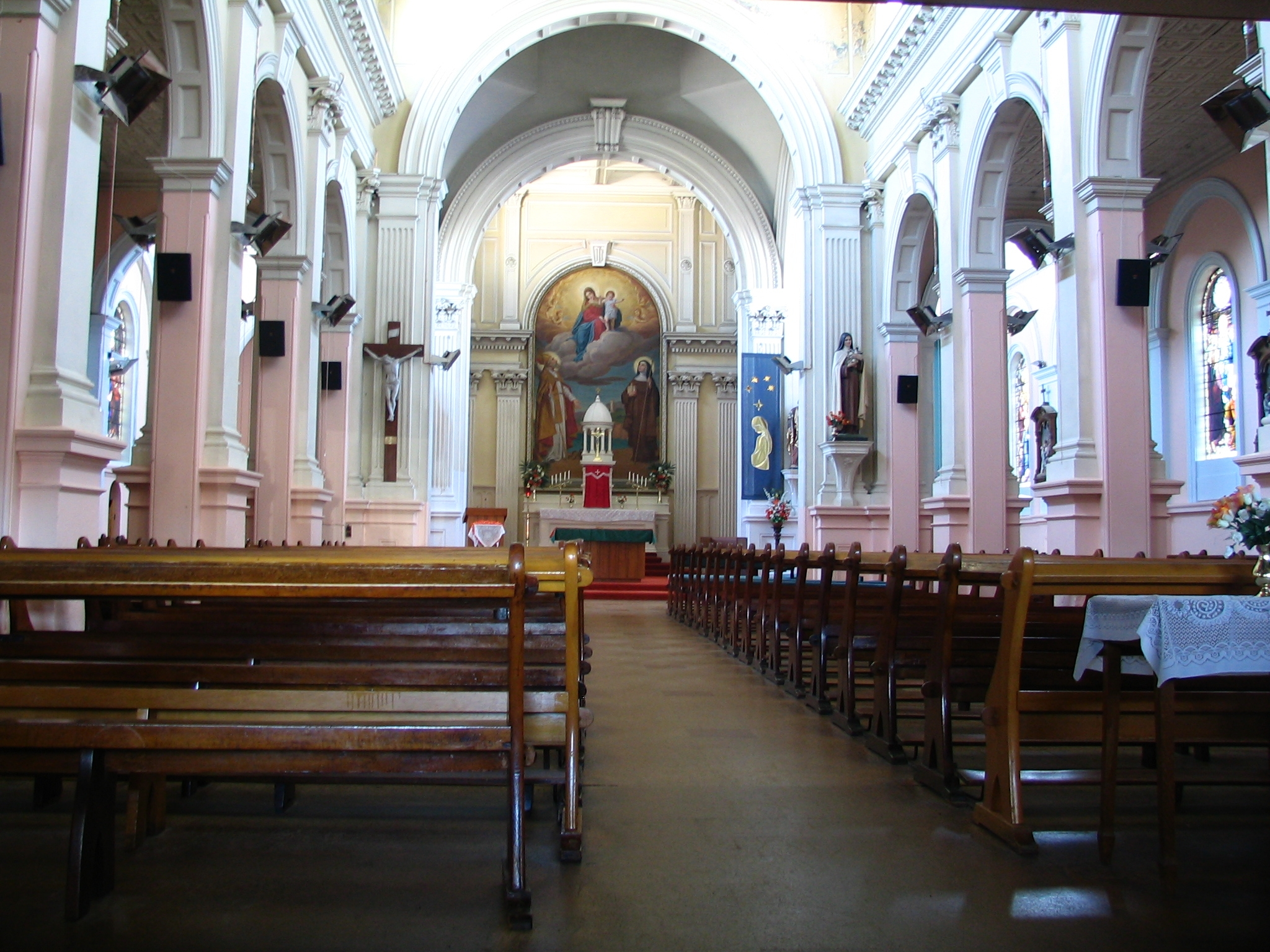
- St Patrick's Basilica, South Dunedin, interior
- St Patrick's Basilica
- 45°53′42″S 170°30′11″E
- Location: Dunedin, Otago
- Country: New Zealand
- Denomination: Catholic
- Website: St Patrick's Basilica, South Dunedin

History
- Founded: 1878
- Dedication: St Patrick
- Dedicated: 1894

Architecture
- Functional status: parish church
- Architect: Francis Petre
- Architectural type: Palladian Revival
- Style: Roman Renaissance
- Groundbreaking: 20 March 1892
- Completed: 7 October 1894

Administration
- Province: Wellington
- Diocese: Dunedin
- Parish: St Patrick's

Heritage New Zealand – Category 2
- Designated: 23 September 2005
- Reference no.: 2213

St Patrick's Basilica in South Dunedin, New Zealand (opened in 1894) is a Catholic church and was the architect Francis Petre's first departure from the Gothic style exemplified in his St. Joseph's Cathedral, Dunedin.

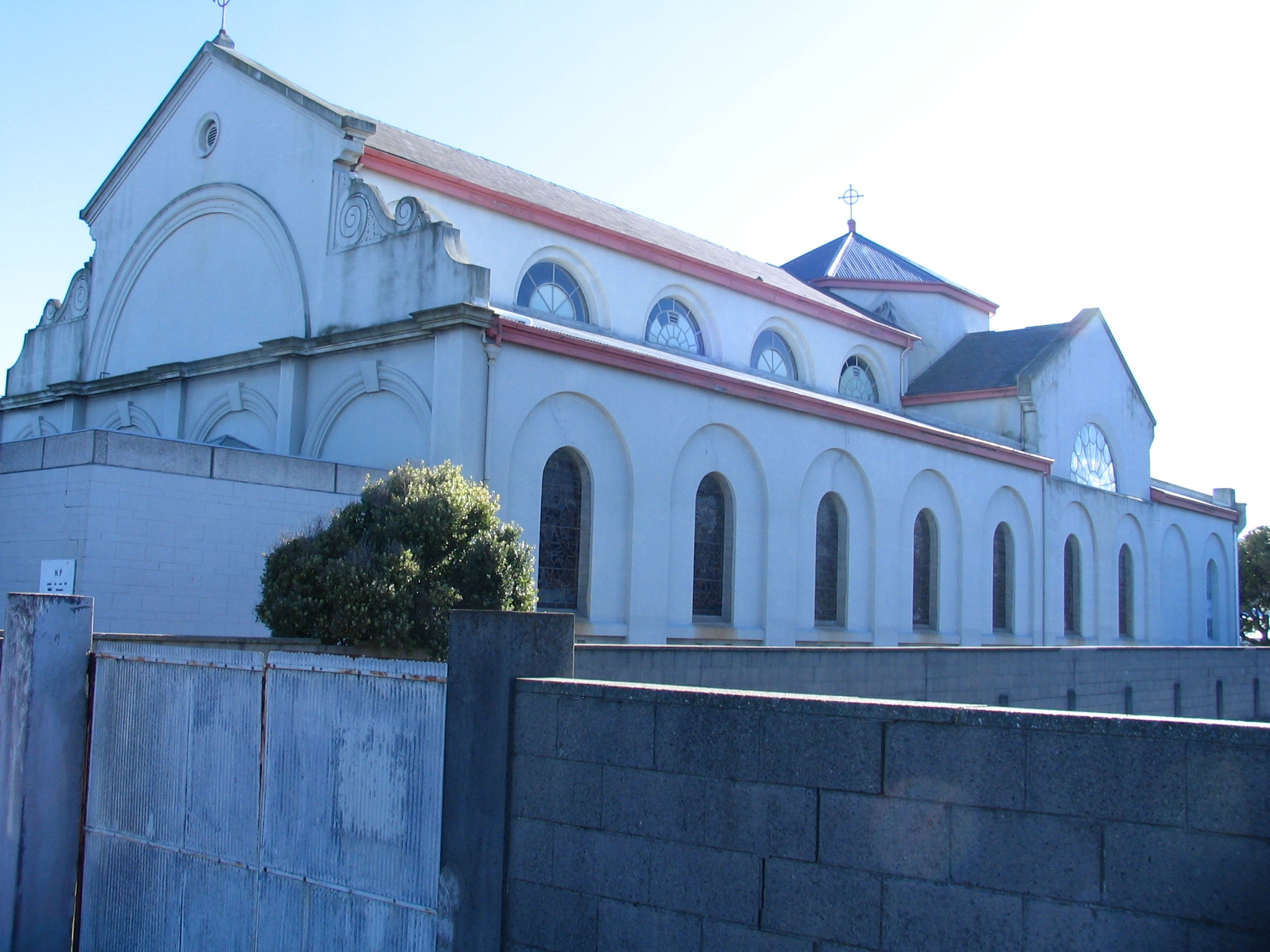
St.Patrick's Basilica, South Dunedin, exterior.

== The Basilica ==
The exterior is incomplete and is "only a shadow of what the architect intended", but the impressive interior is completely realised. With St Patrick's Basilica, Petre turned to the Palladian Revival style with which he is most associated. The interior in contrast to the earlier neo-Gothic style of the cathedral, is richly embellished with classical detailing.

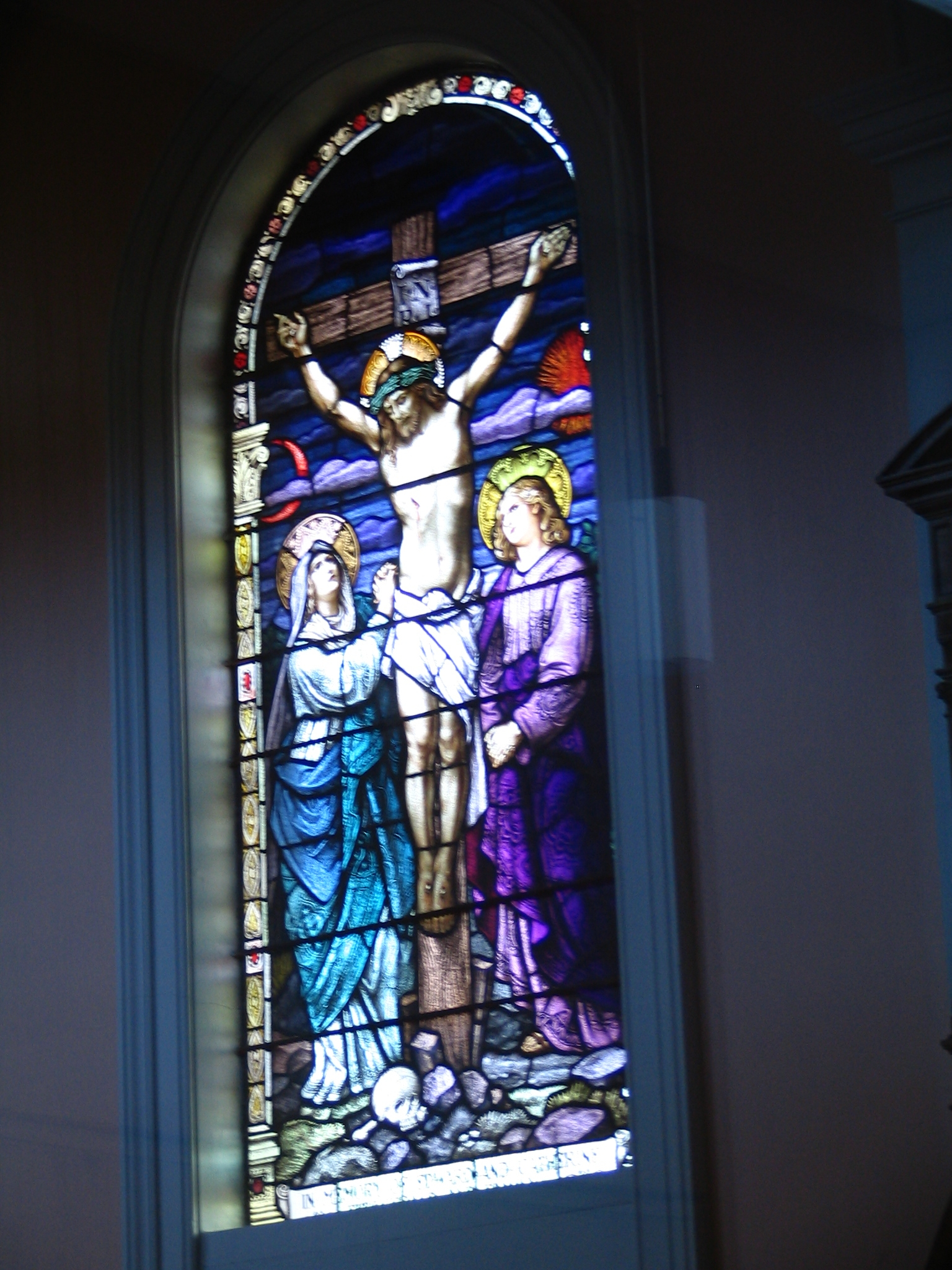
St Patrick's Basilica, South Dunedin, Stained glass window representation of the fifth sorrowful mystery of the Rosary, The Crucifixion

Its single greatest feature is the deeply embossed High Renaissance ceiling, a feature which occurs in many variations in Petre's later work, most notably in St Patrick's Basilica, Oamaru (ceiling installed in 1898) and Sacred Heart Cathedral, Wellington (1901). In many respects St Patrick's Basilica foreshadows Petre's Wellington cathedral (the other Petre church most like St Patrick's Basilica), the Cathedral of the Blessed Sacrament, Christchurch (1905), and the last of his major churches, Sacred Heart Basilica, Timaru (1911).

== Features ==
The interior features a large arcaded nave forming a clerestory with two side aisles and a large arch forming the entrance to the sanctuary. Walls are built in a succession of arches surmounted by a cornice of stone which forms part of the roofs of the aisles. Series of stone pilasters are ranged against the walls and on the sides of piers. The style of the capitals of the pilasters is Corinthian. The Basilica has retained its high altar (behind a modern one installed for the post-Vatican II liturgy) and features many fine statues. The 14 great stained glass windows (made by F X Zettler in Munich and purchased through H Credington & Co, Melbourne) represent the mysteries of the Rosary with one (the third sorrowful mystery, "The Crowning with Thorns") omitted. The Sanctuary is dominated by a large oil painting by Giuseppi Brazi of St Patrick and St Brigid interceding with Our Blessed Lady and her Divine Son. The Stations of the Cross, which are of terracotta and framed in oak, were made in Paris in 1901. Thomas Heffernan and his wife Margaret were significant funders of the church and they are notably memorialised in one of the windows.

== Devotion ==
St Patricks is known as a centre of Catholic devotion in Dunedin. "I was only in the parish a few days when I realised the great number of people who came in prayer on their way to work, on their way home, on their way shopping, on their way to pick up children at school." This devotion was accentuated (especially in the 1950s-1970s) by the Novena in honour of Our Lady. This was held every Saturday night at 7.00 pm and consisted of prayers, hymns, a short homily, the reading of petitions placed in the box at the shrine of Our Lady of Perpetual Succour, some thanksgivings and finally Benediction. "Large numbers came to the novena, from all over the city. They filled the seats and stood in the aisles and porch. The devotion was followed with great numbers flocking to the four confessionals, where the priests remained for lengthy periods." The novena was so popular that a special bus provided transport for those in outlying parishes who wished to attend.

== Anniversary ==
St Patrick's 125th anniversary was celebrated in October 2019 over a weekend. Over 500 people attend a combined Sunday Mass con-celebrated by Bishop Michael Dooley and Bishop Paul Martin followed by a shared lunch outside in fine weather to enjoy food, friendship, music and a bouncy castle for the children. At the commencement on the Friday night, current parishioner Jo Bell organised a replica set of novena celebration which 130 people attended. On the Saturday night, Sean Brosnahan, a curator at Toitu Otago Settlers Museum, gave a presentation on the history of the basilica. He noted that the early history of St Patrick's was influenced by the diversity of population in the South Dunedin "flats" area and the particular concentration of Catholic Irish people there. He spoke also of two important figures in the history of the church. These were prosperous roading contractor and important contributor to the church, Thomas Heffernan, and Francis Petre, St Patrick's Basilica's architect.

== See also ==
- Roman Catholic Diocese of Dunedin
- South Dunedin
- Otago
- Francis Petre
