= Sacred Heart Basilica, Timaru =

Church in South Canterbury, New Zealand

Sacred Heart Basilica
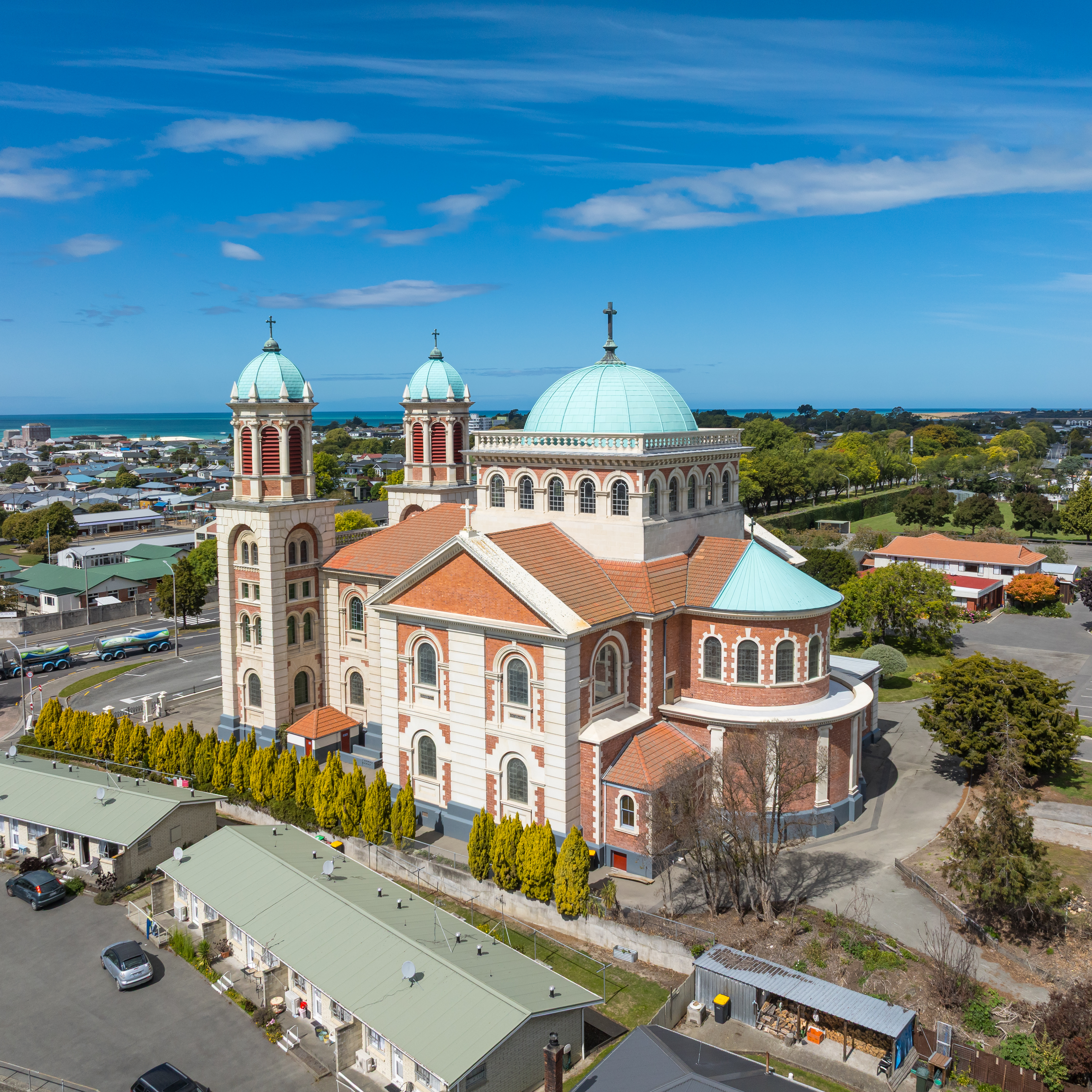
- Sacred Heart Basilica, Timaru
- Sacred Heart Basilica
- 44.4016°S 171.2475°E
- Location: Timaru, South Canterbury
- Country: New Zealand
- Denomination: Catholic

History
- Founded: 25 October 1874
- Founder: Father John Tubman S.M.
- Dedication: Sacred Heart of Jesus
- Dedicated: 1 October 1911
- Consecrated: 1 October 1911

Architecture
- Functional status: parish church
- Heritage designation: Category I
- Designated: 2 April 1982
- Architect: Francis Petre
- Architectural type: Palladian Revival; Byzantine Revival
- Style: Roman Renaissance
- Groundbreaking: 6 February 1910
- Completed: 1911
- Construction cost: £23,000

Specifications
- Capacity: 1,000 seated

Administration
- Province: Wellington
- Diocese: Christchurch
- Parish: Sacred Heart

The Sacred Heart Basilica or Timaru Basilica, is a Catholic church in Timaru, New Zealand. The term basilica is used to describe the building's Roman basilican style. style. It was designed by the New Zealand architect, Francis Petre and is one of his most celebrated works. Its size and appearance make it one of the most important historic buildings of Timaru and of the South Canterbury region. The Basilica's twin towers and copper cupola are highly visible features of the Timaru skyline, especially from the south. The Basilica is also one of the "most noteworthy examples of ecclesiastical architecture" in New Zealand with elements of "Roman and Byzantine architecture with touches of Art Nouveau decoration." It is a registered historic place, category 1.

== Basilica ==
The Basilica of the Sacred Heart is the third church built on the Craigie Avenue property. A wooden chapel was opened on 25 October 1874, and was replaced three years later by a larger church. Increasing numbers of parishioners dictated the need for a further, and even larger building. The inspiration for the design of the Basilica came during a visit to the United States by the Parish Priest Father John Tubman. His brother was a priest at the Catholic cathedral of Reno, Nevada, and Fr Tubman was impressed with the design of that church. So it is that the exterior of the Timaru Basilica bears resemblance to the Saint Thomas Aquinas Cathedral in Reno, Nevada.

Upon his return to Timaru in 1907 Fr. Tubman had plans drawn up, based on photographs he brought back with him. The plans were drawn by the noted Dunedin architect, Francis Petre. Although Fr. Tubman thought the plan for the proposed building too ambitious, he was encouraged to continue the large project by the Bishop of Christchurch, John Grimes S.M. Fr. Tubman had at the time £7,000. In order to maintain the budget, the tradesmen were paid at the end of each day. Bart Moriarty, a surveyor, was engaged to oversee the construction. Many district farmers contributed their labour and materials. Farmers at the Levels felled blue gums to use as scaffolding, and transported them to the site. Parishioners from St Andrews carted sand and shingle to the railhead and at Timaru, off-loaded, and carted it by bullock teams to the site. It was not uncommon to see Father Tubman climbing ladders and scaffolding to check progress.

== Foundation ==
The foundation stone was laid by Bishop Grimes, assisted by Bishop Verdon of Dunedin on 6 February 1910. In a sealed receptacle beneath the stone, newspapers, coins and documents of the time were placed. A collection amounting to £1100 was taken up after the ceremony. There were many generous benefactors present, including the Mayor and Member of Parliament James Craigie, who gave ten pounds. John Cassidy of the Levels gave the foundation stone and the silver trowel used in the ceremony. Benediction was given from the site of the high altar, after a "very fine procession". Translated from Latin, the stone reads: "To the Most Sacred heart of Jesus This foundation stone was blessed and laid by the Most Rev. J. J. Grimes S.M. D.D. Bishop of Christchurch, On 6th February 1910. Parish Priest, Rev. J. Tubman S.M."

== Completion ==
It was timely that the church was completed in 1911. The wooden church had burnt down in 1910 and Mass had been celebrated in the boys’ school until the Basilica was ready. The building cost £23,000 and was practically completed and paid for by the time of the opening and consecration, on Rosary Sunday, 1 October 1911. This was an enormous effort by a relatively poor, largely Irish, Catholic community. Dignitaries who attended the consecration included Archbishop Francis Redwood of Wellington, and the three other New Zealand bishops. All the district's mayors were in attendance, being given seats of honour. The church was packed with clergy and laity. The Messe solennelle en l’honneur de Sainte-Cécile (St Cecilia Mass or Mass in G), composed by Charles Gounod, was sung by the choir of sixty, supported by a full orchestra. The sermon was preached by Bishop Cleary of Auckland. Following the blessing ceremony an unexpected honour was bestowed on Father Tubman. He was elevated to the office of Dean. The honour was a complete surprise to all in attendance. The plan of the building is cruciform. The style is Roman Renaissance of the Ionic order. Most of the material used was ferro-concrete, Oamaru stone, and locally made bricks.

== Builders ==
Sacred Heart Basilica

=== John Tubman S.M. ===
Born in Ireland in 1856, John Tubman was ordained in 1882, and taught at the Catholic University of Ireland founded by Cardinal Newman. He volunteered to teach at the new St. Patrick's College, Wellington and arrived in New Zealand in 1889. In 1893 he was appointed curate in Timaru, and in 1901 was appointed Parish Priest. He was a close friend of many South Canterbury people, especially Archdeacon Harper, later Anglican Bishop of Christchurch, and of Henry Orbell. Tubman was parish priest until 1921. The building of the basilica was a great achievement. He died in Meeanee, Hawkes Bay in 1923.

=== Bart Moriarty ===
Bart Moriarty, the surveyor contracted to supervise the construction of the basilica, later became a well-recognised builder in Melbourne, where he built a village for investment and has a street named after him. His recommendations were the basilica and other Timaru buildings he worked on. In 1915 the Archbishop of Sydney commissioned him to replace the church of St Francis Church, Paddington, Sydney. Moriarty simply replicated the Petre design in Timaru, although in Paddington only the sanctuary, transepts and sacristies were built. They are attached to the Neo Gothic nave of the original church.

== Features ==
Rear dome, interior

=== Domes ===
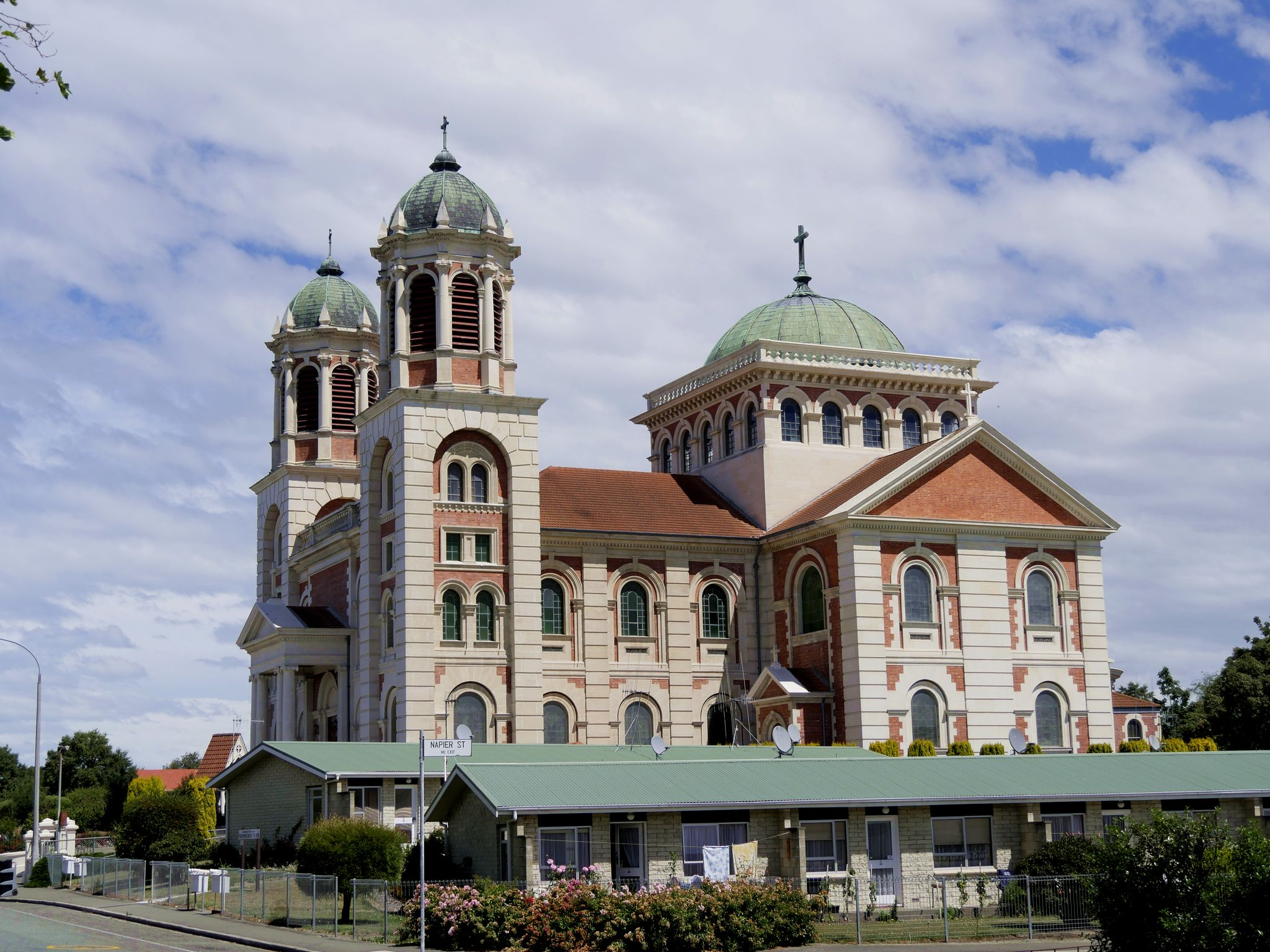
Sacred Heart Basilica north side

At the head of the nave is the internal dome, supported by Ionic columns, and buttressed by external walls. It rises to a height of 21.33 metres (70 feet) from the floor. The internal dome is one of the main artistic features, and over this dome rests the central tower out of which rises the coppered cupola (the external dome) of the church. The cupola rises to a height of 35 metres (115 feet) and is in square tower-like fashion. There is a walk-round base from which, on a clear day, can be seen Aoraki / Mount Cook, and with the aid of binoculars, Temuka and Geraldine. The dome is 12.19 metres (40 feet) at the base. Access to the space between the internal dome and cupola is gained by a concrete spiral staircase. A wooden staircase leads to the outer dome. The interior was retimbered at the time of the Basilica's Silver Jubilee in 1936 as "Sufficient care was not taken during the building." The copper for this dome alone cost £600. Two small domes surmount the towers that flank the façade and there is another internal dame above the sanctuary centring the apse of the basilica.

=== Bell Towers ===
The north east tower houses a peal of scale C bells. They are named, starting at the top of the scale: Patrick, Thomas, Henry, Michael, John, Francis, Mary and Nicholas after the children of Nicholas Quinn who gave a bequest of £300 towards their cost. They were cast by the celebrated English firm of John Warner & Sons, at a cost of £1000. The heaviest, Nicholas, weighs nearly a tonne. They were installed in July 1914, blessed by the Reverend Dean Hills on Sunday 12 July 1914 and first rung on 26 July 1914. They were originally played every hour, until complaints were received from the nurses’ home. Night nurses, trying to sleep during the day, were being kept awake. A popular hymn played was Faith of Our Fathers, at that time a very popular Catholic hymn (by Father Faber). The bells were at one time rung by an electric keyboard, but this proved unsatisfactory. Access to the campanile is by the south tower, a cast iron spiral staircase leading from the choir loft.

=== Sanctuary ===
The high altar was installed in 1912. It is of alabaster and was selected from many designs submitted from leading marble works throughout the world. It is of Italian renaissance design, having a circular tabernacle with a brass sliding door, which is surmounted by a mosaic dome. It cost £1000. Of particular beauty, behind the altar, is the semi-circular colonnade of 13 graceful Ionic columns representing St Paul and the Twelve Apostles. The floor of the sanctuary is decorated with mosaic tiles while the windows are adorned with attractive stained glass. On the south side near the sanctuary is the sacristy, which has a tiled floor, and colonial kauri fittings. It was partially destroyed by fire in 1934. The altar boys were blamed! Insurance of £211.11.06 was claimed. The brass sanctuary lamp was presented by Mrs C Byrne of Pleasant Point, at Christmas 1911.

=== Baptistry ===
Located beneath the north tower, the baptistry contains a marble and brass font, as well as the rope used to toll the bell named Nicholas. Entry to the baptistry is through brass gates originally installed at the altar rails. The baptistry features a stained glass window depicting the Baptism of Jesus, which serves as a war memorial and is known as the "Memorial window".

=== Art ===
The statues of the Sacred Heart and St Patrick are by the Bernadine Statuary Company, New York. The statue of St Peter Chanel is by Pelligrini of Melbourne, Victoria. The print of the Madonna, Madonna della Sedia, is taken from the original by Raphael, which hangs in the Pitti Palace in Florence. The original roofing tiles from Marseille, France, were transported to New Zealand as ship's ballast. They were replaced in 1985 at a cost of $19,000. The floor tiles were imported from England. Hampton's studio of Christchurch was commissioned to make the Stations of the Cross, which were solemnly erected on 26 September 1967. They are of carved plaster with 70mm relief, and bronzed over lightly to give good outline of the figures. They have a flat gold mosaic background, and cost £50 each.

=== Reordering ===
The liturgical reforms of the Second Vatican Council brought with them changes and controversy. The marble altar ceased to be used for Mass from 1965. The level of the sanctuary floor was raised in 1982. The main features of the sanctuary are the Altar, Lectern, and Presidential Chair at the front of the sanctuary. One of the confessionals was altered in 1978, and two were replaced with Reconciliation Rooms (for face-to-face confessions) in 1981.

=== Glass ===
Installed between 1911 and Silver Jubilee in 1936, the windows are "some of New Zealand’s finest." Before their installation the windows, which number over 100, were glazed with cathedral glass. The creators of the windows and their windows were:

- F.X. Zettler, Munich, Germany (on the north side of the Basilica - St Joseph's altar): the Sermon on the Mount, Christ the Good Shepherd, the Annunciation and the Nativity.
- H. Credington, Catholic Art Gallery Melbourne (above the altar): the Crucifixion and the Coronation of Our Lady.
- Matheson and Gibson, Melbourne (on south side of the Basilica – Our Lady's altar): Calming the waters, Loaves and Fishes, Presentation in the Temple, The finding the child Jesus in the temple.
- James Watson and Son, Éire (nave windows): St Margaret Mary, St Therese, St Ita, St Michael, St Matthew, St Vincent de Paul, St Colmcille (Columba). "To the 'purist' the superb Irish glass in these seven windows make them the pick of all the windows in the church."
- John Hardman and Company, Birmingham (baptistry) John the Baptist (memorial window) and the Sanctuary windows: St Aloysius, St Bridget, St Patrick, Mother Immaculate, Sacred heart, St Joseph, St Anne, St John the Evangelist.

The donors and those commemorated by the windows are named on marble tablets at the head of the nave, and in other parts of the Basilica.

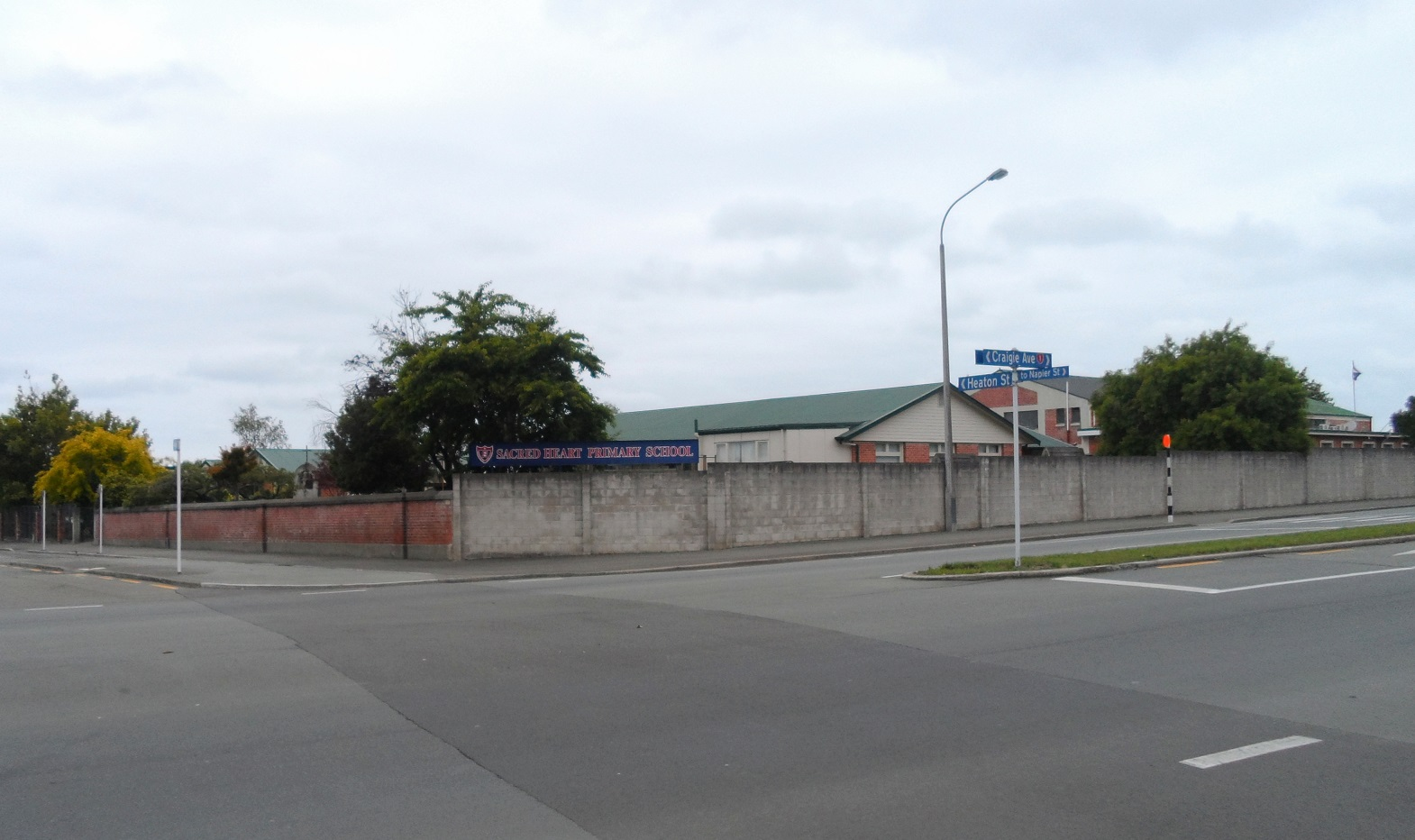
The neighbouring Sacred Heart Primary School, directly opposite across Craigie St

=== Organ ===
The organ built by Arthur Hobday, and installed in this church in 1912, was Hobday's last work before his death. He was apprenticed to the prominent nineteenth-century Australian organbuilder, George Fincham, about 1866, and later sent up his own organbuilding business in Wellington. He died on 9 October 1912, at the age of sixty-one. Internal evidence suggests that this organ is a rebuild (and enlargement) of a previous instrument, made in England in 1848 and sent to Sydney, New South Wales. It was originally powered by bellows worked by an hydraulic system. An open pipe carried the water out on to the church grounds. The present organ makes use of pipework from an older instrument. John Stiller in his 1981 documentation of this organ, states that it is the "finest of the Hobday organs which have been preserved." Excellent tonal qualities are enhanced by a splendid acoustic and visual setting. The Hobday case has been preserved in original form, and displays design characteristics typical of his style and also the console has been retained and includes original fittings such as stopknobs, stop labels, keyboards, keyboard cheeks, pedal-board and organ bench. The pneumatic action of the organ is a unique feature. The organ was restored in 1986 by the South Island Organ Company. It now has 1516 pipes. They range from sixteen feet to a quarter of an inch, and are made from wood, tin-lead and zinc. In that restoration the front pipes were altered in colour from silver to gold, and springs were added to the pneumatic actions to improve the organ's responsiveness. The 1986 restoration cost $70,000.

== Seismic strengthening ==
The basilica was closed for two years for seismic strengthening and was reopened on 8 November 2020 by Bishop Paul Martin SM of Christchurch with a Mass concelebrated with Father Christopher Friel, the parish priest, Father Brian Fennessy (his predecessor) and Father Do Nguyen, an assistant priest in the parish, and in the presence of 560 people. In addition to earthquake strengthening, the basilica was also fitted with a new heating system as well as a new sound system.

== See also ==
- Roman Catholic Diocese of Christchurch
- Roncalli College
