= St Patrick's Basilica, Waimate =

St Patrick's Basilica
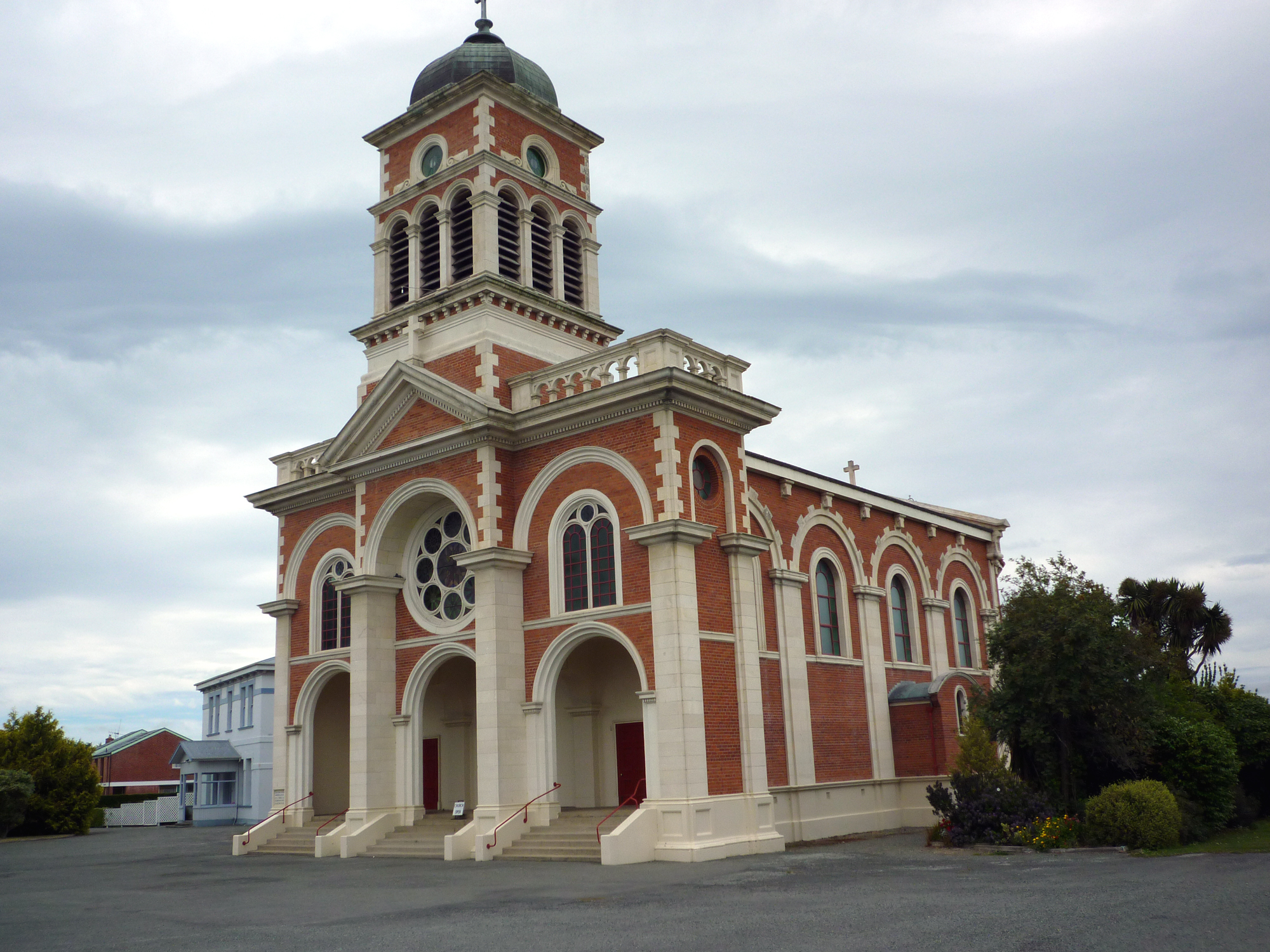
- St Patrick's Basilica, Waimate
- St Patrick's Basilica
- 44.7308°S 171.0515°E
- Location: Waimate, South Canterbury
- Country: New Zealand
- Denomination: Catholic
- Website: St Patrick's Basilica, Waimate

History
- Founded: 1874
- Dedication: St Patrick
- Dedicated: 1909

Architecture
- Functional status: parish church
- Architect: Francis Petre
- Architectural type: Palladian Revival
- Style: Roman Renaissance
- Groundbreaking: 1908
- Completed: 1909 (tower completed 1912)

Administration
- Province: Wellington
- Diocese: Christchurch
- Parish: St Patrick's

Heritage New Zealand – Category 1
- Designated: 25 October 1996
- Reference no.: 7343

St Patrick's Basilica is a church in Waimate in New Zealand's Canterbury Region, known for its style of architecture. It is an Italianate-Romanesque style with an arcaded portico, and the tower is impressively louvred. The church was built in 1908–1909, with the tower added in 1912. The basilica is listed by Heritage New Zealand as a Historic Place, Category 1.

The basilica was built to a design by Francis William Petre and has been described as his most original work. The church was designed to seat 600 people. It is constructed of concrete reinforced with iron hoops in some parts and with steel bands and rods in others, covered by faces of brick, and Oamaru stone is used in piers, mouldings and for facing some walls. Inside the church, there is a pipe organ, a marble altar and a notable sanctuary window.

== Tower and bells ==
The tower was included in Petre's original design but was not built until 1912, when sufficient funds had been raised for its construction. The tower is 45ft high, reaching 93ft above ground level. At the top of the tower is an octagonal copper-clad dome and a cross. The tower holds a peal of three bells donated by Nicholas Quinn of Makikihi, who left £400 for the bells and other "church purposes" in his 1902 will. Quinn died in 1903 and there is a memorial tablet to him inside the church. The bells were made by the firm of Farnier Fils, of Velars sur Ouche, France. Farnier Fils was a company that had been making bells for over 200 years, in Dijon and Velars sur Ouche. The bells arrived in Waimate on 22 August 1913 and were installed and in use by late September 1913. The largest bell weighs 16 cwt (812 kg), the middle one 9 cwt (457 kg), and the smallest 6 cwt (304 kg).

== Windows ==
There is a rose window 14 ft (4.2 m) wide above the main entrance. More stained glass windows were added to the church as funds allowed. In 1922 three windows were installed by the altar in the sanctuary. They were donated by Mrs. Craighead (“Sacred Heart”), Mrs. Harris (“Blessed Virgin”), and Mr. John Foley (“St. Joseph”). Four more stained glass windows were added later.

== Altar ==
The original altar in the church was installed in 1921. It was made of Italian, American and Australian marble, and New Zealand Greenstone. Above the altar was a canopy or dome of white marble supported by greenstone columns. Most of the altar was removed during alterations in 1972. During restoration of the church in 2005 – 2009, parts of the original altar rails were found under the floor and rebuilt into side altar rails. The new altar in the church comes from Lewisham Hospital (later Calvary Hospital) in Christchurch.

== Organ ==
The church has a pipe organ built by Arthur Adrian Hobday (son of Arthur Hobday of Hobday and Sons, Wellington) and paid for by parishioners Patrick and Mrs Hanley from Morven. The organ was commissioned in 1915 but progress was delayed by the First World War and the organ was not opened until September 1920. It is possibly the last organ built by A. A. Hobday. The organ was originally powered by a hydraulic system but this was replaced with an electric blower in 1921. The organ was restored in 1996. The organ was named 'Hannah'.

== Restoration ==
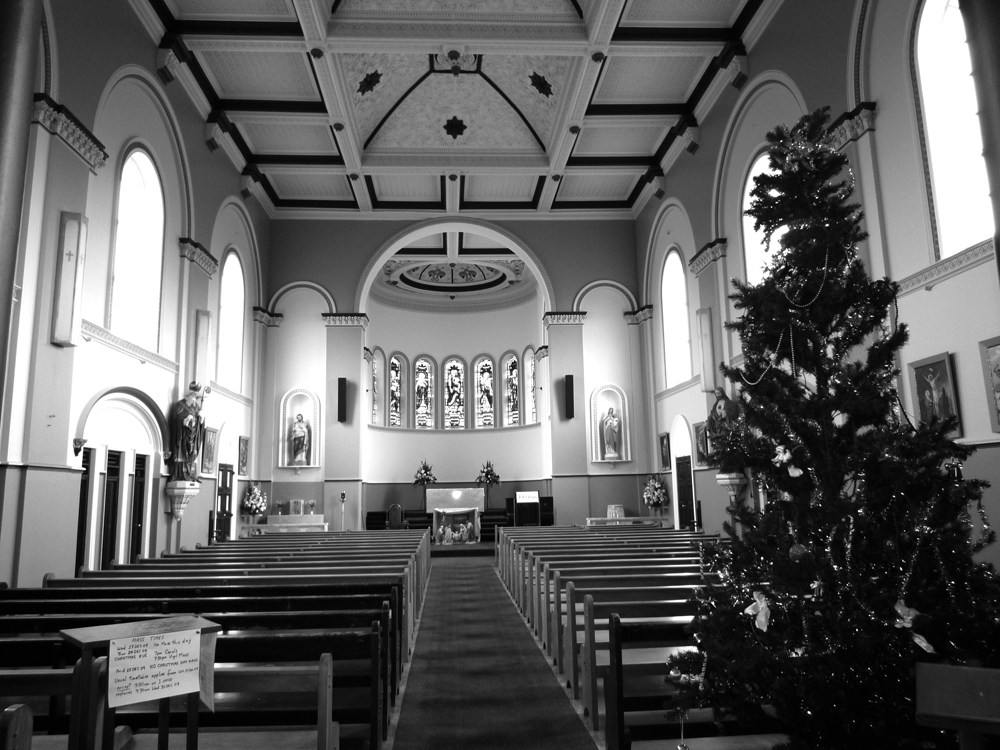
St.Patrick's Basilica, Waimate, interior

In 1972 the parish priest organised a variety of alterations to the church interior. The pulpit was removed, most of the altar was taken out, statues were removed or painted white, various objects were removed from the church and the interior was painted grey.

Many of these changes were reversed in a major restoration of the church that began in 2005, in a project lasting several years and managed by the St Patrick's Restoration Trust. Work included a new tiled roof, connecting the framing of the roof to the surrounding walls, bracing the tower, cleaning and repairing the exterior of the building, and restoration, painting and new lighting inside the church. The restoration cost $600,000. A third of the cost was paid by the Lottery Grants Board, and other charities including the Lion Foundation contributed to the project.

== See also ==
- Roman Catholic Diocese of Christchurch
