= Denzil Meuli =

New Zealand priest (1926–2019)

Pierre Denzil Meuli
- Born: September 22, 1926; New Plymouth, New Zealand
- Died: March 22, 2019 (aged 92); Auckland, New Zealand
- Education: Sacred Heart College, Auckland; St Peter's College, Auckland; St Kevin's College, Oamaru
- Alma mater: Holy Cross College, Mosgiel; Pontifical Gregorian University; Lateran University; University of Auckland
- Occupations: Writer, newspaper editor, Roman Catholic priest
- Known for: Traditionalist Catholic ministry
- Notable work: Editor of Zealandia
- Title: Reverend Doctor

Pierre Denzil Meuli (22 September 1926 – 22 March 2019) was a writer, former newspaper editor, Roman Catholic priest of the Diocese of Auckland and a leading traditionalist Catholic in New Zealand. In 1969 Meuli was appointed editor of the newspaper, Zealandia, by Archbishop Liston of Auckland in a controversial episode accompanying the profound changes to the Catholic Church in New Zealand engendered by the second Vatican Council. For nearly 30 years from 1989 he ministered to the Auckland Catholic Latin Mass community.

== Early life ==
Meuli was born in New Plymouth. He was the son of Percy Hubert and Patricia Mary Meuli (née O'Leary) and had one sister, Deirdre. He was educated in several parish schools of the Sisters of Mercy and the Sisters of St Joseph of Nazareth. He received his secondary education at Sacred Heart College, Auckland, St Peter's College, Auckland and St Kevin's College, Oamaru. From 1943 to 1945 he served with the Royal New Zealand Air Force in New Zealand. He studied for the Catholic priesthood at Holy Cross College, Mosgiel and later went to Rome to complete his studies at the International College for the Propagation of the Faith and where he was awarded the degrees of S.T.D., U.J.D., and Ph.L. He was ordained as a Priest of the Diocese of Auckland in Rome in December 1956. After ordination, Meuli spent 18 months in Germany preparing for his doctorate and was a chaplain in the Occupation Army of the Rhine. He also held chaplaincies in several parishes in France (including Neuilly-sur-Seine, Charleville-Mézières, Armentières) and at the Walburgeschule in Menden, Germany, while collecting material for his doctorate. He obtained his doctorate from the Pontifical Gregorian University in 1959 and then returned to New Zealand where he served in the parishes of Three Kings, Avondale, and Glen Eden.

== Editor of Zealandia ==
=== Dismissals ===
Zealandia was closely controlled by its founder and owner, Archbishop Liston, who did not attend the Vatican Council and expected his authoritarian management style to continue into the late 1960s. In 1962 he appointed Father Ernest Simmons as the editor and Father Patrick Murray as assistant editor. Simmon's main preoccupation was the implementation of the decrees of the Vatican Council to which he was very favourable. He criticised the Cuba blockade and the war in Vietnam. He also published a range of opinion (including dissenting material) on the papal encyclical on contraception, Humanae Vitae. This all (but especially the last matter) displeased the archbishop who dismissed Simmons as editor and transferred him to parish duties in January 1969. Father Patrick Murray, was promoted to editor in January 1969. He continued Simmon's approach. At the end of July 1969 he too was dismissed.

=== Appointment ===
Meuli was then appointed editor. Meuli's editorship marked a sharp return to a conservative, pre-Vatican II, editorial outlook. Meuli said that he was "not interested" in dissenting views, and that, in attempting to "render more profound Catholic knowledge of the faith", editing a Catholic newspaper could be likened "to preaching or administering the sacraments". These views were reflected in his first editorial page where he dismissed talk of the Rights of the Press as "so much cant and claptrap", and urged readers to "think of Zealandia" as "simply an unusual kind of parish and yourself as its parishioners". Meuli's editorials were more traditionally apologetic and less concerned with social issues. He took more combative positions on issues like abortion. At the same time he reactivated the anti-Communist crusade and used publications including those of B. A. Santamaria given to him by Liston.

=== Reaction ===
Reports in Zealandia, under Meuli, attempted to describe Murray's assignment to parish duties as "ordinary clerical change". But this was not the way that the Catholic community viewed the situation, especially following so closely the dismissal of Simmons. Murray publicly denied that his resignation was voluntary. There were unprecedented, and widely reported, scenes of protest. Catholic university students, led by Brian Lythe, organised a "Pray-in" at St Patrick's Cathedral to protest at Murray's dismissal. 120 people, led by the lawyer M E (Maurice) Casey, demonstrated outside the archbishop's residence in New Street, Ponsonby. (One of the placards read 'Simmons, Murray, Meuli?'). Across the street from them a counter-demonstration of about 80 people, led by Dr. H. P. Dunn, supported the archbishop's action.

=== Consequences ===
Most of the editorial staff of Zealandia and most regular contributors resigned. One of the departing staff (Pat McCarthy) spent his two weeks' notice instructing Meuli (who had no experience in journalism) in the mechanics of production. Meuli stated that he expected the "walls to cave in" when McCarthy left. Without the regular sources of copy, at first Meuli had to use "padding" such as commercial "advertorial" material. Clerical speeches were printed in full, as were ecclesiastical documents. Slowly Meuli rebuilt the staff. Paradoxically, because of the absence of informed Catholic staff, the newspaper began, amidst the prevailing conservative editorial outlook, to address lively social issues outside the church. Mueli also instituted a correspondence column from 28 August 1969, the first such column the paper had ever had. The newspaper suffered a major drop in circulation in late 1969. But by mid 1971, the situation had improved and Zealandia had regained much of its old readership.

=== Replacement ===
Archbishop Liston submitted his resignation to the Pope at the age of 88 in December 1969, on the 40th anniversary of his succession as Bishop of Auckland. He stepped down in early 1970 and was replaced by his auxiliary bishop, Reginald John Delargey who on 27 May 1971 announced the appointment of a new editor for the newspaper, Pat Booth.

== Civil and Canon Lawyer ==
In 1977, Meuli obtained an LL.B. from the University of Auckland and was admitted as a barrister and solicitor of the High Court of New Zealand (as it later became). In 1980 he graduated from the Lateran University in Canon Law and Civil Law as Doctor in Utroque Jure, Summa Cum Laude. His thesis was titled "The status and defences of the unborn child in common law". Further studies followed and he was licensed to appear before the Sacred Roman Rota and the Apostolic Signatura. In the early 1980s he worked with the regional tribunal in Bologna, Italy, as Defender of the Bond.

== Traditionalist ministry ==
In 1987 he studied the work of Patrick Henry Omlor and his questioning of the validity of the Novus Ordo Mass using the all-English Canon, particularly the replacement of the Latin "Pro multis" ("for many") with the English "for all" in the rite of consecration. Omlor argued that a deviation from the earlier wording resulted in the new Mass not constituting a proper sacrifice. Meuli was influenced by Omlor's arguments and resumed the celebration of the Mass in Latin. In 1989 Denis Browne, the tenth Bishop of Auckland, made a small church available to Meuli and this became the centre of the Mount St. Mary "non-geographic" parish, Titirangi, where the "traditional Latin liturgy" is followed. His congregation came from all over the greater Auckland region to worship in the pre- Vatican II manner. Meuli published an English translation of a sermon by Don Stefano Gobbi, an Italian priest and visionary. He took a public lead on some moral issues. In 2016 Meuli retired and was succeeded as the pastor of Mt St Mary by Father Antony Sumich FSSP.

Meuli, along with National Party MP John Banks, requested for the controversial artwork Virgin in a Condom (displayed at Te Papa in 1998) a prosecution for blasphemous libel under the Crimes Act, but the Solicitor General refused the case citing ‘the principle of freedom of expression'.

== Death ==
Meuli died in Auckland on 22 March 2019, aged 92 years. The well-attended requiem Mass was celebrated at the Church of the Holy Family, Te Atatū, on 27 March 2019 in Latin in the extraordinary form by Father Michael-Mary Sim FSSR (Rector-Major of the Congregation of the Sons of the Most Holy Redeemer) with Fr Antony Sumich as deacon and Fr Jeremy Palman as subdeacon. Antony Sumich preached the panegyric in which Meuli was described as a counter to the dissent which had followed the publication, in 1968, of Pope Paul VI's encyclical, Humanae Vitae. Amongst other personal details, mention was made of Meuli's love of classic cars - in Glen Eden he had possessed two Monaros and a Jaguar. Bishop Patrick Dunn of Auckland and Bishop Denis Brown, former Bishop of Auckland, were present at the funeral. Meuli was buried at Panmure Catholic Cemetery.

== See also ==
- Roman Catholicism in New Zealand
- Felix Donnelly - a near contemporary Auckland priest who had a completely different basis for dissent.
