= Francis Redwood =

New Zealand Roman Catholic Archbishop

Francis William Redwood
- Roman Catholic Archbishop of Wellington
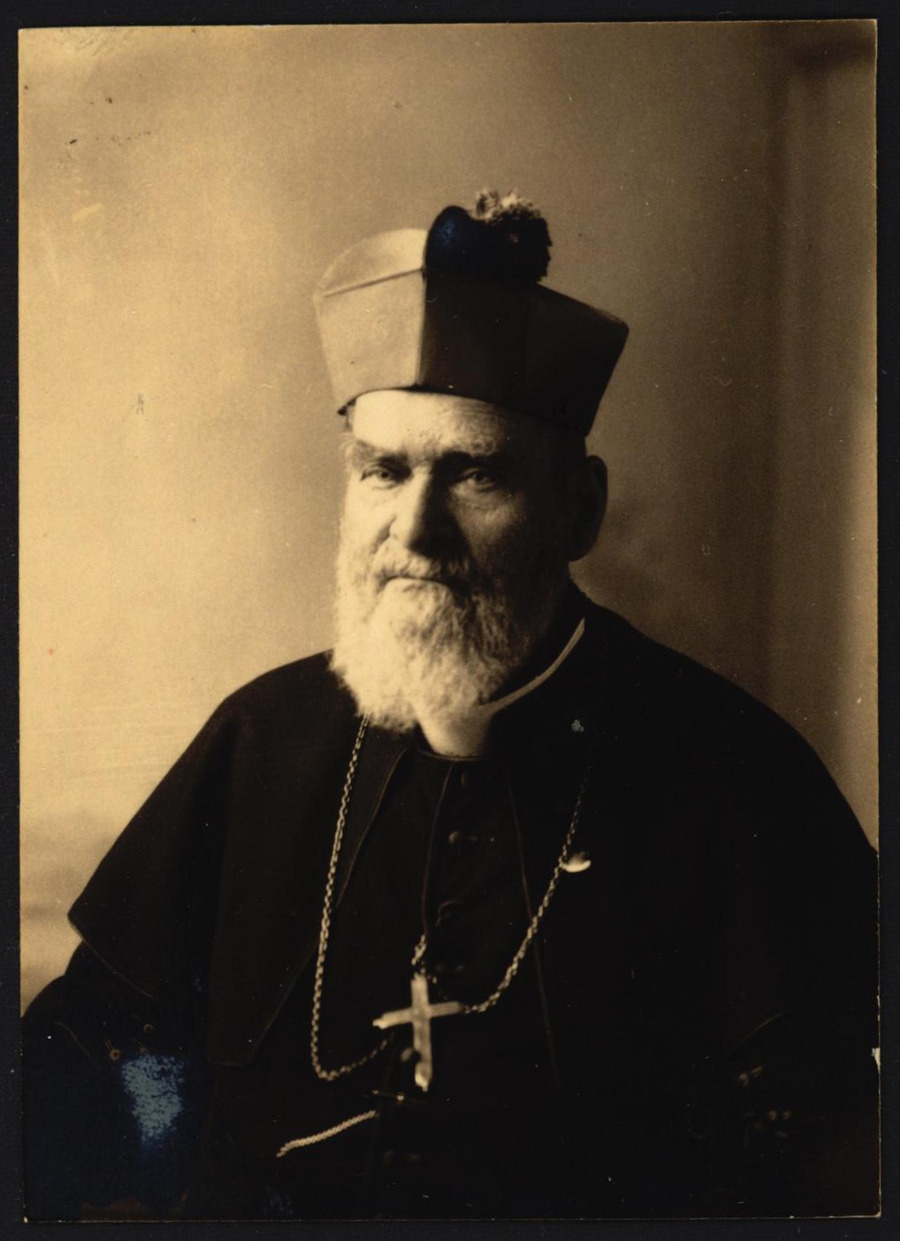
- Redwood in 1932

Personal details
- Born: Francis William Redwood; 8 April 1839 Tixall, England
- Died: 3 January 1935 (aged 95) Wellington, New Zealand
- Buried: Karori Cemetery
- Denomination: Catholicism

Francis William Mary Redwood SM (8 April 1839 – 3 January 1935), was the first Roman Catholic Archbishop of Wellington, Metropolitan of New Zealand.

He became Bishop of Wellington in 1874; he was created Archbishop of Wellington in 1887.

== Life ==
Redwood was born on 8 April 1839 on the Tixall estate, Staffordshire, England, a known historical Catholic centre. His parents were Henry Redwood and his wife Mary (née Gilbert). In 1842, he sailed to New Zealand with his parents, siblings (including his brother Henry and his brother in law Joseph Ward) on the George Fyfe.

His father had bought land from the New Zealand Company, and the family settled in Waimea West in the Nelson district. The locality became known as Appleby and his parents had Stafford Place built in 1866. The house is registered as a Category I heritage building by Heritage New Zealand, with registration number 1678.

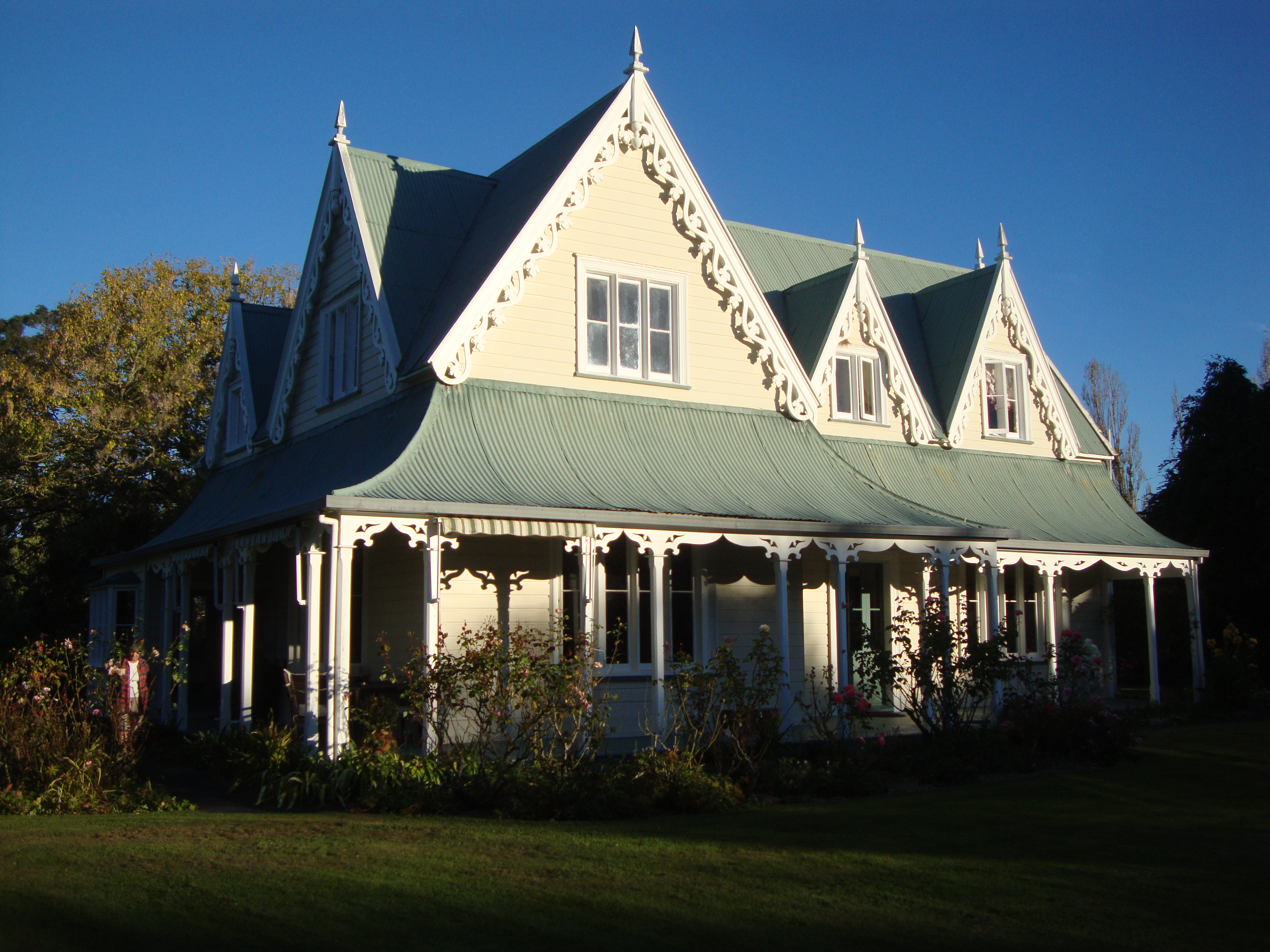
Stafford Place, the home of Henry Redwood and family

Redwood was educated at the Nelson school of Fr Antoine Garin, SM. In December 1854 he went to study at St Mary's College at St Chamond, near Lyon, France, and in 1860 he entered the scholasticate of the Society of Mary (Marists) at Montbel, near Toulon. He entered the Marist novitiate at Sainte-Foy. He was ordained priest at Maynooth in 1865 and gained his baccalaureate in theology at Dublin.

After three years of teaching at Catholic University School, Redwood suffered a near fatal bout of pneumonia in 1867 and went to Lyon to convalesce. There he met Philippe Viard, Bishop of Wellington, who was going to Rome to discuss his diocese and later to attend the First Vatican Council. Viard was impressed and even perhaps thought of Redwood as his coadjutor. However, before any appointment could be made, Viard died. There was a long delay before Redwood was appointed his successor in January 1874..

Redwood was consecrated by Henry Edward Cardinal Manning at St Anne's, Spitalfields, London, on 17 March 1874. Redwood spent his time appealing for funds in France and personnel in Ireland before returning to New Zealand in November 1874. When consecrated second Bishop of Wellington, Redwood was the youngest Roman Catholic bishop in the world. At his death, aged 95, he was said to be the oldest. The overwhelming size of the Wellington diocese led to the decision to create a new diocese comprising Canterbury and Westland.

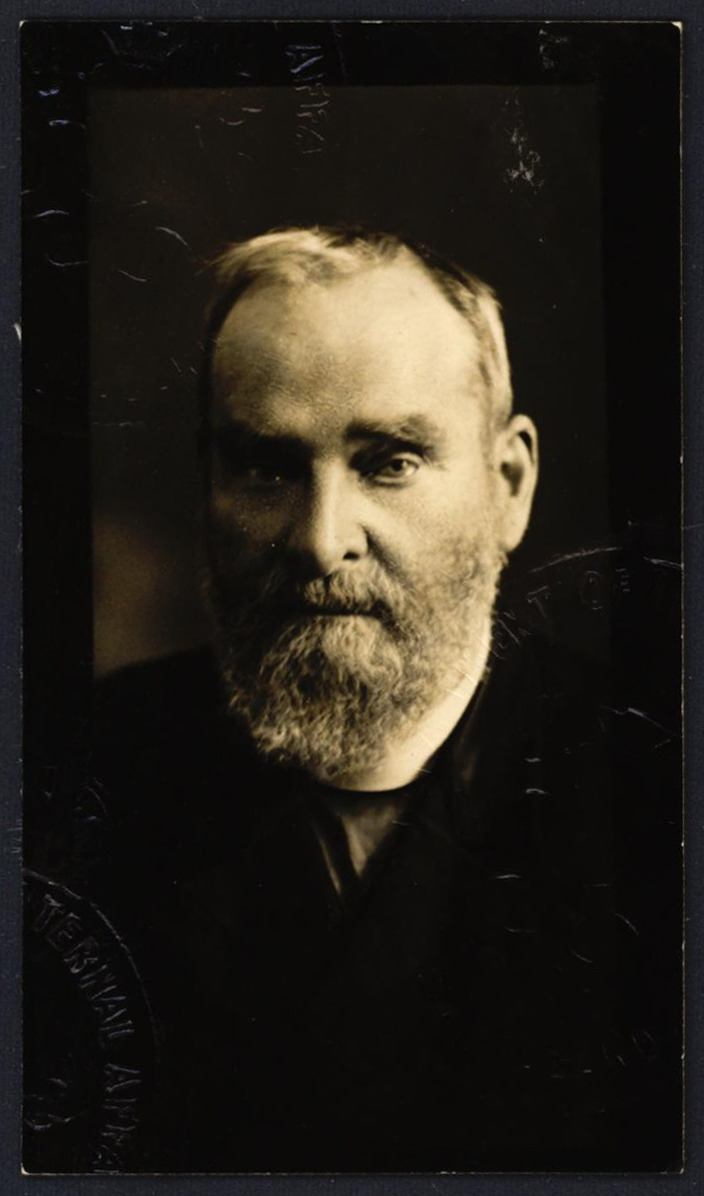
Francis Redwood passport photo (1926)

At the same time a metropolitan archdiocese was created. Redwood favoured the appointment of his fellow Marist John Grimes, who was English-born, as Bishop of Christchurch, but in 1885 the first plenary council of Australasian bishops recommended that the appointment go to a diocesan priest and that Dunedin be the new archdiocese. This would have strengthened the largely Irish diocesan clergy at the expense of the Marists, who successfully petitioned Rome to overturn both recommendations. In 1887, Grimes became bishop of Christchurch and Redwood archbishop of Wellington and metropolitan of New Zealand. Redwood was created archbishop by a papal brief dated 13 May 1887.

Redwood attached great importance to personal visitation. He established numerous churches, hospitals, and orphanages, was a founder of St Patrick's College, Wellington in 1885, and lived to open the new St Patrick's College, Silverstream in 1931 in the Hutt Valley. He expanded and completed St Mary's Cathedral and, after it was destroyed, replaced it with a basilican church which eventually became Sacred Heart Cathedral.

During his episcopate, Redwood invited many religious orders into New Zealand, notable among these being the Sisters of Mercy, the Marist Brothers, the Little Company of Mary, the Sisters of the Sacred Heart, the Sisters of St Brigid, the Sisters of the Mission, and the Sisters of St Joseph. He also encouraged the foundation of the New Zealand order, the Sisters of Compassion. Redwood was also Provincial of the New Zealand Marists. He founded the Seminary in Hawke's Bay and lent his support to the foundation of Holy Cross College, Mosgiel.

For 26 years (1877–1903), he served on the Senate of the University of New Zealand where he played an active part in its proceedings. He became the first life member of the Early Settlers' and Historical Society, Wellington.

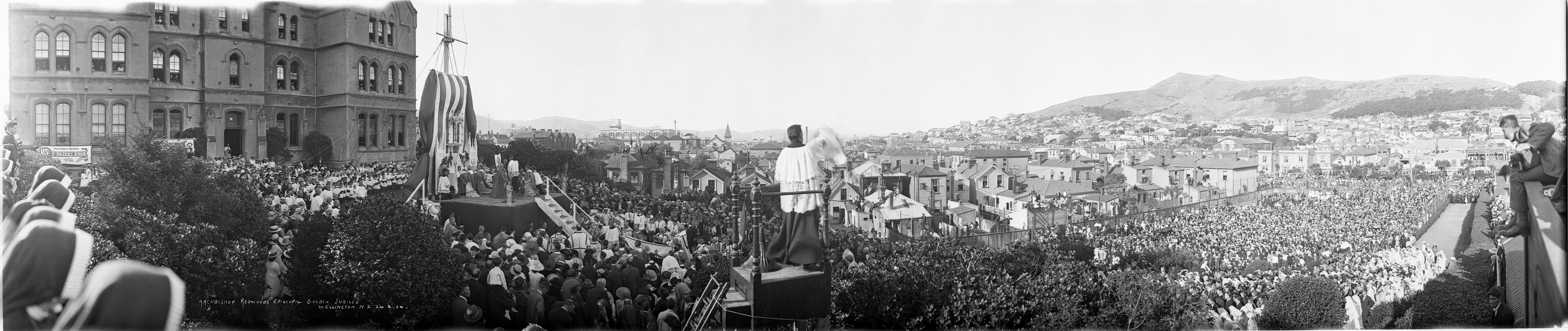
Archbishop Redwood's Episcopal Golden Jubilee, Wellington, 24 February 1924

Redwood's concerns extended to all aspects of life. He agreed that alcohol was one of the evils of the day, but advocated temperance rather than prohibition. He resolutely resisted pressure to support prohibition, and a pastoral letter of 1911 urging Catholics to vote against prohibition was widely believed to have been responsible for the defeat of the measure in that year.

At the Diocesan Synod, in 1878, Redwood framed the practical Canon law for the New Zealand Church. His Statutes provided a pattern later followed by the Auckland and Dunedin dioceses. He convened and presided over the first Provincial (Ecclesiastical) Council of Wellington (1899), and played a prominent role in the first Plenary Council of Sydney (1885).

Archbishop Redwood died at Wellington on 3 January 1935, aged 95. He was succeeded by Archbishop Thomas O'Shea SM, Coadjutor-Archbishop since 1913.

== List of honours ==
- Chevalier de la Légion d'honneur (France) – 1934

Catholic Church titles
Preceded by Philippe Viard SM	2nd Bishop of Wellington; 1874–1887	Succeeded by New Title
Preceded by New title	1st Archbishop of Wellington; 1887–1935	Succeeded by Thomas O'Shea SM
