= John Dew (cardinal) =

New Zealander Catholic archbishop (born 1948)

His Eminence John Dew
- Archbishop Emeritus of Wellington
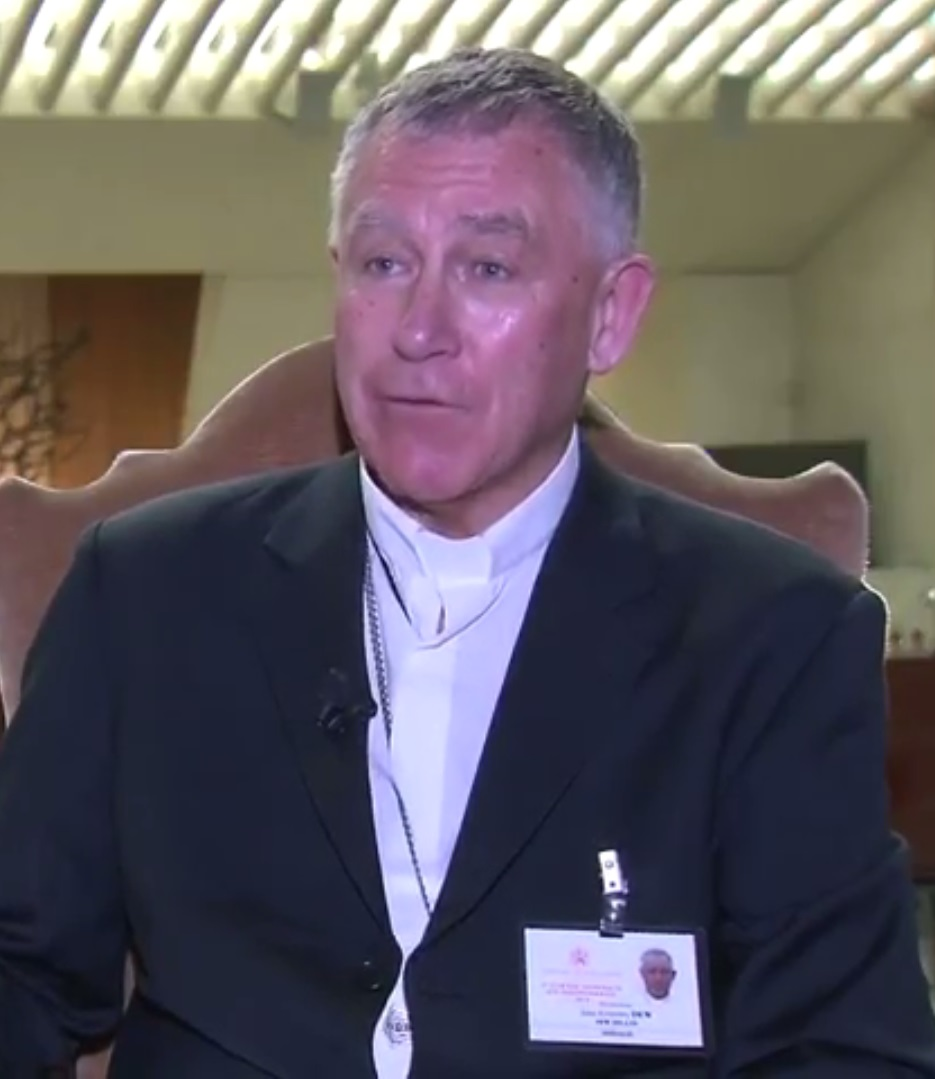
- Dew in 2014
- Church: Catholic Church
- Archdiocese: Wellington
- Appointed: 24 May 2004 (coadjutor)
- Installed: 21 March 2005
- Term ended: 5 May 2023
- Predecessor: Thomas Williams
- Successor: Paul Martin
- Other post: Cardinal-Priest of Sant'Ippolito
- Previous posts: Auxiliary Bishop of Wellington (1995–2004); Titular Bishop of Privata (1995–2004); Bishop of the Military Ordinariate of New Zealand (2005–2023)

Orders
- Ordination: 9 May 1976 by Reginald Delargey
- Consecration: 31 May 1995 by Thomas Williams
- Created cardinal: 14 February 2015 by Pope Francis
- Rank: Cardinal Priest

Personal details
- Born: 5 May 1948 (age 78) Waipawa, New Zealand
- Motto: Peace through Integrity
- Coat of arms: John Dew's coat of arms

Styles of John Atcherley Dew
- Reference style: His Eminence
- Spoken style: Your Eminence
- Religious style: Cardinal
- Informal style: Cardinal

Ordination history of John Dew
History
Priestly ordination
- Date: 9 May 1976
Episcopal consecration
- Principal consecrator: Thomas Stafford Williams
- Co-consecrators: Denis George Browne Peter James Cullinane
- Date: 31 May 1995
Cardinalate
- Elevated by: Pope Francis
- Date: 14 February 2015

John Atcherley Dew (born 5 May 1948) is a New Zealand Catholic bishop. He was the sixth Archbishop of Wellington and the Metropolitan of New Zealand, serving from 2005 until 2023. He was also created a cardinal by Pope Francis in 2015.

== Background ==
Dew was born in Waipawa, the son of George and Joan Dew. He has two sisters. He attended St. Joseph's Primary School in Waipukurau (staffed by the Sisters of St Joseph of Nazareth) and St Joseph's College, Masterton (staffed by the Marist Brothers). He then went to the Marist Brothers Juniorate in Tuakau for a short time.

After about a year working at the Bank of New Zealand in Waipukurau, Anderson's Nurseries in Napier and studying horticulture, he commenced his studies for the priesthood at Holy Name Seminary, Christchurch, where he studied philosophy under Jesuit professors for two years and then for five years he studied Theology at Holy Cross Seminary, Mosgiel, under the Vincentians. He played rugby union for the Holy Cross Seminary team in the position of prop.

== Early ministry ==
Dew was ordained priest at Waipukurau by Cardinal Reginald Delargey in May 1976. He was appointed as an assistant priest in St Joseph's Parish, Upper Hutt, 1976–79. He served in the Cook Islands in the Diocese of Rarotonga from 1980 until 1982. He returned to Wellington. From 1983 to 1987 he had responsibility for the Archdiocesan Youth Ministry and the Cook Islands Māori Community.

=== Seminary director ===
Dew was on the staff of Holy Cross College, Mosgiel, the New Zealand national seminary, from 1988 to 1991. He was director of a special programme focussing on human development and gave a general introduction to first year students on prayer, scripture and the Church. He also led small groups of students ("moderator groups") who met regularly for prayer and discussion.

During his time at the seminary a major concern related to the selection of seminarians. In his 1991 First Year Moderators Report, Dew expressed a real sense of frustration at the unsuitability of many students. He pointed out that "we at the Seminary can work only with those who are sent to us." Many, he suggested, were sent with unresolved issues relating to identity, sexuality and alcohol. Such students placed a heavy burden on staff and had a negative impact upon other students and group dynamics. Dew urged that in the future, diocesan vocations directors pay particular attention to eight issues with evaluating prospective students: basic knowledge of the Catholic faith; familiarity with meditation, prayer and the scriptures; a reasonable comfort with affectivity; personal independence; social comfort; intellectual curiosity; generosity; and a genuine desire and free decision to enter the seminary.

=== Parish priest ===
Dew studied spirituality at the Institute of St Anselm, Kent, England, from 1991 to 1992. Upon his return to New Zealand he was appointed the parish priest at St Anne's Parish, Newtown, a post he held from 1993 to 1995.

== Episcopal ministry ==
He was appointed as auxiliary bishop for the Wellington archdiocese on 31 May 1995 at the age of 47. The news of his appointment had been announced to a large congregation at the Chrism Mass on 12 April. "The news was greeted with prolonged and enthusiastic applause." Because Sacred Heart Cathedral would not have held the expected congregation, he was consecrated bishop in the Wellington Town Hall which was filled to capacity. He took as his motto "Peace through Integrity". He became the Secretary of the New Zealand Catholic Bishops' Conference and acted as New Zealand Bishops' Conference representative on the National Council for Young Catholics.

=== Archbishop of Wellington ===
Dew was appointed Coadjutor Archbishop of Wellington on 24 May 2004 by Pope John Paul II. He succeeded Thomas Stafford Williams as Archbishop of Wellington on 21 March 2005.

Dew attended the Synod of Bishops on "The Eucharist: Source and Summit of the Life and Mission of the Church" in October 2005 (see below). In 2012 he was appointed by Pope Benedict XVI to serve as a Synod father for the October 2012 Synod of Bishops on "The New Evangelization for the Transmission of the Christian Faith".

He was the "relator" for one of the large English-speaking groups in the 2014 Third Extraordinary General Assembly of the Synod of Bishops on the Pastoral Challenges of the Family in the Context of Evangelization, and he said he got to know Pope Francis "a little better" during that 2014 synod.

Dew is President of the New Zealand Catholic Bishops' Conference, Bishop of the Military Ordinariate of New Zealand, Bishops' conference Deputy for the National Committee for Professional Standards and for Finance, and Moderator of the Tribunal. In 2015 he completed a term as President of the Federation of Catholic Bishops' Conferences of Oceania (FCBCO) which comprises all the bishops of New Zealand, Australia, Papua New Guinea, the Solomons and the CEPAC bishops of the Pacific Islands.

Pope Francis accepted Dew's resignation on his 75th birthday, 5 May 2023 on which date he was succeeded by Paul Martin, his coadjutor archbishop. His resignation as head of the Military Ordinate of New Zealand was accepted on 27 May.

=== Cardinal ===
On 14 February 2015, Pope Francis made Dew a member of the College of Cardinals with the title of Cardinal-Priest of Sant'Ippolito. John L. Allen Jr., in commenting on the appointment, described Dew as a "high profile moderate" in the Catholic Church. He became the fourth New Zealand cardinal, joining Thomas Williams, who was no longer eligible to participate in a papal conclave. Their predecessors as cardinals from New Zealand were Reginald Delargey and Peter McKeefry.

Recalling a few weeks later how he received the news he was being made a cardinal, he said: "Since then I have received nothing but love and support, messages of congratulation. By 7am, in my first radio interview for the day, I happened to say 'I am an ordinary Kiwi bloke.' Since then the words have been repeated back to me often, but I [still] believe this to be true."

On 13 April 2015, Dew was appointed a member of the Congregation for the Evangelization of Peoples and of the Pontifical Council for Promoting Christian Unity. He participated in the Fourteenth Ordinary General Assembly of the Synod of Bishops (4–25 October 2015) on "The vocation and mission of the family in the Church and in the contemporary world". On 28 October 2016, was appointed a member of the Congregation for Divine Worship and the Discipline of the Sacraments.

Dew participated as a cardinal elector in the 2025 papal conclave that elected Pope Leo XIV.

== Approach ==
=== Eucharist ===
Dew achieved some prominence at the Synod of Bishops on "The Eucharist: Source and Summit of the Life and Mission of the Church" at the Vatican in October 2005 when he proposed that divorced and remarried Catholics should be able to receive the Eucharist. He said that bishops have "a pastoral duty and an obligation before God to discuss and debate the question." He urged the assembly to reconsider the Church ban, referring to it as a "source of scandal", adding "Our Church would be enriched if we were able to invite dedicated Catholics, currently excluded from the Eucharist, to return to the Lord's Table." After this 2005 speech, Dew discussed the issue with Cardinal Jorge Mario Bergoglio, the future Pope Francis.

=== Welcoming and accepting ===
Dew has also said, "what's the point in judging people and condemning them, but to make it clear what the church says but in such a way that you are welcoming and accepting." "When church teaching is explained in such a way that it says to people they're intrinsically disordered or they're living an evil life, people feel they can't meet the mark rather than it being something helping, supportive and encouraging."

=== Curia ===
In relation to Curia reform, Dew has said that he "would like to see ... local communities and diocesan bishops being able to dialogue with curial bishops in a way that truly reflects collegiality" and that the "Curia is to be at the service of the church and her people."

=== Climate and trafficking ===
In February 2015, Dew said he and Soane Patita Paini Mafi of Tonga, who was soon to become a cardinal alongside him, wanted to highlight two issues: the effect of climate change and the resulting sea level rise on the countries of the South Pacific and the problem of human trafficking in that part of the world.

=== LGBT community ===
Cardinal Dew responded in 2018 to the Faith and Belief in New Zealand survey, which found only a third of the country identifies as Christian, down from 43 percent in 2013 and 49 percent in 2006. The main reason given for a failure to engage with Christianity was Church teachings on homosexuality – mentioned by 47 percent of the respondents – with the doctrine of Hell closely following, at 45 percent. Dew said Church leaders have fallen short, "especially with regards to particular groups in society, such as the LGBT community, who have felt a very real sense of rejection through the Church, or perhaps in falling short in fully meeting the needs of our recent migrant communities."

=== Abuse in Care ===
On 26 March 2021, Cardinal John Dew, the Archbishop of Wellington and president of New Zealand Catholic Bishops Conference, apologized to abuse victims in the Royal Commission of Inquiry and stated that its systems and culture must change.

As part of a "ten point statement," the Catholic leadership also reiterated their support for an independent entity to investigate reports of abuse and redress as part of the Church's response to the ongoing Royal Commission of Inquiry on Abuse in Care. In response to the Catholic Church's "ten-point statement," Survivors Network of those Abused by Priests Aotearoa leader Dr Chris Longhurst accused the Church of failing to meet with survivors and of conducting a "cover-up."

== Child Sexual Abuse Allegations ==
In March 2024 a story about historical child sex offences from 1977 involving Cardinal Dew was broadcast on Newshub.

When Newshub originally attempted to air the story, Dew sought an injunction against Newshub's parent organization Warner Bros Discovery NZ to prevent Newshub's story going to air. Dew first sought the injunction in the High Court but failed. He then appealed to the Court of Appeal, again failing. He then took his case to the Supreme Court which dismissed his appeal.

Both the Vatican and NZ police closed its investigation into Dew without charges being laid.

== See also ==
- Royal Commission of Inquiry into Abuse in Care
- Catholic Church in New Zealand
- Cardinals created by Francis

Catholic Church titles
New title	— TITULAR — Titular Bishop of Privata; 1 April 1995 – 24 May 2004	Succeeded by Jérôme Beau
Preceded by Thomas Stafford Williams	Archbishop of Wellington; 21 March 2005 – 4 May 2023	Succeeded by Paul Martin
Preceded by Thomas Stafford Williams	Military Ordinary of New Zealand; 1 April 2005 – May 2023	Succeeded by Paul Martin
Preceded by Denis George Browne	President of the New Zealand Episcopal Conference; 30 October 2009 – 1 June 2016	Succeeded by Patrick James Dunn
Preceded by Peter William Ingham	President of the Federation of Catholic Bishops' Conferences of Oceania; April 2011 – 20 May 2014	Succeeded by John Ribat
New title	Cardinal-Priest of Sant'Ippolito; 14 February 2015 –	Incumbent
Preceded by	Apostolic Administrator of Palmerston North; 4 October 2019 – 22 June 2023	Succeeded by
