= Barry Jones (bishop) =

New Zealand Catholic prelate (1941–2016)

The Most Reverend Barry Jones
- 9th Bishop of Christchurch
- Diocese: Roman Catholic Diocese of Christchurch
- Installed: 4 May 2007
- Term ended: 13 February 2016
- Predecessor: John Cunneen
- Successor: Paul Martin SM

Orders
- Ordination: 4 July 1966 by Brian Ashby
- Consecration: 4 October 2006 by John Cunneen; Charles Balvo; Basil Meeking

Personal details
- Born: Barry Philip Jones; 29 September 1941 Rangiora, Canterbury, New Zealand
- Died: 13 February 2016 (aged 74) Christchurch, Canterbury, New Zealand
- Denomination: Roman Catholic Church
- Occupation: Roman Catholic bishop
- Profession: Cleric
- Education: Holy Name Seminary (Christchurch); Holy Cross Seminary College
- Motto: The Lord delights in his people

Styles of Barry Jones
- Reference style: The Most Reverend
- Spoken style: Your Excellency
- Religious style: Bishop

Barry Philip Jones (29 September 1941 – 13 February 2016) was a New Zealand prelate of the Roman Catholic Church who served as the Coadjutor Bishop of Christchurch from 2006 and then Bishop from 2007 upon the retirement of Bishop John Cunneen in 2007. Jones was bishop during the Canterbury earthquakes of 2010

== Early life and education ==
Born in Rangiora, New Zealand, in 1941, Jones received his education at St Joseph's Convent Primary and St Bede's College, Christchurch. He studied for the priesthood at Holy Name Seminary (Christchurch), and at Holy Cross Seminary College, Mosgiel.

== Priesthood ==
He was ordained a priest on 4 July 1966, aged 24, by Bishop Ashby.

== Episcopacy ==
On 28 June 2006, Jones was appointed as Coadjutor Bishop of Christchurch, and consecrated on 4 October 2006. On 4 May 2007 Jones succeeded to the position of Bishop of Christchurch on the retirement of his predecessor John Cunneen.

In 2015, he suffered a number of strokes and his health declined. He decided to step down when he turned 75. Following a heart attack, Jones died on 13 February 2016.

Catholic Church titles
Preceded by Denis Hanrahan	Coadjutor Bishop of Christchurch; 2006–2007	Succeeded by none
Preceded by John Cunneen	Bishop of Christchurch; 2007–2016	Succeeded by Paul Martin SM
