= Zealandia (newspaper) =

Defunct New Zealand tabloid newspaper

Zealandia was a New Zealand tabloid newspaper owned, and published weekly for 55 years, by the Catholic Bishop of Auckland. Its first issue is dated 10 May 1934 and its last is dated 23 April 1989. It was founded by the seventh Catholic Bishop of Auckland, James Michael Liston and even though its focus was on Catholic religious matters, well-known New Zealand writers were published in its columns such as James K. Baxter and John Reid. Its editors included Cardinal McKeefry and Bishop Owen Snedden (as they later became), the historian Father Ernest Simmonds, the later prominent traditionalist priest, Father Denzil Meuli and Pat Booth, the newspaper's first lay editor.

== Editors ==
- Peter McKeefry (1934–1948)
- Owen Snedden (1948–1962)
- Ernest Simmons (1962–1969)
- Patrick Murray (1969)
- Denzil Meuli (1969–1971)
- Pat Booth (1971–1972)

== Owner/Editor conflict 1969 ==
=== Dismissals ===
Zealandia was closely controlled by its founder and owner, Archbishop Liston, who did not attend the Vatican Council and expected his authoritarian management style to continue into the late 1960s. In 1962 he appointed Father Ernest Simmons as the editor and Father Patrick Murray as assistant editor. Simmon's main preoccupation was the implementation of the decrees of the Vatican Council to which he was very favourable. He criticised the Cuba blockade and the war in Vietnam. He also published a range of opinion (including dissenting material) on the papal encyclical on contraception, Humanae Vitae. This all (but especially the last matter) displeased the archbishop who dismissed Simmons as editor and transferred him to parish duties in January 1969. Father Patrick Murray, was promoted to editor in January 1969. He continued Simmon's approach. At the end of July 1969 he too was dismissed.

=== Appointment ===
Meuli was then appointed editor. Meuli's editorship marked a sharp return to a conservative, pre-Vatican II, editorial outlook. Meuli said that he was "not interested" in dissenting views, and that, in attempting to "render more profound Catholic knowledge of the faith", editing a Catholic newspaper could be likened "to preaching or administering the sacraments". These views were reflected in his first editorial page where he dismissed talk of the Rights of the Press as "so much cant and claptrap", and urged readers to "think of Zealandia" as "simply an unusual kind of parish and yourself as its parishioners". Meuli's editorials were more traditionally apologetic and less concerned with social issues. He took more combative positions on issues like abortion. At the same time he reactivated the anti-Communist crusade and used publications including those of B. A. Santamaria given to him by Liston.

=== Reaction ===
Reports in Zealandia, under Meuli, attempted to describe Murray's assignment to parish duties as "ordinary clerical change". But this was not the way that the Catholic community viewed the situation, especially following so closely the dismissal of Simmons. Murray publicly denied that his resignation was voluntary. There were unprecedented, and widely reported, scenes of protest. Catholic university students, led by Brian Lythe, organised a "Pray-in" at St Patrick's Cathedral to protest at Murray's dismissal. 120 people, led by the lawyer M E (Maurice) Casey, demonstrated outside the archbishop's residence in New Street, Ponsonby. (One of the placards read 'Simmons, Murray, Meuli?'). Across the street from them a counter-demonstration of about 80 people, led by Dr. H. P. Dunn, supported the archbishop's action.

=== Consequences ===
Most of the editorial staff of Zealandia and most regular contributors resigned. One of the departing staff (Pat McCarthy) spent his two weeks' notice instructing Meuli (who had no experience in journalism) in the mechanics of production. Meuli stated that he expected the "walls to cave in" when McCarthy left. Without the regular sources of copy, at first Meuli had to use "padding" such as commercial "advertorial" material. Clerical speeches were printed in full, as were ecclesiastical documents. Slowly Meuli rebuilt the staff. Paradoxically, because of the absence of informed Catholic staff, the newspaper began, amidst the prevailing conservative editorial outlook, to address lively social issues outside the church. Mueli also instituted a correspondence column from 28 August 1969, the first such column the paper had ever had. The newspaper suffered a major drop in circulation in late 1969. But by mid 1971, the situation had improved and Zealandia had regained much of its old readership.

=== Replacement ===
Archbishop Liston submitted his resignation to the Pope at the age of 88 in December 1969, on the 40th anniversary of his succession as Bishop of Auckland. He stepped down in early 1970 and was replaced by his auxiliary bishop, Reginald John Delargey who on 27 May 1971 announced the appointment of a new editor for the newspaper, Pat Booth.

== Closure ==
The last issue of the newspaper was 23 April 1989. A less frequent free publication New Zealandia existed for some years until a twice-weekly successor publication New Zealand Catholic was established by the Bishop of Auckland in 1996.

The Catholic Diocese of Auckland holds an archive of publications, including those of its replacement publication New Zealandia.

== See also ==
- Roman Catholicism in New Zealand
- Peter McKeefry
- Denzil Meuli
- Patrick Murray
- Owen Snedden
