= Pat Booth (journalist) =

New Zealand journalist (1929–2018)

Pat Booth OBE
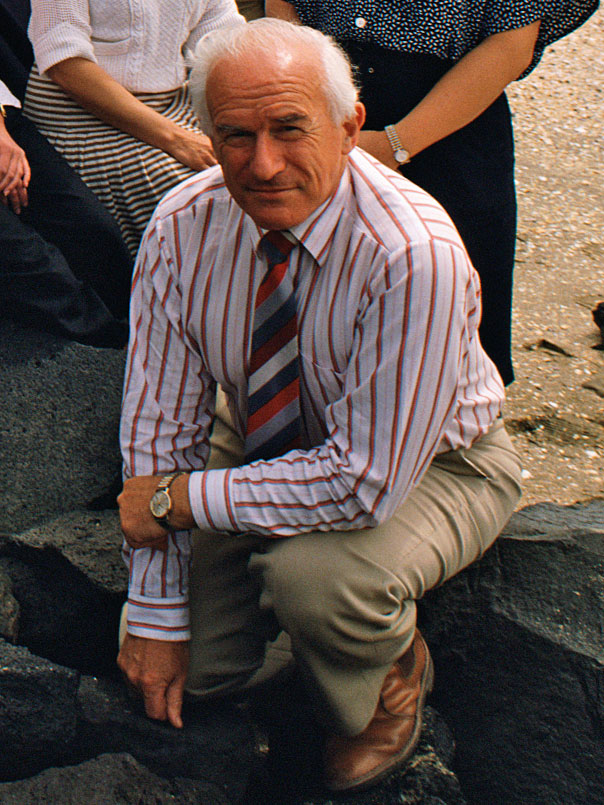
- Booth in 1988
- Born: Patrick John Booth; 9 September 1929; Levin, New Zealand
- Died: 31 January 2018 (aged 88); Kumeū, New Zealand
- Occupation: Investigative journalist
- Employer: The Auckland Star
- Known for: Investigations into the Arthur Allan Thomas case, and the Mr Asia crime syndicates; editor of Zealandia
- Children: Four children; two step-children

Patrick John Booth OBE (9 September 1929 – 31 January 2018) was a New Zealand print journalist and writer. He is noted for his coverage of the Arthur Allan Thomas case, and the Mr Asia crime syndicates.

== Biography ==
Booth was born on 9 September 1929 in Levin and raised in Hāwera. His first journalism job was on the Hawera Star in 1947. In 1950, he became a general reporter for The Auckland Star, in the first of what became several periods working at the paper, covering everything from sports to politics and crime.

In May 1971, Bishop Delargey of Auckland appointed Booth the editor (in succession to the conservative Denzil Meuli) of the Catholic newspaper Zealandia – the first layman to be appointed its editor. In that capacity he condemned the rock musical Hair, which featured a brief full nudity scene. The New Zealand production was prosecuted and Booth appeared as a police witness. After ten months he resigned from the position citing health issues. A few months before he had written to Delargey stating that he "could not have foreseen that what I would have regarded as conventional Catholic journalism would have caused such public differences of opinion, emotion and even intense bitterness."

Booth returned to work for The Auckland Star, and covered the Mr Asia drug syndicate and the Arthur Allan Thomas cases. Booth began a seven-year campaign to free Thomas. In 1975, he published his book about the case, Trial By Ambush, and won the National Investigative Journalism Award that year. In 1979, Arthur Allan Thomas was pardoned, and, two years later, in the 1981 Queen's Birthday Honours, Booth was appointed an Officer of the Order of the British Empire, for services to journalism.

In the late 1970s, Booth uncovered the brutal Mr Asia drugs syndicate and one of its key players, Terry Clark. Despite considerable threats, he published a series of articles on the case in The Auckland Star, and then published a book, The Mr Asia File, in 1980.

Booth became deputy editor of The Auckland Star in 1977. In 1980, he moved to Radio Pacific as a news executive. Later he worked for North and South magazine, winning the 1988 Media Peace Prize for his article "Learning To Live With The Waitangi Tribunal – Facts Without Fear." He later worked for Suburban Newspapers Auckland, a Fairfax subsidiary, where he ran a controversial series on Asian immigration to New Zealand. He was also a regular newspaper columnist and lectured in journalism. He wrote a number of novels and biographies, and published his autobiography, Deadline, in 1997.

Booth was active in local-body politics, serving on the Howick Community Board, the Far North District Council, the Northland District and Waitemata District Health Boards, and the Waitakere City Council.

Booth died at a rest home in Kumeū, after a short illness, on 31 January 2018, at the age of 88.
