= Military Ordinariate of New Zealand =

Catholic ecclesiastical jurisdiction in New Zealand

Military Ordinariate of New Zealand Ordinariatus Militaris Nova Zelandia

Location
- Country: New Zealand
- Ecclesiastical province: Immediately exempt to the Holy See
- Coordinates: 41.2768°S 174.7763°E

Information
- Denomination: Catholic Church
- Sui iuris church: Latin Church
- Rite: Roman Rite
- Established: 28 October 1976 (49 years ago)

Current leadership
- Pope: Leo XIV
- Bishop: Paul Gerard Martin

Website
- www.catholicmil.org.nz

The Military Ordinariate of New Zealand is a Latin Church military ordinariate of the Catholic Church. It is headquartered in Wellington. Immediately exempt to the Holy See, it provides pastoral care to Catholics serving in the New Zealand Defence Force and their families.

== History ==
It was created as a military dictate on 28 October 1976, and elevated to a military ordinariate on 21 July 1986. The first military vicar, Owen Noel Snedden, was also an auxiliary bishop of Wellington. His successor, Edward Gaines, was also the Bishop of Hamilton. Since 1995, the post of Military Ordinary has been held by the Archbishops of Wellington.

== Office holders ==
=== Military vicars ===
- Owen Noel Snedden (appointed 28 October 1976 – died 17 April 1981)
- Edward Gaines (appointed 19 June 1981 – became Military Ordinary 21 July 1986)

=== Military ordinaries ===
- Bishop Edward Gaines (appointed 21 July 1986 – died 6 September 1994)
- Cardinal Thomas Williams (appointed 1 June 1995 – retired 1 April 2005)
- Cardinal John Dew (appointed 1 April 2005 – retired 27 May 2023)
- Archbishop Paul Martin (appointed 27 May 2023 – incumbent)
