= John Cunneen (bishop) =

8th Roman Catholic bishop of Christchurch, New Zealand (1932–2010)

- 8th Bishop of Christchurch

Personal details
- Born: 5 May 1932 Ashburton, New Zealand
- Died: 9 November 2010 Christchurch, New Zealand

John Jerome Cunneen (5 May 1932 – 9 November 2010) was a New Zealand prelate who served as the eighth Catholic Bishop of Christchurch from 1995 until 2007. He was succeeded as bishop by Barry Jones.

== Death ==
Cunneen died on 9 November 2010 at the age of 78. He was laid in state at St Mary's pro-Cathedral in Christchurch but was buried in The Cathedral of the Blessed Sacrament.

== Notes ==
Catholic Church titles
Preceded by –	Auxiliary Bishop of Christchurch; 1992–1995	Succeeded by –
Preceded by Basil Meeking	Bishop of Christchurch; 1995–2007	Succeeded by Barry Jones
