= Antonio Hall (house) =

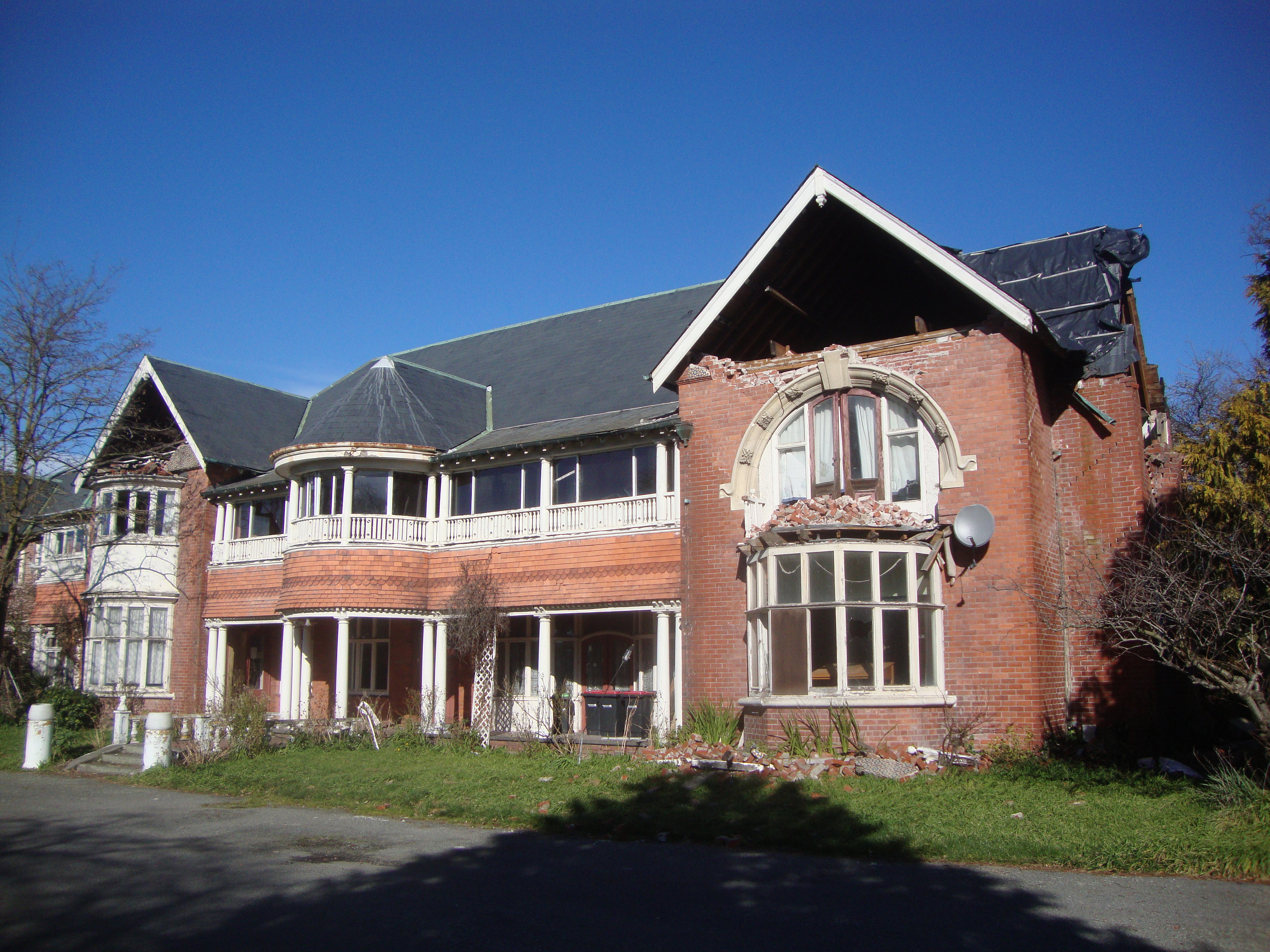
- Antonio Hall in August 2011 with earthquake damage
- Former names: Kilmead; Campion Hall
- Alternative names: Antonio House

General information
- Type: Residential home
- Architectural style: blend of English and American domestic architecture
- Location: Riccarton, 265 Riccarton Road, Christchurch, New Zealand
- Coordinates: 43.53152°S 172.584484°E
- Current tenants: Vacant
- Construction started: 1904
- Completed: 1909
- Renovated: 1950s
- Demolished: 2026
- Owner: Wellstar Co Ltd

Design and construction
- Architects: Clarkson & Ballantyne (homestead); Collins and Harman (extensions)

Heritage New Zealand – Category 2
- Designated: 25 October 1996
- Reference no.: 7336

References
- "Antonio House". New Zealand Heritage List/Rārangi Kōrero. Heritage New Zealand.

Antonio Hall, also known as Antonio House and previously Kilmead and Campion Hall, was a historic mansion in the Christchurch suburb of Riccarton. Although protected as a Category II heritage building by Heritage New Zealand, it was left to fall into ruin. A large property with 279 rooms and once described as "one of the finest in Christchurch and vicinity", it was for three decades used as a Catholic seminary. After a major fire in July 2019, Antonio Hall was then almost completely destroyed by another fire on 5 November 2021.

== History ==
The mansion was built between 1904 and 1909 for Thomas Kincaid and named Kilmead by him. Kincaid was a merchant and Christchurch city councillor. William Albert Paxton Clarkson and Robert Anderson Ballantyne, architects trading as Clarkson & Ballantyne, designed the building. When Kincaid died in 1928, his residence was described in his obituary as "one of the finest in Christchurch and vicinity". The property was purchased by farmer and businessman John Montgomery, who owned the property until 1946.

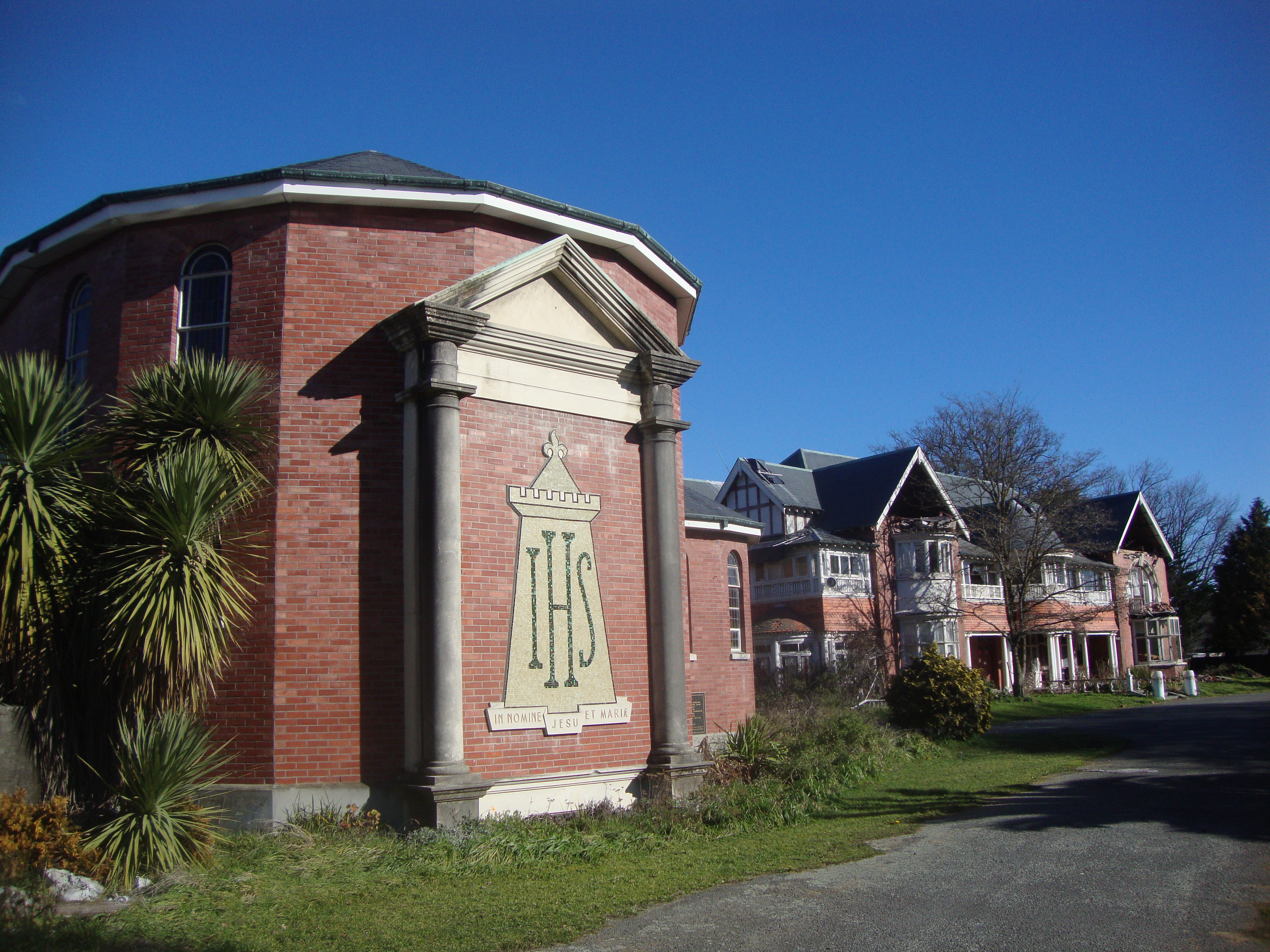
The chapel in the foreground

The Catholic Bishop of Christchurch, Patrick Lyons, bought the property for the Holy Name Seminary as a seminary staffed by the Society of Jesus established for the training of priests. The ageing archbishop of Wellington, Thomas O'Shea, caused great amusement at the formal opening in February 1947 when he talked about the opening of a "cemetery", and then fell asleep during Prime Minister Peter Fraser's speech. The church added a chapel, a library, lecture halls and a dormitory, which ran perpendicular to the original house. All the design work was carried out by the architectural firm Collins and Harman. The seminary closed in 1978 when the church merged the training facility with their school in Mosgiel, and then ran it as student accommodation under the new name Campion Hall, given the proximity to the University of Canterbury. In total, the building has 279 rooms, including over 100 bedrooms.

Patrick and Veronica Luisetti purchased the property in 1981. They continued to run it as a boarding house and gave it the name Antonio Hall in memory of their son Anthony, who had died in 1975. Ownership changed to Wellstar Co Ltd in 1993, a company with owners of an address in Fendalton but who reside mainly in Taiwan. It is said that the company had plans to convert the property to motel units, but this did not happen and the decline of the buildings started.

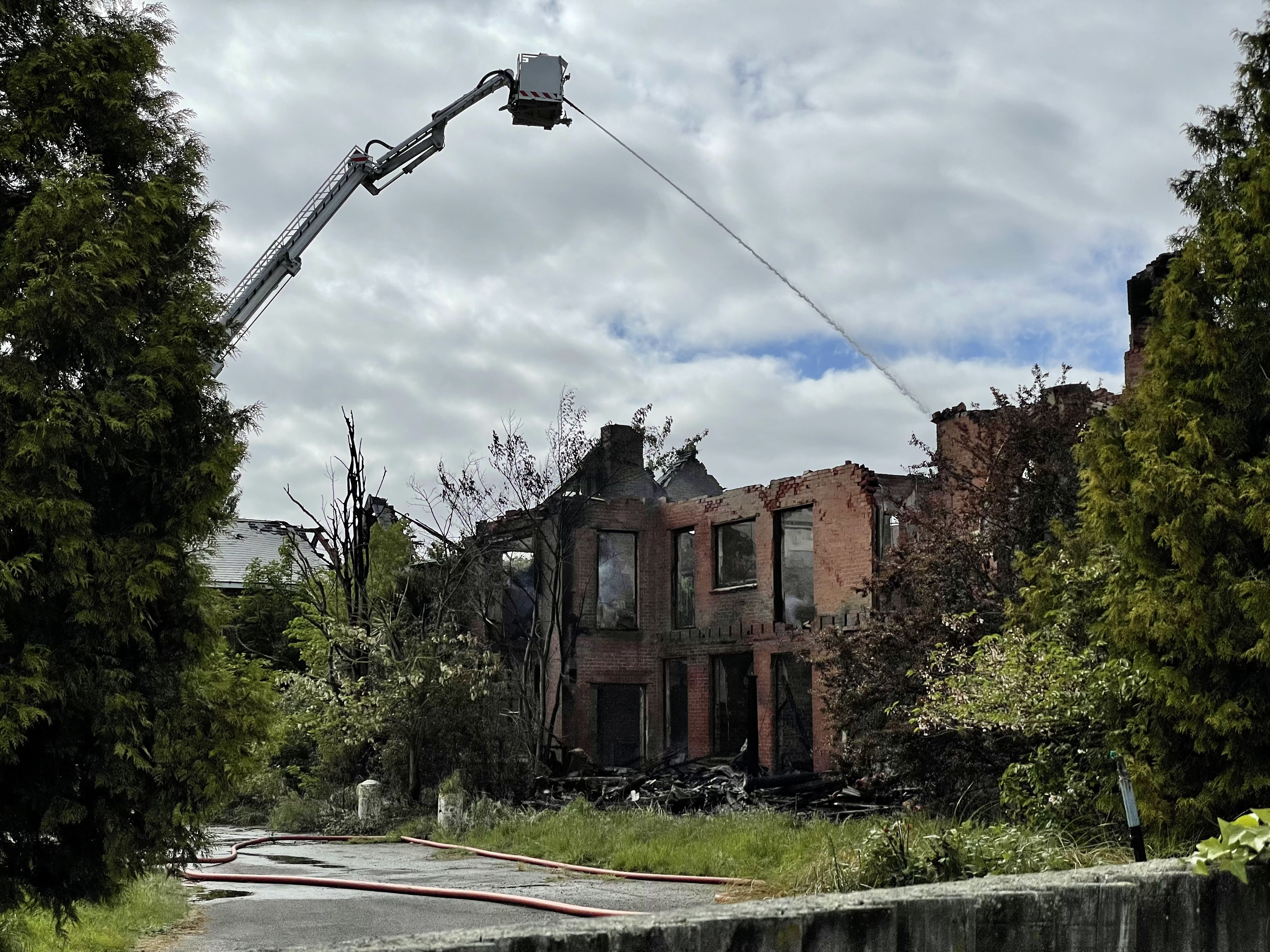
Fire service in attendance at Antonio Hall, following the fire of 5 November 2021

The property was empty when the February 2011 Christchurch earthquake hit, adding structural damage to the damaged caused by years of neglect. No repairs have been carried out since, and the property is unkempt and overgrown. The house caught fire in the afternoon on 12 July 2019. After the fire was brought under control it appeared that about one third of the building had been destroyed. A 14-year-old boy later admitted to arson. A subsequent fire on 5 November 2021 destroyed a large portion of the remaining structure.

By early 2022, the future of Antonio Hall had not been decided yet. In February 2024 a third suspected arson attack occurred when additional fires broke out in multiple parts of the building.

== Heritage status to demolition, 1996–2026 ==
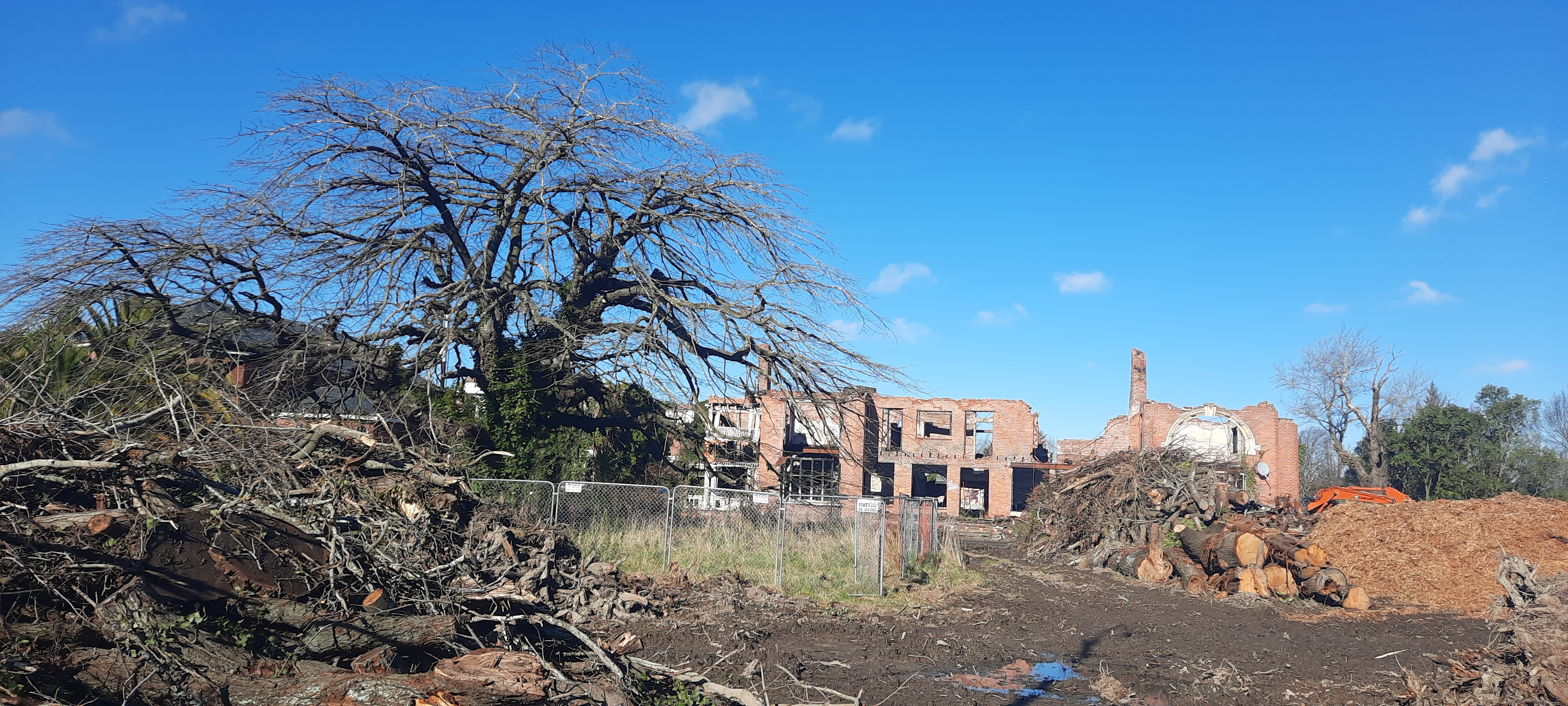
Antonio Hall during demolition and site clearance, July 2026

The property was registered by the New Zealand Historic Places Trust (since renamed to Heritage New Zealand) on 25 October 1996 as a Category II listing. From 2011, it had been unoccupied and suffered from unrepaired earthquake damage and from the effects of arsons in 2017 and 2021. The overseas owners, who had bought the property in 1991, chose not to arrange necessary repairs and maintenance. Christchurch City Council has no direct power to compel owners to maintain their properties and this, coupled with ongoing indecision on what to do with the building, led to its undergoing demolition by neglect. After some initial regulatory steps, in 2026, the council began demolition. Because 'demolition by neglect' is not legally defined in New Zealand, the council undertook the process by using its rights under the Building Act, which defined the building as "dangerous and insanitary". The land will be used for student accommodation for nearby University of Canterbury.
