= Patrick Murray (priest) =

New Zealand Catholic priest, editor and ecumenicist

Patrick Francis Murray (9 April 1931 – 6 August 1983) was a New Zealand Catholic priest, editor and ecumenicist.

== Biography ==
Murray was born in County Down, Northern Ireland, on 9 April 1931. He was educated at the National University of Ireland. He was ordained a priest at All Hallows College, Dublin, in 1954. He arrived in the Catholic Diocese of Auckland in 1956, and ministered in various parishes in that diocese.

In 1962, Murray was appointed assistant editor of Zealandia, the Catholic weekly newspaper owned by the Bishop of Auckland, James Liston. Liston had become increasingly dissatisfied with the editorial line taken by the previous editor, Father Ernest Simmons, and dismissed him. Murray was appointed to replace Simmons but continued the same editorial approach, which was highly favourable to the reforms of the Second Vatican Council but also included liberal comments on contraception. Murray was in turn dismissed from the post later in 1969 and replaced by the very conservative priest, Denzil Meuli. Murray's removal provoked protests from Zealandia readers, the resignation of all the paper's staff, and a significant protest outside the bishop's residence, which included supporters and opponents of Liston.

Murray was a Catholic representative in the formal dialogue between the Catholic Church and New Zealand Methodists and was closely involved in Anglican–Catholic discussions. He was on the joint National Council of Churches–Catholic committee that planned a new council of churches, an initiative that was ultimately unsuccessful.

Murray was parish priest of Te Awamutu in the Diocese of Hamilton when he died suddenly at his presbytery on 6 August 1983 at the age of 52.
