= Thomas Williams (cardinal) =

New Zealand Catholic cardinal (1930–2023)

His Eminence Thomas Williams ONZ ChStJ
- Cardinal, Archbishop of Wellington
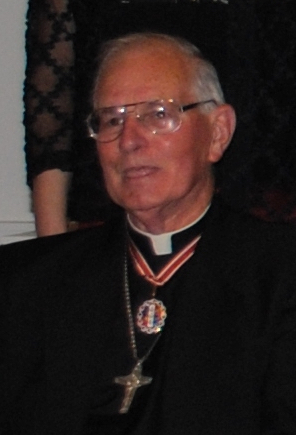
- Williams in 2011
- Archdiocese: Wellington
- Appointed: 30 October 1979
- Installed: 20 December 1979
- Term ended: 21 March 2005
- Predecessor: Reginald Delargey
- Successor: John Dew
- Other post: Cardinal-Priest of Gesù Divin Maestro alla Pineta Sacchetti
- Previous post: Ordinary of the Military Ordinariate of New Zealand (1995–2005)

Orders
- Ordination: 20 December 1959 by Gregorio Pietro Agagianian
- Consecration: 20 December 1979 by Owen Snedden
- Created cardinal: 2 February 1983 by John Paul II
- Rank: Cardinal-Priest

Personal details
- Born: 20 March 1930 Wellington, New Zealand
- Died: 22 December 2023 (aged 93) Waikanae, New Zealand
- Denomination: Roman Catholic
- Motto: Unity in Christ
- Coat of arms: Thomas Williams's coat of arms

Thomas Stafford Williams ONZ ChStJ (20 March 1930 – 22 December 2023) was a New Zealand cardinal in the Catholic Church and the fifth Archbishop of Wellington from 1979 to 2005.

== Early life and education ==
Williams was born in Wellington, New Zealand, and educated at Holy Cross Primary School, Seatoun; SS Peter and Paul School, Lower Hutt; St. Patrick's College, Wellington; and St Kevin's College, Oamaru. He obtained a Bachelor of Commerce degree at Victoria University College, and worked for some years as an accountant. During his studies, he was deeply involved in the Catholic Youth Movement (YCW) and for a period worked full-time for the movement. In 1954, he commenced studies for the priesthood at the National Seminary, Holy Cross College, Mosgiel, Dunedin. In 1956 he was sent to the Pontifical Urban University in Rome, where he obtained a licentiate in theology and was ordained a priest on 20 December 1959. Later he received a social sciences degree from University College Dublin.

== Career ==
=== Early church career ===
Returning to Wellington, Williams served as assistant pastor and as Director of Studies at the Catholic Enquiry Centre. He left that post when he volunteered to serve as a missionary in Samoa (today the Archdiocese of Samoa-Apia), where he was parish priest for five years. He returned to New Zealand in 1963 and became parish priest at St. Patrick's in Palmerston North for two years. This was followed by four years as Director of the Catholic Enquiry Centre in Wellington. In 1971 he moved to Leulumoega, Samoa and returned to New Zealand in 1976 to the Holy Family Parish in Porirua East. He celebrated the 60th year of his ordination in December 2019.

=== Archbishop of Wellington ===
Williams became Archbishop of Wellington on 20 December 1979 – his 20th anniversary of priestly ordination – following the death of Reginald Cardinal Delargey. His principal consecrator was Owen Snedden, long-term Auxiliary Bishop of Wellington. Williams was created Cardinal-Priest of the titular church of Jesus the Divine Teacher at Pineta Sacchetti by Pope John Paul II on 2 February 1983.

Styles of Thomas Williams
- Reference style: His Eminence
- Spoken style: Your Eminence
- Informal style: Cardinal
- See: Wellington (emeritus)

He was additionally appointed Military Ordinary in 1995. He was appointed a Member of the Order of New Zealand, New Zealand's highest civilian honour, in the 2000 Queen's Birthday Honours.

Williams campaigned strongly against the passage of the law allowing civil unions in New Zealand saying it would turn New Zealand into a "moral wasteland". He also campaigned against the expansion of casinos.

== Conclave and retirement ==
Williams was one of the cardinal electors who participated in the 2005 papal conclave that elected Pope Benedict XVI. He resigned as Archbishop of Wellington on 21 March 2005 having reached the age of 75 and was succeeded by Coadjutor Archbishop John Dew.

In retirement, Williams lived at a retirement village in Waikanae. He died there on 22 December 2023, at the age of 93.

== Selected works ==
- In his own words: a tribute to Cardinal Thomas Williams. ISBN 0-86469-476-8

Catholic Church titles
Preceded by Reginald Delargey	Archbishop of Wellington; 30 October 1979 – 21 March 2005	Succeeded by John Dew
Preceded by John Kavanagh	President of the New Zealand Episcopal Conference; 1980–1988	Succeeded by Edward Gaines
Preceded by John Wright	Cardinal Priest of Gesù Divin Maestro alla Pineta Sacchetti; 2 February 1983 – 22 December 2023	Vacant
Conference established	President of the Federation of Catholic Bishops' Conferences of Oceania; 1992–1999	Succeeded by Soane Lilo Foliaki
Preceded by Edward Gaines	Military Ordinary of New Zealand; 1 June 1995 – 1 April 2005	Succeeded by John Dew
