= John Mackey (bishop) =

Catholic bishop (1918-2014)

- Bishop of Auckland
- Church: Catholic Church
- Diocese: Diocese of Auckland
- In office: 25 April 1974 – 1 January 1983
- Predecessor: Reginald Delargey
- Successor: Denis Browne

Orders
- Ordination: 23 November 1941
- Consecration: 30 June 1974 by Pope Paul VI

Personal details
- Born: 11 January 1918 Bray, County Wicklow, United Kingdom of Great Britain and Ireland
- Died: 20 January 2014 (aged 96)

John Mackey CBE (11 January 1918 – 20 January 2014) was the ninth Bishop of Auckland, New Zealand (1974–1983).

Born in Bray, County Wicklow in Ireland, he came at the age of six to New Zealand with his widowed mother to live with Father John O'Byrne, who was his mother's brother and parish priest of Epsom.

He received his secondary education at Sacred Heart College, Auckland and studied for the priesthood at New Zealand's National Seminary, Holy Cross College, Mosgiel. He was ordained a priest on 23 November 1941 in Auckland, and received episcopal consecration in Rome from Pope Paul VI on 30 June 1974. Mackey was Bishop of Auckland from 1974 until his retirement due to a recurring health problem in 1983.

Previously he had been professor of church history at Holy Cross College and lecturer in church history at the University of Otago. He gained a doctorate in education and a master's degree in history and was awarded a Fulbright Scholarship and a graduate scholarship to the University of Notre Dame (South Bend, Indiana), studying there for two years before returning to take up the appointment of director of education for the Auckland diocese. With the passage of the Private Schools Conditional Integration Act 1975, while he was Bishop of Auckland, Mackey played a key role in the integration of Catholic schools into the state system, developing a close working relationship with the Minister of Education, Merv Wellington.

Another event of his episcopate was the creation of the Diocese of Hamilton out of the area of the Auckland diocese located south of Auckland city.

In the 1983 New Year Honours, Mackey was appointed a Commander of the Order of the British Empire, for services to education.

In the earlier years of his retirement, Mackey was a guest lecturer in New Zealand and abroad and conducted occasional courses in Church History at Holy Cross College. He supervised the preparation of the new faith education programmes for Catholic secondary schools on behalf of the New Zealand bishops. He was the author of three books. Until shortly before his death, Mackey continued to write on a variety of subjects, including reviews and reflections for Catholic publications.

His obsequies occurred on 27 January 2014 at St Patrick's Cathedral, Auckland in which his remains were interred near those of one of his predecessors, George Lenihan OSB (1858–1910), fifth Catholic Bishop of Auckland (1896–1910), the only other bishop buried in the cathedral

== Bibliography ==
- The making of a state education system: the passing of the New Zealand Education Act 1877, Geoffrey Chapman, London, 1967.
- Reflections on Church History, New Zealand Tablet Company, Dunedin, 1975.
- Looking at ourselves: the church moving towards the third millennium, Freedman Paul, Auckland, 1994.

Catholic Church titles
Preceded by Reginald Delargey	9th Bishop of Auckland; 1974–1983	Succeeded by Denis Browne
