= Immacolata al Tiburtino =

Roman Catholic church in Rome

- Church of Mary Immaculate and Jan Berchmans in Tiburtino (in English); Conceptionis Immaculatæ Beata Mariæ Virginis ad viam Tiburtinam (in Latin)
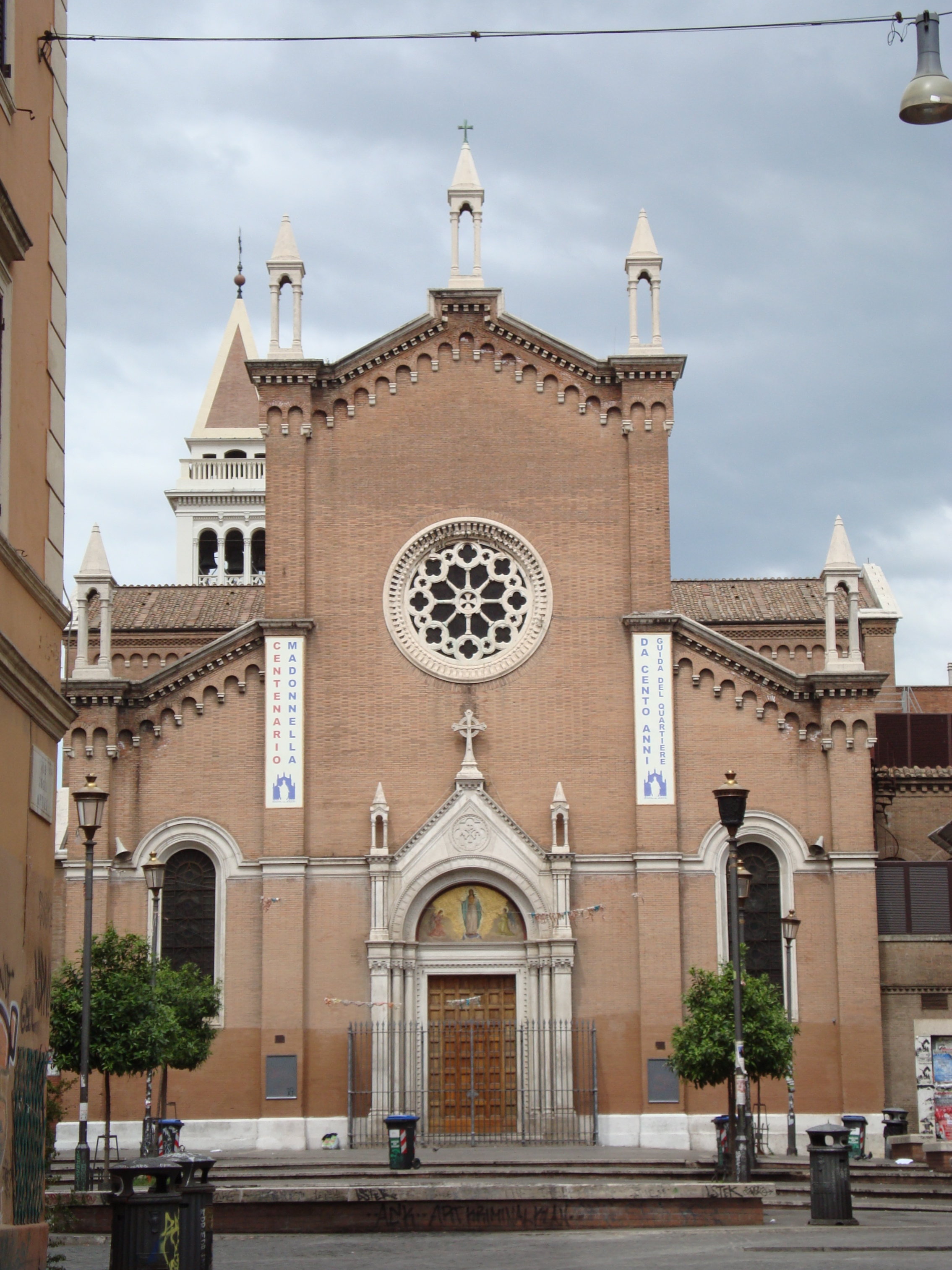
- Facade
- Click on the map for a fullscreen view
- 41°53′50″N 12°30′53″E
- Location: Via dei Sabelli, Rome
- Country: Italy
- Denomination: Roman Catholic
- Tradition: Roman Rite

History
- Status: Titular church
- Dedication: Mary, mother of Jesus and John Berchmans
- Consecrated: 1909

Architecture
- Architect: Constantino Schneider
- Architectural type: Church
- Style: Neo-Roman; Neo-Gothic
- Groundbreaking: 1906
- Completed: 1909

Administration
- District: Lazio
- Province: Rome

The church of St. Mary Immaculate and St. John Berchmans is a place of Catholic worship in Rome, located in the Tiburtino district, in the Immaculate Square.

== History ==
It was built by order of Pope Pius X between 1906 and 1909 on plans by Constantine Schneider, and was solemnly consecrated by the Archbishop of Malines, Cardinal Desire Mercier, 19 March 1909. It was also dedicated to John Berchmans, a Belgian Jesuit, as a sign of gratitude to the Belgian Catholics who had given a substantial economic contribution to the building up of the church. The church is home parish, erected by Pope Pius X on 12 March 1909 with the Apostolic Letter "In ordinandis", and entrusted to the Josephites of Murialdo. Since 1969 is the seat of the title of cardinal "Immacolata al Tiburtino". Raymundo Damasceno Assis is the incumbent cardinal-protector since 2010.

== Description ==
The church is Romanesque Revival style with neo-gothic elements. The exterior is clad in brick; the facade is salient and has, at the center, the portal with mosaic bezel and, at the top, the circular canopy. The bell tower, inspired by that of San Marco in Venice was added later, in 1929, it is home to a concert of six bells.

The interior has a Latin cross with three naves, with vaulted ceilings and stained glass windows. The interior decoration dates back to the Second World War (1946-1954) and was created by Mario Prayer: the apse is depicted the triumph of the Virgin with Saints and Martyrs; many characters depicted in the decoration of the transept and the nave are taken from photographs of men and women who fell in the bombings of 19 July 1943. On the choir behind the high altar, there is the pipe organ, built in 1925 by Zeno Fedeli and then electrified, which has 17 registers on two manuals and pedal.

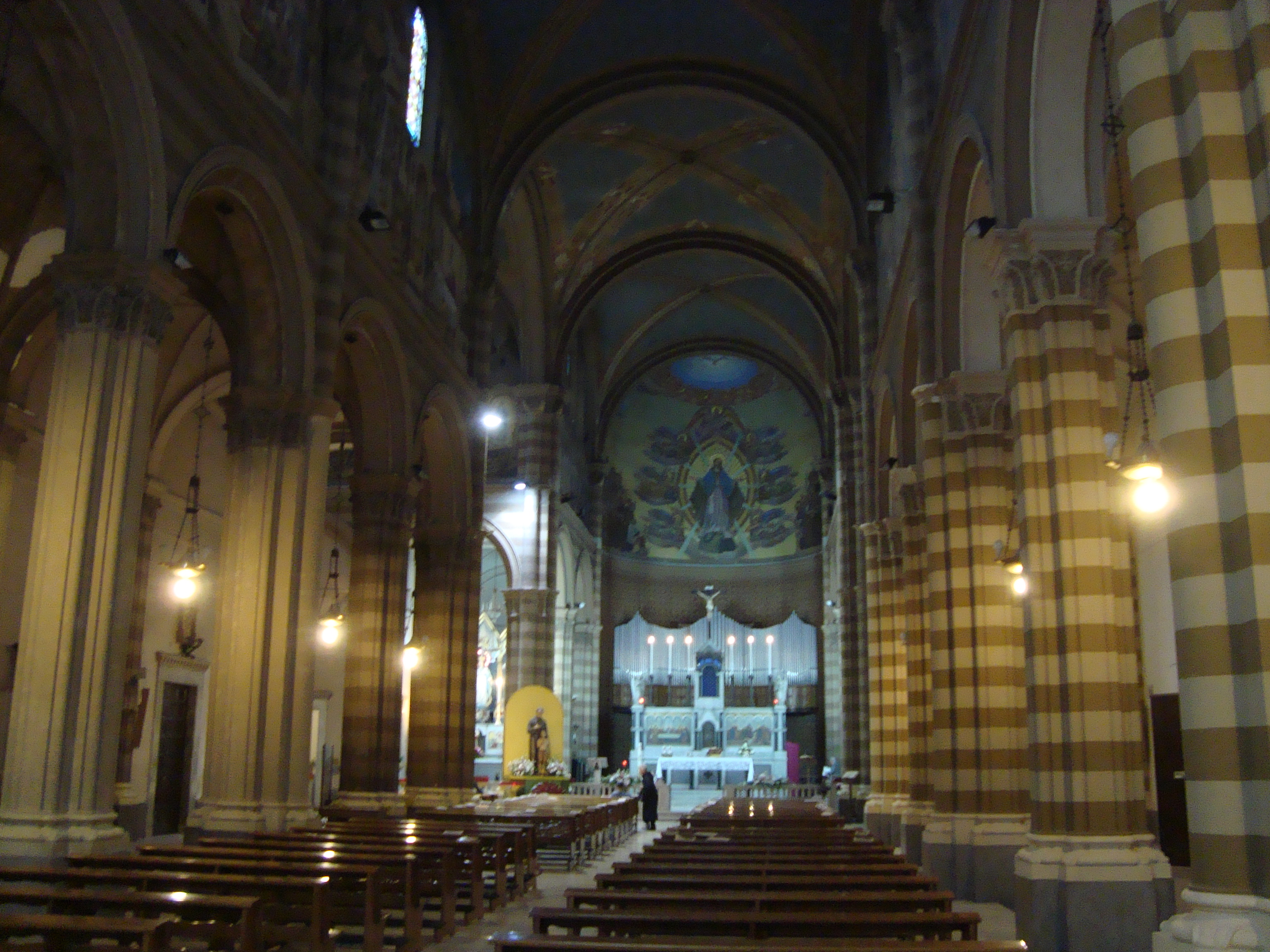
Interior of the church

== Cardinal Priest ==
Pope Paul VI established it as titular church on 30 April 1969.

- Peter McKeefry, 30 April 1969 (appointed) – 18 November 1973 (died)
- Reginald John Delargey, 24 May 1985 (appointed) – 29 January 1979 (died)
- Ernesto Corripio Ahumada, 30 June 1979 (appointed) – 10 April 2008 (died)
- Raymundo Damasceno Assis, 20 November 2010 (appointed) – present
