= Thomas O'Shea (bishop) =

American bishop (1870–1954)

- Archbishop of Wellington
- Church: Catholic
- Diocese: Wellington, New Zealand
- Installed: 3 January 1935
- Term ended: 9 May 1954
- Predecessor: Francis Redwood
- Successor: Peter McKeefry

Personal details
- Born: 13 March 1870 San Francisco, United States
- Died: 9 May 1954 (aged 84) Wellington, New Zealand

Thomas O'Shea SM (13 March 1870 – 9 May 1954) was an American bishop who served as Archbishop of Wellington from 1935 to 1954.

== Biography ==
Thomas O'Shea was born in 1870 to Irish immigrant parents Edmond Shea and Johanna Sullivan in San Francisco, California. He received his education in New Zealand, attending St Patrick's College, Wellington, and later became a teacher at the same institution. O'Shea was ordained as a member of the Society of Mary in 1893 and held various positions within the Wellington archdiocese.

In 1913, he became the coadjutor archbishop, and then ultimately succeeded Archbishop Francis Redwood in 1935. He played a significant role in promoting Catholic education, social justice, and cooperation with other Christian denominations on public matters. O'Shea died in 1954 at Calvary Hospital, Wellington, after struggling with senility in his later years.

== Honours ==
In 1935, he was awarded the King George V Silver Jubilee Medal.

== Notes ==
Catholic Church titles
Preceded by –	Coadjutor Archbishop of Wellington; 1913–1935	Succeeded by –
Preceded by Francis Redwood SM	2nd Archbishop of Wellington; 1935–1954	Succeeded by Peter McKeefry
