= Stafford Place =

Historic house in Appleby, New Zealand

Coordinates: 41°18′24″S 173°06′09″E

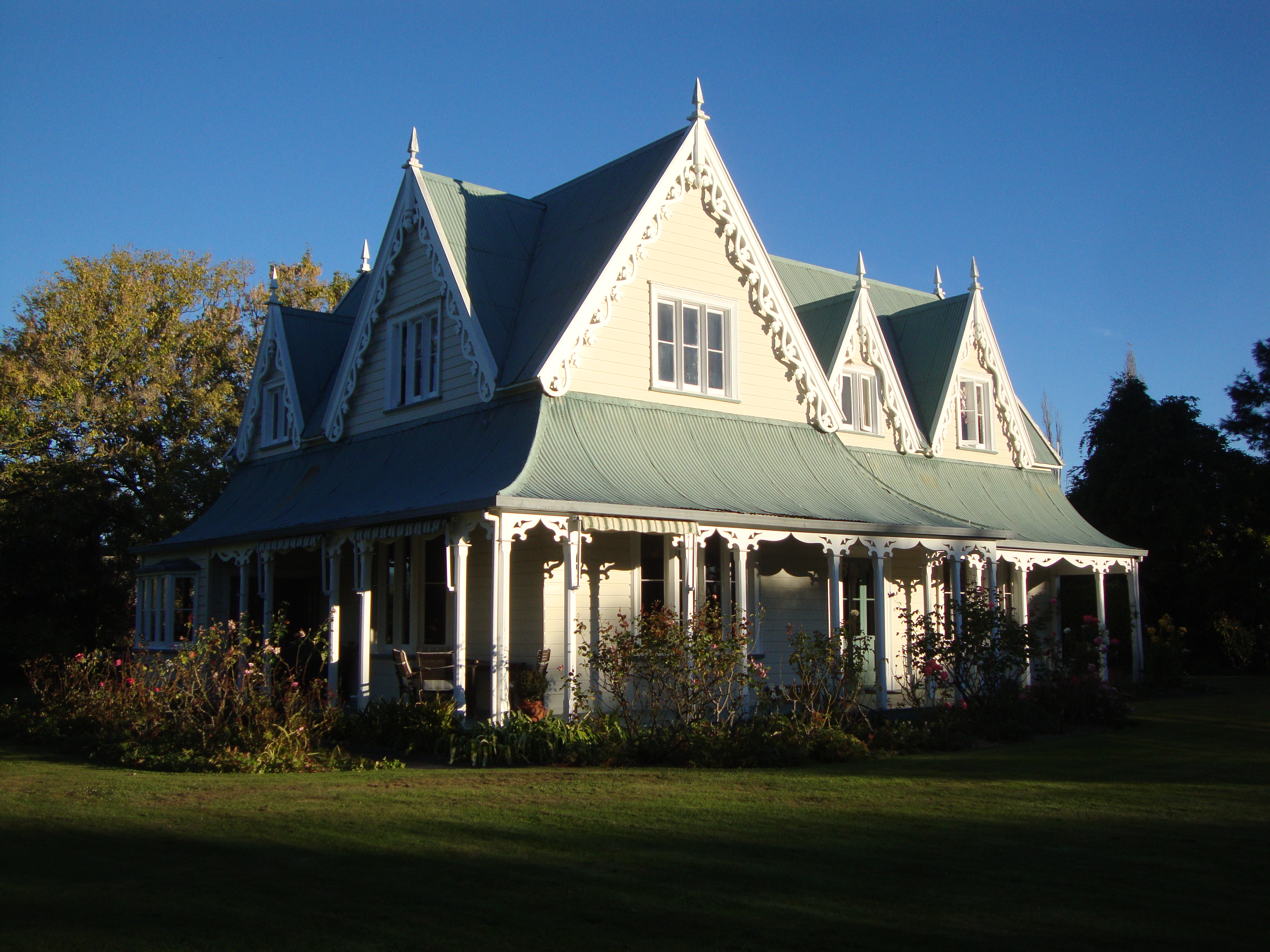
Stafford Place in 2012

Stafford Place at 61 Redwood Road, Appleby, New Zealand (near Richmond), is registered with the New Zealand Historic Places Trust as a Category I structure.

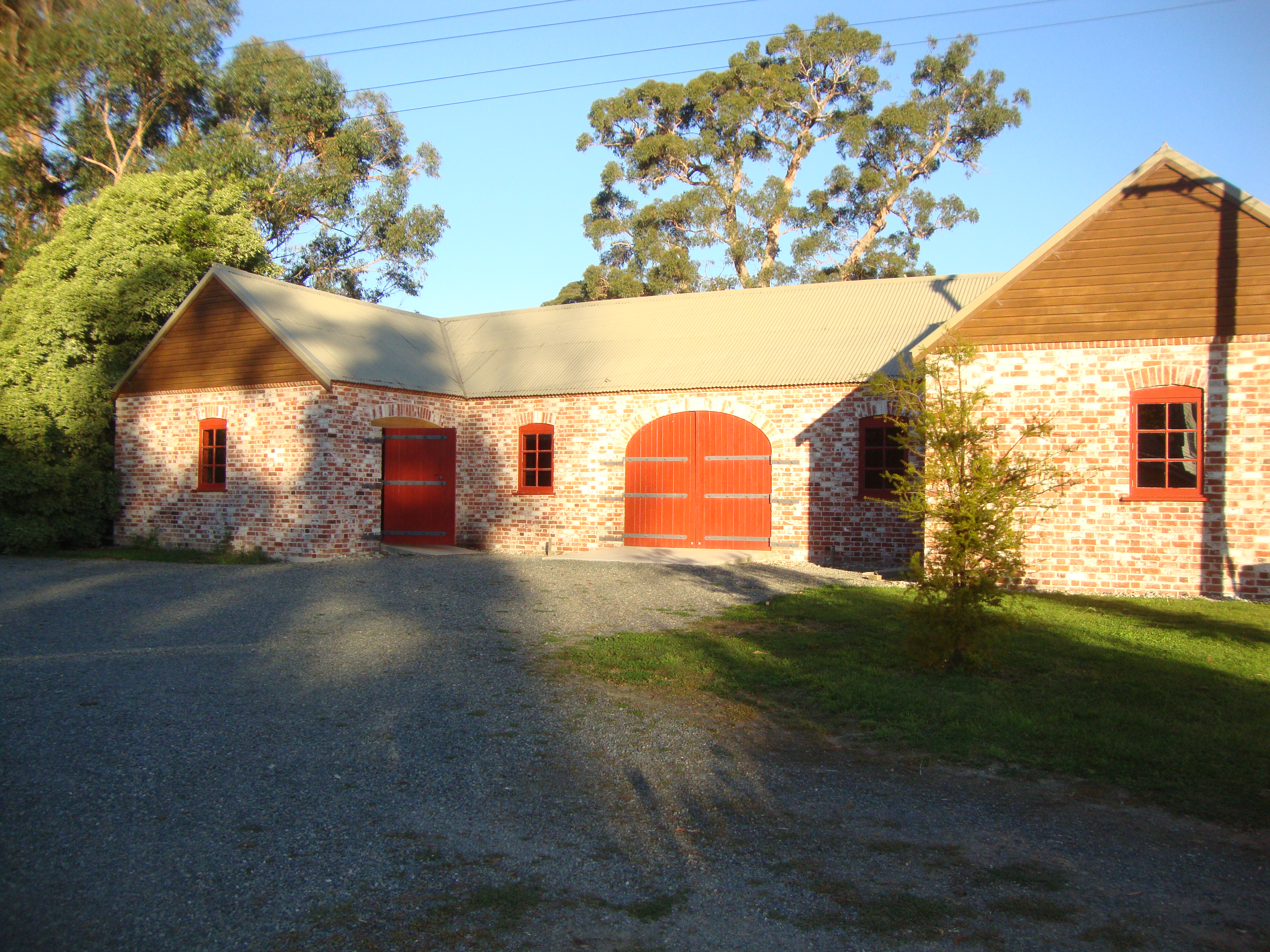
Stafford Place stables

Stafford Place was built in 1866 for Henry Redwood and his wife Mary. Through his sister Martha (1820–1893), Redwood was brother in law with Joseph Ward.

The house is in Carpenter Gothic style. The adjacent brick stables were significantly damaged in the 1929 Murchison earthquake. During the 2000s, the stables were rebuilt in accordance with the original design.
