= Appleby, New Zealand =

Locality in Tasman District, New Zealand

Appleby
- Locality
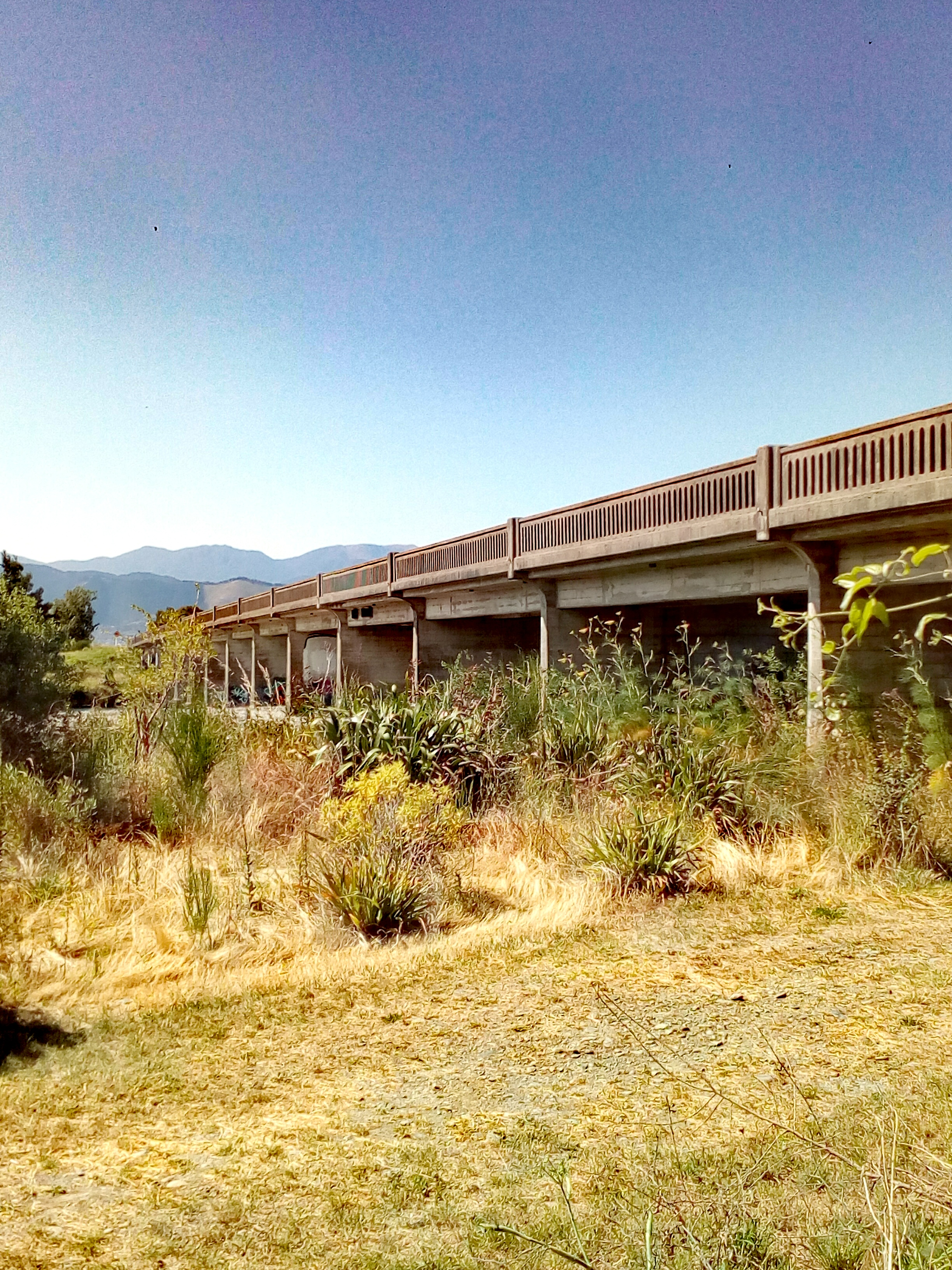
- Appleby Bridge
- Interactive map of Appleby
- Coordinates: 41.316°S 173.135°E
- Country: New Zealand
- Territorial authority: Tasman
- Ward: Richmond Ward
- Electorates: Nelson; Te Tai Tonga (Māori)

Government
  - Territorial Authority: Tasman District Council
  - Mayor of Tasman: Tim King
  - Nelson MP: Rachel Boyack
  - Te Tai Tonga MP: Tākuta Ferris

Area
  - Total: 20.50 km^{2} (7.92 sq mi)

Population (June 2025)
  - Total: 790
  - Density: 39/km^{2} (100/sq mi)
- Time zone: UTC+12 (NZST)
  - Summer (DST): UTC+13 (NZDT)
- Area code: 03

Appleby is a locality in the Tasman district in the South Island of New Zealand. It is located around the Waimea River near the Tasman Bay / Te Tai-o-Aorere. It was first settled in the early 1840s. State Highway 60 passes through the settlement.

There are three buildings in Appleby registered with Heritage New Zealand:

- Springfield, a house on the corner of State Highway 60 and Cotterill Road, is registered as Category II with registration number 1646.
- St Alban's Church on State Highway 60 is registered as Category II with registration number 1654.
- Stafford Place at 61 Redwood Road is registered as Category I with registration number 1678.

In addition, the Redwood Racing Stables, which belonged to Stafford Place, were located on State Highway 60 and were relocated to Richmond, are registered as Category I with registration number 246.

== Demographics ==
The Appleby statistical area covers 20.50 km^{2} (7.92 sq mi). It had an estimated population of 790 as of June 2025, with a population density of 39 people per km^{2}.

Historical population
Year	Pop.	±% p.a.
2006	744	—
2013	738	−0.12%
2018	756	+0.48%
2023	765	+0.24%
The 2006 population is for a smaller area of 20.07 km^{2}. Source:

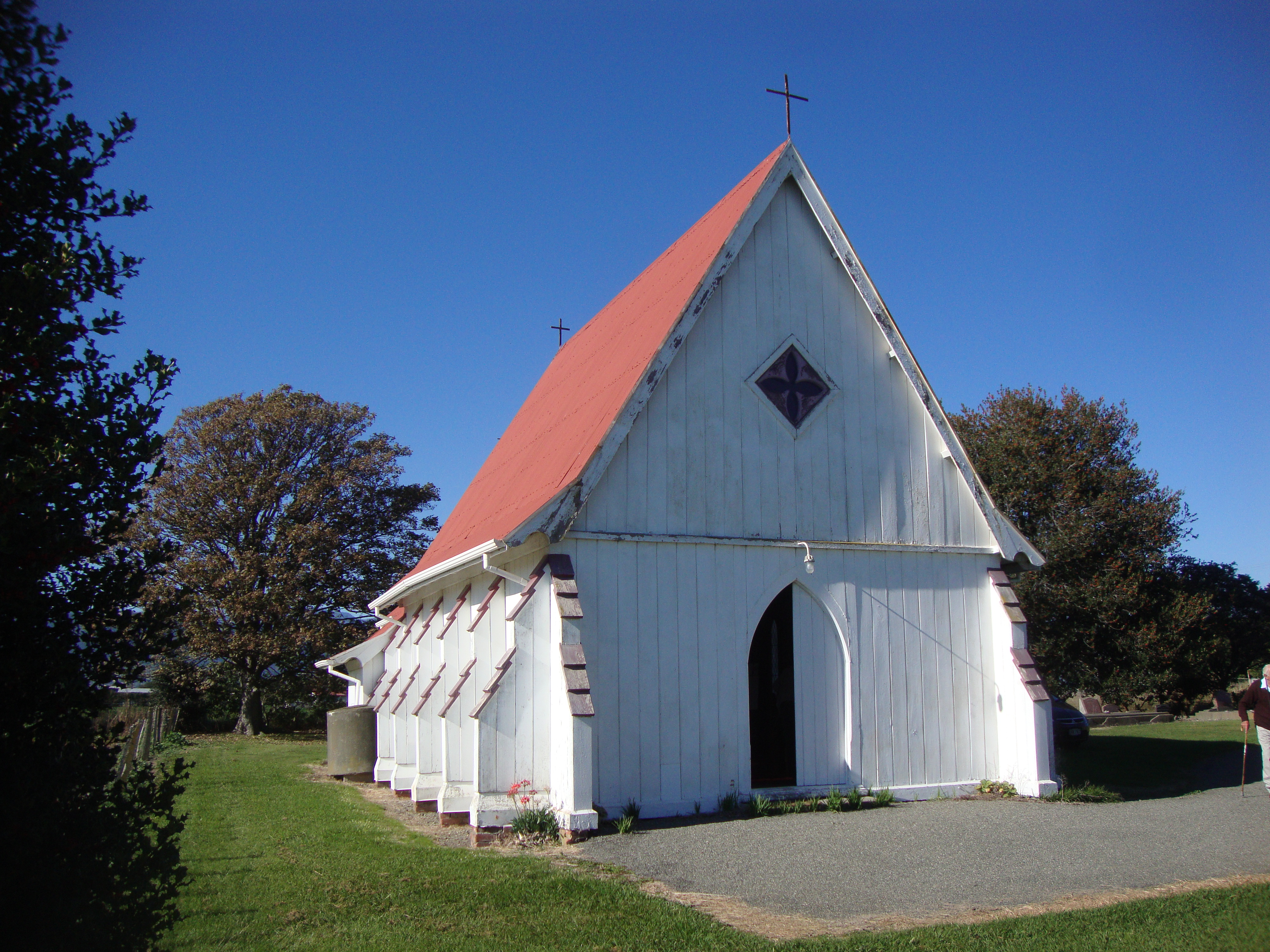
St. Alban's Anglican church

Appleby had a population of 765 in the 2023 New Zealand census, an increase of 9 people (1.2%) since the 2018 census, and an increase of 27 people (3.7%) since the 2013 census. There were 408 males, 354 females, and 3 people of other genders in 273 dwellings. 3.1% of people identified as LGBTIQ+. The median age was 47.2 years (compared with 38.1 years nationally). There were 108 people (14.1%) aged under 15 years, 141 (18.4%) aged 15 to 29, 354 (46.3%) aged 30 to 64, and 162 (21.2%) aged 65 or older.

People could identify as more than one ethnicity. The results were 90.6% European (Pākehā), 9.8% Māori, 4.3% Pasifika, 2.4% Asian, and 3.1% other, which includes people giving their ethnicity as "New Zealander". English was spoken by 98.8%, Māori by 2.4%, Samoan by 0.4%, and other languages by 5.5%. No language could be spoken by 0.8% (e.g. too young to talk). New Zealand Sign Language was known by 1.2%. The percentage of people born overseas was 13.7, compared with 28.8% nationally.

Religious affiliations were 28.6% Christian, 0.4% Māori religious beliefs, 0.8% Buddhist, 0.4% New Age, and 0.8% other religions. People who answered that they had no religion were 62.4%, and 7.5% of people did not answer the census question.

Of those at least 15 years old, 111 (16.9%) people had a bachelor's or higher degree, 393 (59.8%) had a post-high school certificate or diploma, and 153 (23.3%) people exclusively held high school qualifications. The median income was $41,600, compared with $41,500 nationally. 75 people (11.4%) earned over $100,000 compared to 12.1% nationally. The employment status of those at least 15 was 333 (50.7%) full-time, 114 (17.4%) part-time, and 12 (1.8%) unemployed.

== Education ==
Appleby School is a state primary school for years 1 to 8 students. It had a roll of 143 students as of July 2026. The school opened on the current site in 1859.

== Climate ==
Climate data for Appleby (1991–2020 normals, extremes 1932–present)
Month	Jan	Feb	Mar	Apr	May	Jun	Jul	Aug	Sep	Oct	Nov	Dec	Year
Record high °C (°F)	32.6 (90.7)	35.7 (96.3)	29.6 (85.3)	28.3 (82.9)	25.0 (77.0)	20.7 (69.3)	19.0 (66.2)	20.0 (68.0)	24.1 (75.4)	26.4 (79.5)	28.6 (83.5)	30.2 (86.4)	35.7 (96.3)
Mean maximum °C (°F)	28.7 (83.7)	27.9 (82.2)	26.4 (79.5)	23.3 (73.9)	21.1 (70.0)	18.0 (64.4)	16.7 (62.1)	18.0 (64.4)	20.4 (68.7)	22.7 (72.9)	24.8 (76.6)	26.1 (79.0)	29.4 (84.9)
Mean daily maximum °C (°F)	22.8 (73.0)	23.0 (73.4)	21.6 (70.9)	18.8 (65.8)	16.4 (61.5)	13.7 (56.7)	13.1 (55.6)	13.9 (57.0)	15.5 (59.9)	17.3 (63.1)	19.1 (66.4)	21.1 (70.0)	18.0 (64.4)
Daily mean °C (°F)	16.9 (62.4)	17.0 (62.6)	15.3 (59.5)	12.6 (54.7)	10.1 (50.2)	7.6 (45.7)	6.9 (44.4)	8.1 (46.6)	9.9 (49.8)	11.8 (53.2)	13.3 (55.9)	15.7 (60.3)	12.1 (53.8)
Mean daily minimum °C (°F)	11.0 (51.8)	11.0 (51.8)	9.0 (48.2)	6.4 (43.5)	3.8 (38.8)	1.5 (34.7)	0.7 (33.3)	2.3 (36.1)	4.3 (39.7)	6.3 (43.3)	7.5 (45.5)	10.3 (50.5)	6.2 (43.1)
Mean minimum °C (°F)	5.5 (41.9)	4.6 (40.3)	2.8 (37.0)	0.1 (32.2)	−2.6 (27.3)	−4.5 (23.9)	−4.7 (23.5)	−3.3 (26.1)	−1.5 (29.3)	0.1 (32.2)	1.7 (35.1)	4.0 (39.2)	−5.4 (22.3)
Record low °C (°F)	2.3 (36.1)	1.0 (33.8)	0.1 (32.2)	−1.8 (28.8)	−7.0 (19.4)	−11.0 (12.2)	−9.7 (14.5)	−7.6 (18.3)	−3.8 (25.2)	−2.9 (26.8)	−1.2 (29.8)	0.9 (33.6)	−11.0 (12.2)
Average rainfall mm (inches)	74.1 (2.92)	66.0 (2.60)	70.5 (2.78)	79.0 (3.11)	86.7 (3.41)	105.8 (4.17)	73.5 (2.89)	77.7 (3.06)	77.9 (3.07)	79.6 (3.13)	68.5 (2.70)	88.1 (3.47)	947.4 (37.31)
Mean monthly sunshine hours	269.9	240.6	226.4	194.3	177.3	148.1	161.3	181.8	194.9	237.1	245.8	246.9	2,524.4
Source: NIWA
