= Paul Martin (bishop) =

New Zealand Catholic prelate (born 1967)

The Most Reverend Paul Martin SM
- Metropolitan Archbishop of Wellington
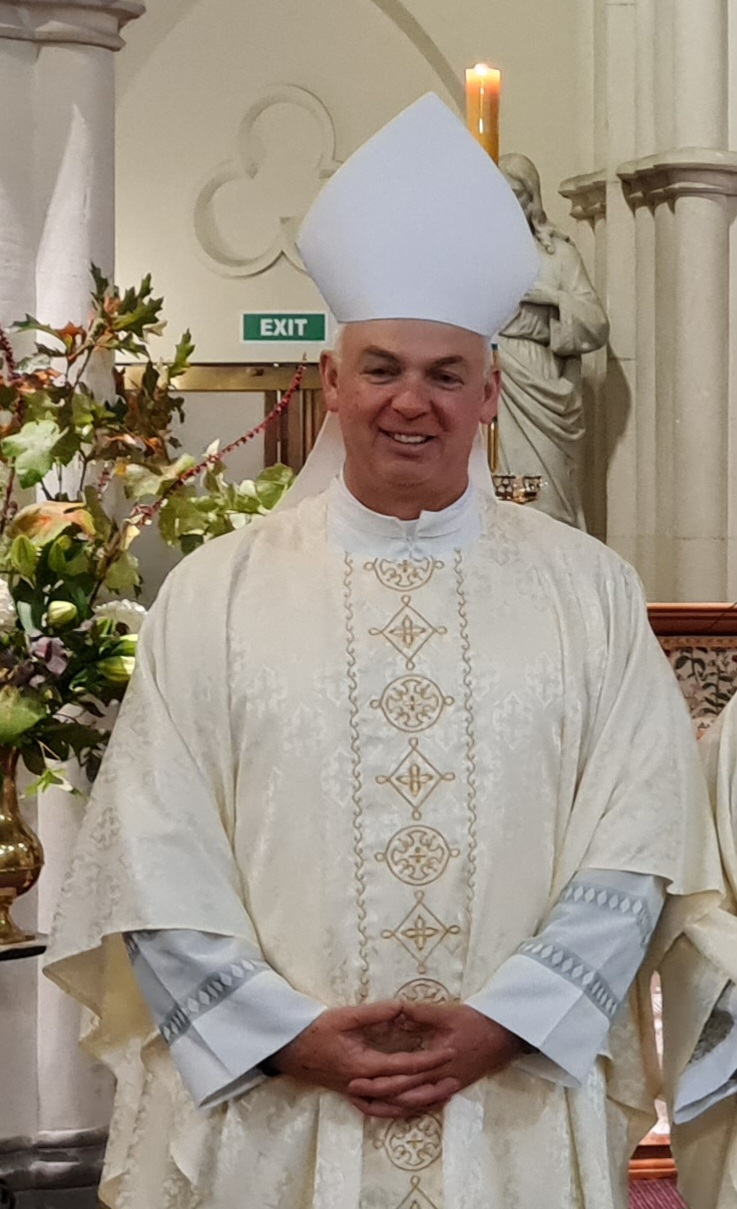
- Martin in 2024
- Archdiocese: Wellington
- Appointed: 1 January 2021 (coadjutor)
- Installed: 5 May 2023
- Predecessor: John Dew
- Previous post: Bishop of Christchurch (2018–2021) Apostolic Administrator of Christchurch (2021–2022)

Orders
- Ordination: 4 September 1993
- Consecration: 3 March 2018 by John Dew

Personal details
- Born: Paul Gerard Martin; 5 May 1967 (age 59) Hastings, New Zealand
- Denomination: Roman Catholic Church
- Occupation: Roman Catholic bishop
- Profession: Cleric
- Education: Marist Seminary, New Zealand; Pontifical University of Saint Thomas Aquinas, Rome
- Coat of arms

Styles of Paul Gerard Martin
- Reference style: The Most Reverend
- Spoken style: Your Grace
- Religious style: Archbishop

Ordination history of Paul Martin
History
Priestly ordination
- Date: 4 September 1993
Episcopal consecration
- Consecrated by: John Dew
- Date: 3 March 2018

Paul Gerard Martin SM (born 5 May 1967) is a New Zealand prelate of the Roman Catholic Church. He has served as the seventh Metropolitan Archbishop of Wellington and eighth ordinary of the see of Wellington, since 4 May 2023 (having served as coadjutor Archbishop of Wellington from January 2021 until he succeeded to the see). From March 2018 until January 2021, he was the tenth Bishop of Christchurch, New Zealand and its Apostolic Administrator from January 2021 until May 2022.

== Early life and education ==
Martin was born in Hastings, New Zealand. He is the son of Ronald and Carmel Martin, one of five children. He was educated at St Joseph's Primary School, Hastings, and undertook his secondary studies at St John's College.

== Priesthood ==
In 1985, Martin commenced priestly formation for the Society of Mary which included time working in an Aboriginal Community in the Northern Territory, Australia in 1991. He was ordained deacon on 15 November 1992 and priest on 4 September 1993. He graduated Baccalaureate in Sacred Theology from the Pontifical University of Saint Thomas Aquinas (Angelicum University), Rome, in 1993. He then studied to become a teacher. He filled teaching roles including at St Bede's College, Christchurch and as Rector of St Patrick's College, Kilbirnie, Wellington. He was Assistant Provincial and Provincial Bursar for the Society of Mary in New Zealand in 2014, before taking up the position of Bursar General of the order in Rome.

== Episcopacy ==
=== Bishop of Christchurch ===
On 5 December 2017, Martin was appointed by Pope Francis to replace Barry Jones, the 9th bishop of Christchurch, who died on 13 February 2016. On 3 March 2018 he was consecrated as the 10th bishop of Christchurch, in a large gathering at Boy's High School Auditorium, Christchurch, by Cardinal John Dew, Archbishop of Wellington, bishop emeritus of Christchurch Basil Meeking and Charles Drennan of Palmerston North.

During his tenure as Bishop of Christchurch, the diocese saw restructuring of parishes. Many parishes were combined to create five 'super' parishes in Christchurch, as well as combining all churches in the Selwyn and Waimakariri Districts in their own parish.

One of the decisions he faced as Bishop of Christchurch was the future of the Cathedral of the Blessed Sacrament, after it was severely damaged in the 2010, February 2011 and June 2011 Canterbury earthquakes. His predecessor, Barry Jones had suggested that the nave of the cathedral could be saved. In August 2019, Martin made the decision to demolish the cathedral. By September 2020, the demolition work began.

In December 2019, Martin made public plans for a new cathedral site, Catholic primary school, hotels, offices and a carpark, all in community and commercial collaboration with Ōtākaro Limited, and city developers, Carter Group.

=== Archbishop of Wellington ===
On 1 January 2021, he was appointed coadjutor Archbishop of the Archdiocese of Wellington by Pope Francis. He succeeded to the see on 4 May 2023 on his predecessor, Archbishop Dew attaining the age of 75 and his resignation being accepted by Pope Francis. He was installed as archbishop at St Theresa's Pro-Cathedral, Karori on 17 June 2023.

== The 2024 Royal Commission of Inquiry into Abuse in Care ==
On 26 July 2024, Archbishop Martin was interviewed on Radio New Zealand (RNZ) following the release of the Royal Commission of Inquiry into Abuse in Care.

== Approach ==
=== The Church ===
Martin has expressed his firm belief in the Catholic Church as the depository of the truth.

Catholic Church titles
Preceded by John Dew	Archbishop of Wellington; 2023–present	Incumbent
Preceded by	Coadjutor Archbishop of Wellington; 2021–2023	Succeeded by
Preceded by	Apostolic Administrator of Diocese of Christchurch; 2021–2023	Succeeded by
Preceded by Barry Jones	Bishop of Christchurch; 2017–2021	Succeeded by Michael Gielen
