= Peter McKeefry =

New Zealand Catholic cardinal (1899–1973)

His Eminence Peter McKeefry
- Archbishop of Wellington
- Church: Roman Catholic Church
- Appointed: 9 May 1954
- Term ended: 18 November 1973
- Predecessor: Thomas O'Shea
- Successor: Reginald John Delargey
- Other post: Cardinal-Priest of Immacolata al Tiburtino (1969-73)
- Previous posts: Titular Archbishop of Dercos (1947-54); Coadjutor Archbishop of Wellington (1947-54); President of the Bishops' Conference of New Zealand (1967-73)

Orders
- Ordination: 3 April 1926 by Basilio Pompili
- Consecration: 19 October 1947 by Norman Thomas Gilroy
- Created cardinal: 28 April 1969 by Pope Paul VI
- Rank: Cardinal-Priest

Personal details
- Born: Peter Thomas McKeefry; 3 July 1899 Greymouth, New Zealand
- Died: 18 November 1973 (aged 74) Wellington, New Zealand
- Education: Kavanagh College; Holy Cross College
- Alma mater: Pontifical Urbaniana University
- Motto: Pastor bonus esto

Styles of Peter McKeefry
- Reference style: His Eminence
- Spoken style: Your Eminence
- Informal style: Cardinal
- See: Wellington

Peter Thomas Bertram McKeefry (3 July 1899 – 18 November 1973) was the third archbishop of Wellington (1954–73) and metropolitan of New Zealand and its first cardinal.

== Early life and education ==
McKeefry was born in Greymouth. He was the fifth of seven children of Michael McKeefry, a police constable, and Mary (née McAlary). Both his parents were from County Londonderry, Ireland. After living briefly in Christchurch, the family moved to Dunedin, where McKeefry was educated at the Christian Brothers' Boys' School. He began training for the priesthood in 1916 at Holy Cross College, Mosgiel. In 1922 he was sent to study for four years at the Collegium Urbanum de Propaganda Fide, Rome. He was ordained a priest on 3 April 1926 at the Basilica di San Giovanni in Laterano.

== The Month and Zealandia ==
McKeefry initially served as a curate at the cathedral in Auckland. He also became secretary to Bishop Henry Cleary, whom he assisted with the diocesan newspaper the Month. After Cleary's death in 1929 his successor, Bishop James Liston, appointed McKeefry as his own secretary and as editor of the Month.

Under McKeefry's editorship the Month became in May 1934 the fortnightly Zealandia, which started weekly publication from June 1937. McKeefry played an important role in organising the 1938 celebrations to mark the centenary of Bishop Pompallier's arrival in New Zealand.

Editorially, McKeefry concentrated on the need to apply Catholic ideals to contemporary society. While avoiding party politics, he criticised the response of the coalition government (1931-1935) of George Forbes to unemployment and exhorted readers to vote for candidates most likely to act in accordance with "Christian charity, justice and order".

== Wellington ==
On 12 June 1947 McKeefry was appointed titular bishop of Dercos and coadjutor archbishop of Wellington. He was consecrated in St Patrick's Cathedral, Auckland, on 19 October 1947 by Cardinal Norman Gilroy, Archbishop of Sydney, whom McKeefry had known as a fellow student in Rome. Within a short time Archbishop O'Shea, no longer capable of managing the affairs of the archdiocese, effectively turned its management over to McKeefry. When O'Shea died on 9 May 1954 McKeefry was named the fourth bishop and third Archbishop of Wellington. (The first bishop, Philippe Viard, was not named archbishop of the diocese.) McKeefry was the first New Zealand-born and the first bishop from the diocesan clergy to take charge of the archdiocese, his three predecessors having belonged to the Marists.

By the time McKeefry arrived in Wellington the archdiocese's development had long been delayed by the depression and the Second World War. Seeking to reduce reliance on the Marists, he benefited from many local vocations and recruited priests and religious from Ireland and elsewhere. Thirty-nine new parishes - most with associated primary schools - were established in the archdiocese between 1947 and 1969. He invited the Cistercians to the Archdiocese and assisted them to establish Southern Star Abbey in Hawkes Bay.

In 1953, McKeefry was awarded the Queen Elizabeth II Coronation Medal.

== Vatican II ==
In 1960 McKeefry had been appointed to the Central Preparatory Commission, which supervised the drafting of documents for the forthcoming Second Vatican Council (1962–65). During the council's first session, in 1962, these very traditional statements were severely criticized. McKeefry had no sympathy for proposals to introduce vernacular languages into the liturgy. He did not attend the council's second session the following year, although he returned to Rome for the 1964 and 1965 sessions, which he found rather tedious.

In 1962 Owen Snedden, who had assisted and then succeeded McKeefry as editor of Zealandia, was appointed auxiliary bishop of Wellington. He was largely responsible for liturgical matters including the editing of translations of liturgical books into English, in which undertaking he was helped by the Abbot and monks of Southern Star Abbey, Kopua. But, in liturgical matters and in other respects, Snedden was given little independence by McKeefry. Following the Council McKeefry established a hierarchy of parish and district councils culminating in the Diocesan Pastoral Council.

== Cardinal ==
On 28 April 1969 McKeefry was proclaimed by Pope Paul VI a Cardinal-Priest of Immacolata al Tiburtino. He was the first New Zealand cardinal, a recognition by the Vatican of the maturity of the church in New Zealand and of its role in the South Pacific, as well as reflecting Paul VI's policy of making the College of Cardinals more international. It was clearly also a personal tribute to McKeefry who was well known and respected in the Vatican. As a cardinal, McKeefry was appointed to two international commissions based in Rome: the Sacred Congregation for the Clergy and the Sacred Congregation for the Evangelization of Peoples (also called the Congregation for the Propagation of the Faith).

At 6'4" McKeefry was tall and slim. From his arrival in Wellington, carrying all his possessions in a few small suitcases, he lived at the Thorndon presbytery occupying only two modest rooms as his office and bedroom. Observing the frayed cuff of the cardinal-elect's suit during a 1969 interview, a journalist reflected that it may have been the same one seen in similar condition by a colleague 22 years earlier.

Although a scholar rather than a sportsman, he could talk knowledgeably about horse-racing, rugby, rowing, boxing and wrestling. He was also capable of forceful action when required: walking home late one night in Auckland, he buttoned his overcoat over his clerical collar and intervened decisively in an altercation between a lone policeman and three assailants in an unlit alley.

McKeefry's lifelong interest in New Zealand history, and particularly the beginnings of the church in New Zealand, was reflected in his work arranging the Auckland diocesan archives and in editing Fishers of Men (1938), a selection of translations from the writings of Bishop Pompallier and his fellow missionaries. McKeefry's writing as a journalist was informed by listening to late-night news broadcasts on shortwave radio. As a bishop he retained the habit of reading, working, or conversing late into the night - sometimes to the consternation of friends, who could match neither his limited need for sleep nor his exceptionally retentive memory.

== Death ==
On 18 November 1973, while making arrangements by telephone at the presbytery for the accommodation of a convalescent priest whom he had just visited, McKeefry died suddenly, a cigarette smouldering between his fingers. He was buried in Karori cemetery after a funeral attended by numerous civic and ecclesiastical dignitaries and amidst copious tributes from within and beyond his own church. He was succeeded by Reginald Delargey.

== Sources ==
- van der Krogt, Christopher. "McKeefry, Peter Thomas Bertram 1899 – 1973". Dictionary of New Zealand Biography. Ministry for Culture and Heritage.
- Peter Thomas Cardinal McKeefry, Catholic Hierarchy (Retrieved 12 February 2011)

Catholic Church titles
Preceded by –	Coadjutor Archbishop of Wellington; 1947–1954	Succeeded by –
Preceded by Thomas O'Shea SM	3rd Archbishop of Wellington; 1954–1973	Succeeded by Reginald Delargey
