= Walburgisgymnasium =

School in Menden (Sauerland), Germany

Coordinates: 51.441°N 7.795°E

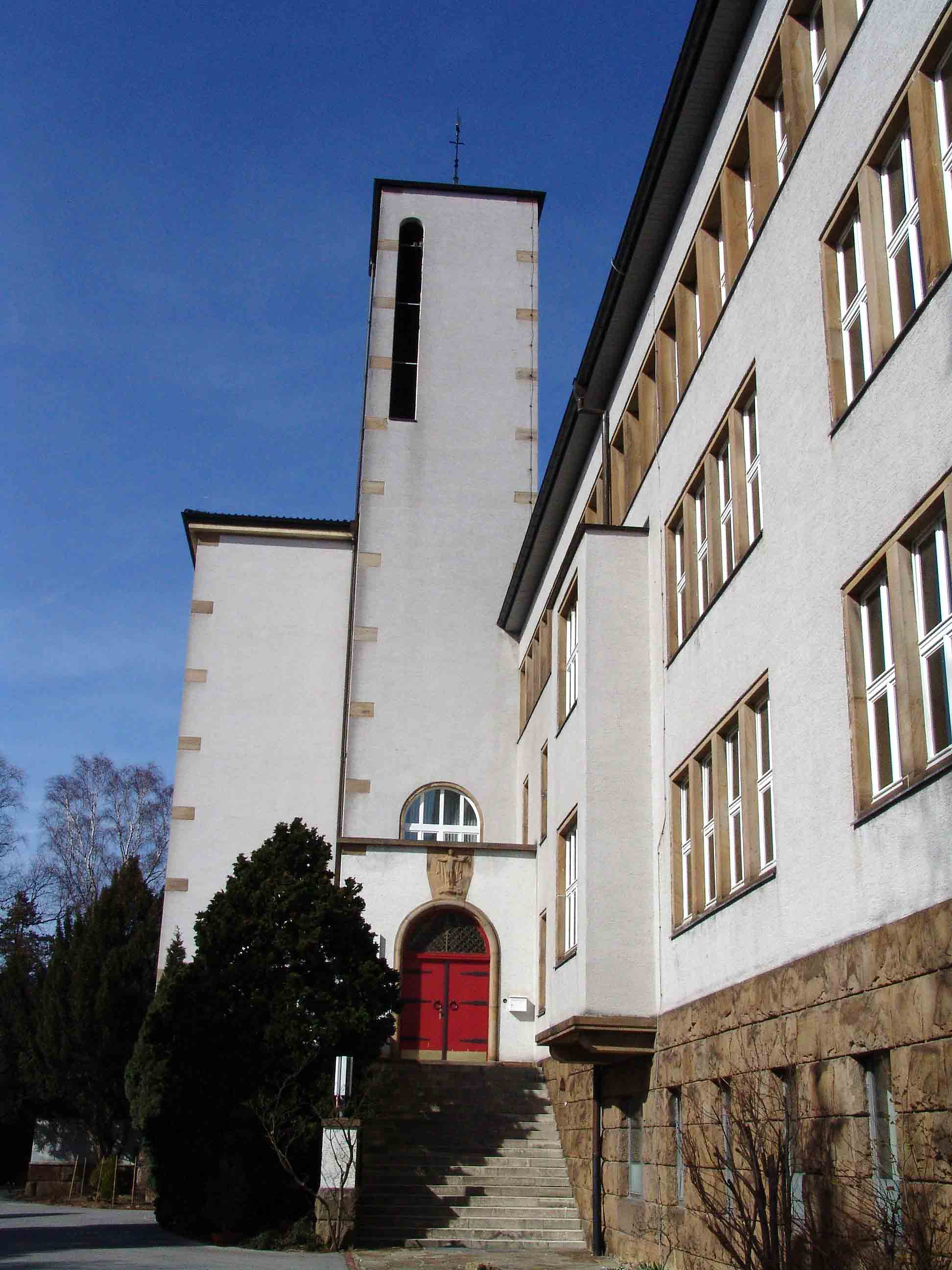

Location
- Schwitter Weg 22; Menden, North Rhine-Westphalia, 58706; Germany

Information
- Founded: 1919
- Website: https://walburgisgymnasium.smmp.de/

The Walburgisgymnasium is a private secondary school located in Menden (Sauerland), Germany with 1,200 pupils and 78 teachers. The order is based in Bestwig.

== History ==
It was founded as a girls' gymnasium in 1919, and became co-educational by having its first intake of boys in 1975.

== Community ==
=== Teacher ===
- Director: Sr. Maria Thoma SMMP

=== Parents ===
- Chairman:

=== Friends ===
- Chairman: Reinhold Jacobs (Förderverein)
