= Reginald Delargey =

New Zealand Catholic cardinal (1914-1979)

His Eminence Reginald Delargey
- Cardinal, Archbishop of Wellington
- Archdiocese: Wellington
- Installed: 1974
- Term ended: 29 January 1979
- Predecessor: Peter McKeefry
- Successor: Thomas Williams
- Other post: Cardinal-Priest of Immacolata al Tiburtino

Orders
- Ordination: 19 March 1938
- Consecration: 27 February 1958
- Created cardinal: 24 May 1976 by Paul VI
- Rank: Cardinal-Priest

Personal details
- Born: 10 December 1914 Timaru, New Zealand
- Died: 29 January 1979 (aged 64) Auckland, New Zealand
- Buried: Wellington's Sacred Heart Cathedral

Styles of Reginald Delargey
- Reference style: His Eminence
- Spoken style: Your Eminence
- Informal style: Cardinal
- See: Wellington

Reginald John Delargey (10 December 1914 – 29 January 1979) was the Roman Catholic Bishop of Auckland, and later Cardinal, Archbishop of Wellington and Metropolitan of New Zealand. His title was Cardinal-Priest of Immacolata al Tiburtino.

== Early life ==
Reginald Delargey was born in Timaru, one of six children. The family moved several times during Delargey's early years, and Delargey was sent to Auckland to receive his secondary education as a boarder at Sacred Heart College. His mother died in 1929, three years before Delargey commenced his studies for the priesthood at Holy Cross College, Mosgiel, where his considerable academic potential was recognised and he was sent to Rome to complete his studies at the Pontifical Urbaniana University.

== Priesthood ==
Delargey was ordained as a priest for the Diocese of Auckland in Rome on 19 March 1938. After returning to New Zealand, he worked in the parish of Takapuna and at St Patrick's Cathedral, Auckland. From 1940 to 1947 he was Director of Catholic Social Services for the Diocese of Auckland. He also served as director of the Catholic Youth Movement and was the chaplain at St Peter's College for 18 years. In 1953, he was awarded the Queen Elizabeth II Coronation Medal.

== Bishop of Auckland ==
Delargey was appointed as Auxiliary Bishop for the Diocese of Auckland on 25 November 1957. During his time as Auxiliary Bishop he attended all four sessions of the Second Vatican Council (Vatican II). Twelve years after his appointment as Auxiliary, Delargey was appointed as Bishop of Auckland on 18 September 1970 following the retirement of Archbishop James Liston.

As bishop, he adopted a humble and open style of leadership, putting into practice the ideas and principles of Vatican II. After four years as Bishop of Auckland, and after the death of Cardinal Peter McKeefry he was translated to the Metropolitan See in Wellington and became its Archbishop on 25 April 1974.

== Archbishop of Wellington ==
Although not from Wellington, Delargey built a strong relationship with the people and clergy of the Archdiocese as a result of his openness, humility and sincerity. As Archbishop he continued to promote the work of the Catholic Youth Movement – as he had previously done in Auckland – and was particularly conscious of the needs of minority groups both in the Archdiocese and throughout New Zealand. Delargey was created Cardinal priest on 24 May 1976 by Pope Paul VI and received the title of Inmmacolata al Tiburtino. From 1976 to 1979 he was head of the New Zealand Catholic Bishops' Conference and played a key role in the negotiations with the government and teachers' unions that culminated in the integration of Catholic schools into the State funded system in New Zealand. Despite failing health, he participated in the conclaves of August and October 1978. He died in Auckland in 1979 and was buried from Wellington's Sacred Heart Cathedral. He was succeeded by Thomas Stafford Williams.

== Honours ==
Delargey Street in Hillsborough, Auckland was named in honour of Delargey in the early 1980s.

Catholic Church titles
Preceded by –	Auxiliary Bishop of Auckland; 1957–1970	Succeeded by –
Preceded by James Liston	Bishop of Auckland; 1970–1974	Succeeded by John Mackey
Preceded by Peter McKeefry	Archbishop of Wellington; 1974–1979	Succeeded by Thomas Stafford Williams
