= Apostolic Delegation to the Pacific Ocean =

Diplomatic Mission of the Holy See

The Apostolic Delegation to the Pacific Ocean is an ecclesiastical office of the Catholic Church. It represents the interests of the Holy See in a defined region in countries with which diplomatic relations have not yet been established. It is led by a Delegate who holds a number of other titles within the diplomatic service of the Holy See, including that of Apostolic Nuncio to New Zealand. He resides in Wellington, New Zealand.

The Holy See changed the name of the delegation responsibility for Australia and much of the Pacific several times. On 1 November 1968, the Delegation to Australia, New Zealand, and Oceania was divided into the Delegation to Australia and Papua New Guinea and the Delegation to New Zealand and Pacific Islands. When the Holy See and New Zealand established diplomatic ties, Pope Paul VI established the Nunciature to New Zealand on 20 June 1973. The next year, when Archbishop Angelo Acerbi was named to lead the delegation, his title was given inconsistently as Apostolic Delegate to the Pacific Ocean (Delegato Apostolico del l'Oceano Pacifico) and Apostolic Delegate to the Islands of the Pacific Ocean (Delegatum Apostolicum Pacifici Oceani Insularum).

Since then the Holy See has established nunciatures in several countries in the region, reducing the responsibilities of the Delegation to the Pacific Ocean. The new nunciatures include: Fiji, Nauru, the Marshall Islands, Micronesia, Vanuatu, Kiribati, Palau, and the Cook Islands. The Delegation continues to represent the Holy See in American Samoa, French Polynesia, Guam, New Caledonia, Niue, Norfolk Island, Northern Mariana Islands, Pitcairn Island, Tokelau, Tuvalu, U.S. Minor Islands, and Wallis and Futuna.

The title Apostolic Delegate to the Pacific Ocean is held by the prelate appointed Apostolic Nuncio to New Zealand; he resides in Wellington, New Zealand.

== List of papal representatives to the Pacific Ocean ==
Apostolic Delegates to Australia, New Zealand, and Oceania

- Paolo Marella (27 October 1948 – 15 April 1953)
- Romolo Carboni (28 September 1953 – 2 September 1959)
- Maximilien de Fürstenberg (21 November 1959 – 28 April 1962)
- Domenico Enrici (1 October 1962 – 21 December 1968)

Apostolic Delegate to New Zealand and Pacific Islands

- Raymond Philip Etteldorf (21 December 1968 – 21 June 1974)

Apostolic Delegate to the Pacific Ocean

- Angelo Acerbi (22 June 1974 – 14 August 1979)
- Antonio Magnoni (24 April 1980 – 22 July 1989)
- Thomas Anthony White (14 October 1989 – 27 April 1996)
- Patrick Coveney (27 April 1996 - 25 January 2005)
- Charles Daniel Balvo (1 April 2005 – 17 January 2013)
- Martin Krebs (8 May 2013 – 16 June 2018)
- Novatus Rugambwa (29 March 2019 – 27 July 2024)
- Gábor Pintér (18 June 2025 – present)
