= List of Catholic dioceses in South Pacific Conference states =

The Catholic Church in the South Sea (Oceania, excluding the national episcopal conferences of Australia, of New Zealand, each with dependencies, and of Papua New Guinea and the Solomon Islands) consists only of a variety of Latin jurisdictions, usually covering a whole island state (whether nation or overseas territory of a foreign power) or even more than one, none of which has a large enough episcopate to warrant a national episcopal conference, so they jointly form the Latin "Episcopal Conference of the [South] Pacific", headquartered in Suva (on Fiji). It comprises only:

- five transnational ecclesiastical provinces, each headed by a Metropolitan Archbishopric, with a total of eleven suffragans: eight bishoprics and -exceptionally, as those are generally exempt- three pre-diocesan (an apostolic prefecture and two independent missions)
- one exempt diocese, directly subject to the Holy See, on Tonga.

There are no proper Eastern Catholic jurisdictions or quasi-diocesan Ordinariates, but the Byzantine Rite Ukrainian Catholic Church faithful are served by the Ukrainian Catholic Eparchy of Saints Peter and Paul of Melbourne, in and for all Australia, also covering New Zealand and further Oceania.

There are no individual papal diplomatic representations to several British, French, Australian, New Zealand and US overseas possessions (strictly speaking diplomatically covered by the home countries), but the Apostolic Delegation to the Pacific Ocean, headquartered externally in Wellington, New Zealand, covers American Samoa, French Polynesia, Guam (US), New Caledonia (France), Niue (New Zealand), Norfolk Island (Australia, pastorally under its Sydney Archdiocese), Northern Mariana Islands (US), Pitcairn Islands (UK), Tokelau (NZ), the U.S. Minor Outlying Islands (pastorally served by the Archdiocese for the Military Services of the United States) and Wallis and Futuna (France). It also deals with independent Tuvalu.

There is an Apostolic Nunciature to Fiji as papal diplomatic representation (embassy level), residing in Wellington.

There is an Apostolic Nunciature to the Cook Islands, also residing in Wellington.

There is formally an Apostolic Nunciature to each of the following nations, all residing in Wellington:

- Kiribati
- Marshall Islands
- Federated States of Micronesia
- Samoa
- Tonga
- Vanuatu

== Current Latin jurisdictions ==
=== Exempt ===
- Diocese of Tonga, on and for all Tonga

=== Ecclesiastical province of Agaña ===
- Metropolitan Archdiocese of Agaña, on and for Guam (US unincorporated territory)
  - Diocese of Caroline Islands, on the Caroline Islands, for all the Federated States of Micronesia (Micronesia) and Palau
  - Diocese of Chalan Kanoa, on the Northern Mariana Islands and for the Commonwealth of the Northern Mariana Islands (U.S. territory)
  - Apostolic Prefecture of the Marshall Islands, with see at Majuro, on and for the Marshall Islands (republic)

=== Ecclesiastical Province of Nouméa ===
- Metropolitan Archdiocese of Nouméa, on and for New Caledonia (French special collectivity)
  - Diocese of Port-Vila, on and for Vanuatu, former New Hebribes
  - Diocese of Wallis et Futuna, with see at Mata-Utu, on and for Wallis et Futuna (French overseas collectivity)

=== Ecclesiastical Province of Papeete ===
- Metropolitan Archdiocese of Papeete, on and mainly for French Polynesia (French overseas collectivity), also for Pitcairn Islands (UK)
  - Diocese of Taiohae o Tefenuaenata, also in French Polynesia

=== Ecclesiastical Province of Samoa–Apia ===
- Metropolitan Archdiocese of Samoa–Apia, on and for Samoa
  - Diocese of Samoa–Pago Pago, on and for American Samoa (US)
  - Mission Sui Iuris of Funafuti, on and for Tuvalu (formerly Ellice Islands)
  - Mission Sui Iuris of Tokelau, on and for Tokelau (New Zealand)

=== Ecclesiastical Province of Suva ===
- Metropolitan Archdiocese of Suva, on and for Fiji
  - Diocese of Rarotonga, on the Cook Islands, for those and Niue (both New Zealand-associated countries)
  - Diocese of Tarawa and Nauru, with see at Tarawa on Kiribati (formerly Gilbert Islands), also for Nauru (republic).

== Defunct jurisdictions ==
There are no titular sees.

Most defunct jurisdictions have current successor sees, except

- Apostolic Vicariate of Micronesia (Micronesia).

== See also ==
- List of Catholic dioceses (structured view)
- Catholic Church in Oceania
- Catholic Church in American Samoa
- Catholic Church in Cook Island
- Catholic Church in the Federated States of Micronesia
- Catholic Church in Fiji
- Catholic Church in Guam
- Catholic Church in Kiribati
- Catholic Church in the Marshall Islands
- Catholic Church in New Caledonia
- Catholic Church in New Zealand
- Catholic Church in the Northern Marianas
- Catholic Church in Samoa
- Catholic Church in Tonga
- Catholic Church in Tuvalu
- Catholic Church in Vanuatu
- Catholic Church in Wallis and Futuna

== Sources and external links ==
- GCatholic - Episcopal Conference
- GCatholic - American Samoa
- GCatholic - Cook Island
- GCatholic - Fiji
- GCatholic - French Polynesia
- GCatholic - Guam
- GCatholic - Kiribati
- GCatholic - Marshall Islands
- GCatholic - Federated States of Micronesia
- GCatholic - New Caledonia
- GCatholic - Norfolk Island
- GCatholic - Northern Mariana Islands
- GCatholic - Pitcairn Islands
- GCatholic - Samoa (independent)
- GCatholic - Tokelau
- GCatholic - Tonga
- GCatholic - Tuvalu
- GCatholic - Vanuatu
- GCatholic - Wallis & Futuna
