= Dionisio Hisiilenapo =

Angolan Roman Catholic prelate (born 1966)

The Most Reverend Dionísio Hisiilenapo
- Bishop of Namibe, Angola
- Church: Catholic Church
- Archdiocese: Roman Catholic Archdiocese of Lubango
- See: Roman Catholic Diocese of Namibe
- Appointed: 8 July 2011
- Installed: 18 September 2011
- Predecessor: Mateus Feliciano Augusto Tomás
- Successor: Incumbent

Orders
- Ordination: 6 December 1998
- Consecration: 4 Sep 2011 by Novatus Rugambwa

Personal details
- Born: Dionísio Hisiilenapo; 6 October 1966 (age 59) Epumbu, Diocese Ondjiva, Cunene Province, Angola

Styles of Dionísio Hisiilenapo
- Reference style: His Eminence
- Spoken style: Your Eminence
- Religious style: Monsignor

Dionísio Hisiilenapo (born 6 October 1966) is an Angolan prelate of the Catholic Church who is the Bishop of the Roman Catholic Diocese of Namibe in Angola since 8 July 2011. Before then, from 6 December 1998 until he was appointed bishop, he was a priest of the Roman Catholic Diocese of Ondjiva, Angola. He was appointed bishop by Pope Benedict XVI. He was consecrated bishop in Ondjiva on 4 September 2011. He was installed at Moçâmedes, Angola on 18 September 2011.

== Early life and education ==
He was born on 6 October 1966 in Epumbu, in the Diocese of Ondjiva, Cunene Province, in southern Angola. He first studied nursing and worked as nurse at Chiulo Catholic Hospital in Chiulo. He attended the Preparatory Seminary in Lubango. He studied both Philosophy and Theology at the Major Seminary in Luanda. He holds a Licentiate in Biblical Theology, awarded by the Pontifical Gregorian University in Rome.

== Priest ==
He was ordained a priest for the diocese of Ondjiva on 6 December 1998. He served as a priest until 8 July 2011.While a priest, he served in various roles and locations including:

- Head of the Okanautoni Mission, in the Cuamato Area from1998 until 2000.
- Studies in Rome, leading to the award of a Licentiate in Biblical Theology from the Pontifical Gregorian University, from 2000 until 2003.
- Superior of the Okanautoni Mission in Cuamato from 2003 until 2008.
- Professor at the Ondjiva diocesan preparatory seminary from 2003 until 2008.
- Member of the Diocesan Commission of biblical ministry from 2003 until 2008.
- Member of the Commission of the ministry of youth and vocations and family ministry from 2003 until 2008.
- Executive Secretary of the Episcopal Conference of Angola and São Tomé (CEAST) from 2008 until 2011.
- Assistant of the Catholic Administrator Association from 2008 until 2011.
- Member of the Press Office of the CEAST, since 2008.

== Bishop ==
On 8 July 2011, Pope Benedict XVI appointed Reverend Father Dionisio Hisiilenapo of the clergy of Ondjiva and Executive Secretary of the Episcopal Conference of Angola and Sao Tome as the bishop of the diocese of Namibe, in Angola. He was consecrated at Ondjiva on 4 September 2011 by Novatus Rugambwa, Titular Archbishop of Tagaria, assisted by Fernando Guimarães Kevanu, Bishop of Ondjiva and Gabriel Mbilingi, Archbishop of Lubango. He was installed at Moçâmedes on 18 September 2011. In 2014, Bishop Dionísio Hisiilenapo laid the foundation stone for the new diocese headquarters building (Bishopric) at Moçâmedes.

== See also ==
- Catholic Church in Angola

== Succession table ==
Catholic Church titles
Preceded by Mateus Feliciano Augusto Tomás (21 March 2009 - 30 October 2010)	Bishop of Namibe (since 8 July 2011)	Succeeded by Incumbent
