= Apostolic Nunciature to New Zealand =

Diplomatic post of the Holy See

The Apostolic Nunciature to New Zealand is an ecclesiastical office of the Catholic Church in New Zealand. It is a diplomatic post of the Holy See, whose representative is called the Apostolic Nuncio with the rank of an ambassador.

The Holy See represented its interests in the region through its Delegation to Australia established on 15 April 1914 and renamed the Delegation to Australia, New Zealand and Oceania on 8 June 1947. On 1 November 1968, that was divided into two delegations: the Delegation to Australia and Papua New Guinea and the Delegation to New Zealand and Pacific Islands. The Holy See established its Nunciature to New Zealand on 20 June 1973.

The Apostolic Nuncio to New Zealand is usually also the Apostolic Nuncio to the Cook Islands, Fiji, Kiribati, the Marshall Islands, Micronesia, Nauru, Palau, Samoa, Tonga, Vanuatu and Apostolic Delegate to the Pacific Ocean upon his appointment to said nations.

== List of papal representatives ==
Apostolic Delegates to Australia
with responsibility for New Zealand

- Bonaventura Cerretti (10 May 1914 – 6 May 1917)
- Bartolomeo Cattaneo (16 May 1917 – January 1933)
- Filippo Bernardini (13 March 1933 – 10 October 1935)
- Giovanni Panico (17 October 1935 – 28 September 1948)

Apostolic Delegates to Australia, New Zealand, and Oceania

- Paolo Marella (27 October 1948 – 15 April 1953)
- Romolo Carboni (28 September 1953 – 2 September 1959)
- Maximilien de Fürstenberg (21 November 1959 – 28 April 1962)
- Domenico Enrici (1 October 1962 – 1 November 1968)

Apostolic Delegate to New Zealand and Pacific Islands

- Raymond Philip Etteldorf (21 December 1968 – 21 June 1974)

Apostolic Pro-Nuncio

- Angelo Acerbi (22 June 1974 – 14 August 1979)
- Antonio Magnoni (24 April 1980 – 22 July 1989)
- Thomas Anthony White (14 October 1989 – 27 April 1996)

Apostolic Nuncio

- Patrick Coveney (27 April 1996 – 25 January 2005)
- Charles Daniel Balvo (1 April 2005 – 17 January 2013)
- Martin Krebs (8 May 2013 – 16 June 2018)
- Novatus Rugambwa (29 March 2019 – 27 July 2024)
- Gábor Pintér (27 July 2024 – present)
