= Leopoldo Ndakalako =

Angolan Catholic prelate (born 1968)

The Most Reverend Leopoldo Ndakalako
- Bishop of Menongue, Angola
- Church: Catholic Church
- Archdiocese: Roman Catholic Archdiocese of Lubango
- See: Roman Catholic Diocese of Menongue
- Appointed: 19 March 2019
- Installed: 26 May 2019
- Predecessor: Mário Lucunde
- Successor: Incumbent

Orders
- Ordination: 14 December 1997
- Consecration: 12 May 2019 by Petar Antun Rajič
- Rank: Bishop

Personal details
- Born: Leopoldo Ndakalako; 1 December 1968 (age 57) Ohakaonde, Diocese of Ondjiva, Cunene Province, Angola

Styles of Leopoldo Ndakalako
- Reference style: Your Lordship; The Most Reverend
- Spoken style: His Lordship
- Religious style: Bishop

Leopoldo Ndakalako (born 13 December 1968) is an Angolan Catholic prelate who is the bishop of the Roman Catholic Diocese of Menongue, in Angola, since 19 March 2019. Before that, from 14 December 1997, he was a priest of the Roman Catholic Diocese of Ondjiva, Angola. He was appointed bishop by Pope Francis. He was consecrated bishop on 12 May 2019 at Ondjiva. He was installed at Menongue on 26 May 2019.

== Background and education ==
He was born on 13 December 1968 at Ohakaonde, Diocese of Ondjiva, Cunene Province in southern Angola. He attended primary schools in Mongua and Ondjiva. He then attended the preparatory course in Lubango. He studied philosophy at the Christ King Major Seminary in Huambo, from 1989 until 1993. He then studied theology at the Pontifical Urban University in Rome, between 1994 and 1997. Later, from 1999 until 2003, he undertook further studies at the same university. graduating with a Doctorate in philosophy.

== Priest ==
He was ordained a priest for the Roman Catholic Diocese of Ondjiva on 14 Dec 1997 by Fernando Guimarães Kevanu, Bishop of Ondjiva. He served in that capacity until 19 March 2019.

While a priest, he served in various roles and locations including:

- Vice-Rector of the preparatory Seminary from 1998 until 1999.
- Parochial Vicar of Nossa Senhora das Vitórias - Sé Catedral from 1998 until 1999.
- Studies for a Doctorate in philosophy at the Pontifical Urban University in Rome from 1999 until 2003.
- Rector of the preparatory Seminary of the Immaculate Heart of Mary from 2003 until 2016.
- Episcopal Vicar for Pastoral Care from 2012 until 2017.
- Vicar General of the Diocese of Ondjiva from 2017 until 2019.
- Administrator of the quasi-parish of São António Naipalala in Ondjiva between 2017 and 2019.

== Bishop ==
On 19 March 2019, Pope Francis appointed the Right Reverend Leopoldo Ndakalako, of the clergy of Ondjiva, as the new bishop of the Diocese of Menongue, in Angola.

He was consecrated at Ondjiva, on 12 May 2019 by Petar Antun Rajič, Titular Archbishop of Sarsenterum assisted by Filomeno do Nascimento Vieira Dias, Archbishop of Luanda and Pio Hipunyati, Bishop of Ondjiva. Bishop Leopoldo Ndakalako was installed at Menongue, Angola on 26 May 2019. As of 2025, he is still the local ordinary of that Catholic diocese.

== See also ==
- Catholic Church in Angola

== Succession table ==
Catholic Church titles
Preceded by Mário Lucunde (3 August 2005 - 12 March 2018)	Bishop of Menongue (since 19 March 2019)	Succeeded by Incumbent
