= Charles Daniel Balvo =

American Catholic prelate (born 1951)

The Most Reverend Charles Daniel Balvo
- Apostolic Nuncio Emeritus to Australia; Titular Archbishop of Castello
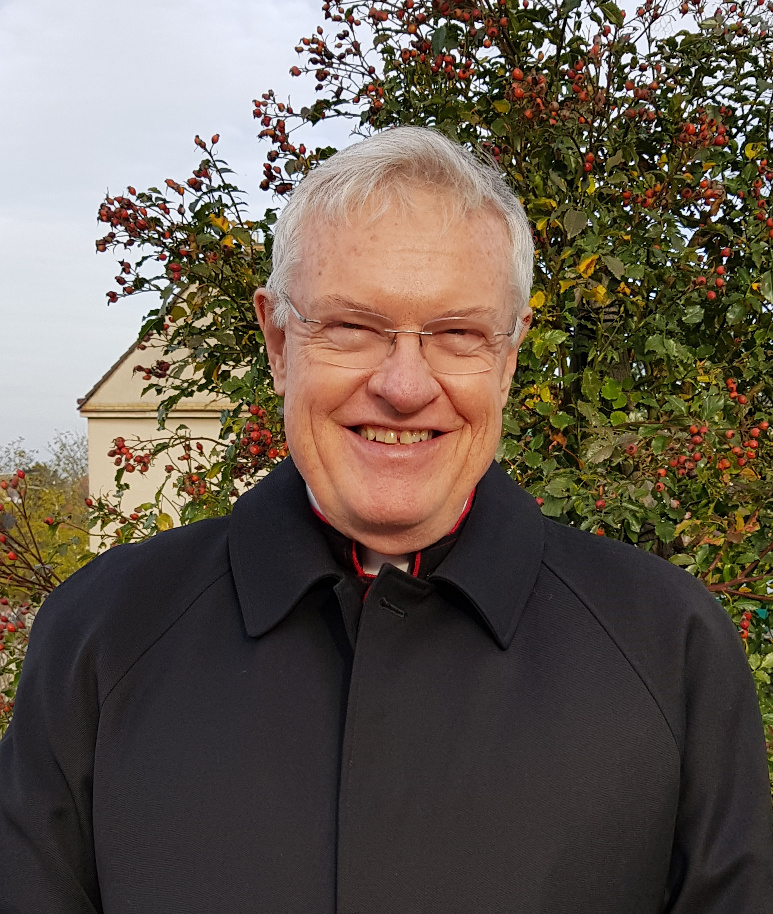
- Balvo in 2026
- Appointed: January 17, 2022
- Retired: June 30, 2026
- Predecessor: Adolfo Tito Yllana
- Previous posts: Apostolic Nuncio to the Czech Republic (2018–2022); Apostolic Nuncio to Kenya and South Sudan (2013–2018); Apostolic Nuncio to New Zealand, Fiji, Marshall Islands, Micronesia, Vanuatu, Tonga, Kiribati, Palau, Cook Islands, Samoa and Nauru (2005–2013)

Orders
- Ordination: June 6, 1976 by Leo Thomas Maher
- Consecration: June 29, 2005 by Edward Egan

Personal details
- Born: June 29, 1951 (age 75) Brooklyn, New York, US
- Education: Pontifical Gregorian University, Catholic University of America
- Motto: Fidei In Virtute
- Styles
- Reference style: His Excellency; The Most Reverend
- Spoken style: Your Excellency
- Religious style: Archbishop

Charles Daniel Balvo (born June 29, 1951) is an American Catholic prelate who served in the diplomatic service of the Holy See from 1987 to 2026. He was an apostolic nuncio and archbishop from 2005 to 2026.

== Life and career ==
=== Early years ===
A native of Brooklyn, Balvo was born on June 29, 1951. He grew up in Suffern, New York, where he graduated from Sacred Heart School. He studied at the Cathedral College of the Immaculate Conception, both in Manhattan and in Queens.

Balvo resided at the Pontifical North American College in Rome while obtaining a Bachelor of Sacred Theology degree and a Licentiate of Biblical Theology at the Pontifical Gregorian University. Returning to New York, Balvo served at Sacred Heart parish in Newburgh, New York, from 1976 to 1981, and then at St. John the Evangelist in Mahopac, New York, for a year. He obtained his Licentiate of Canon Law at the Catholic University of America in Washington, D.C., and his Doctor of Canon Law degree at the Gregorian University.

== Diplomatic career ==
On April 1, 2005, Balvo was appointed titular archbishop of Castello and apostolic nuncio to New Zealand, Fiji, the Marshall Islands, Kiribati, the Federated States of Micronesia, Tonga, Palau and Vanuatu. He received his episcopal consecration from Cardinal Edward Egan on June 29, 2005. The Cook Islands were added to Balvo's responsibilities on March 25, 2006, (Note: The Cook Islands were included in the list of nations to which Balvo was named Apostolic Nuncio on April 1, 2005, and then announced separately on March 25, 2006, suggesting that the original announcement was premature.) Samoa on April 1, 2006, and Nauru on January 30, 2007.

Balvo was appointed as apostolic nuncio to Kenya on January 17, 2013, as well as permanent observer to United Nations Organizations for the Environment and Human Settlements (UNEP and UN-Habitat). After Kenyan Cardinal John Njue denounced US President Barack Obama's call for Kenya to protect LGBTQ rights, Balvo told an audience of Kenyan Catholics that: "The homosexuals should be defended against violation of their dignity and human rights, they are human beings like anyone of us".

On December 21, 2013, Balvo was appointed the first apostolic nuncio to South Sudan as well. Speaking on the South Sudanese civil war, Balvo said civil society needs to be involved not just in negotiations on the government level but “should be actively involved always.” Speaking to CISA news agency February 17, he said civil society and the church have already asked the warring factions to lay down their arms and work out their differences, adding that in the end it is the people who are suffering. "In a country that has a lot of resources, it will not be easy to develop them unless there is peace," he said. He said the church was doing much to help people through promotion of their welfare and would continue to ensure that peace prevails in the nation. "It is very hard to promote and create a society with generations of people that all they have known is violence," he said.

On September 21, 2018, Pope Francis named Balvo as apostolic nuncio to the Czech Republic

On January 17, 2022 Pope Francis appointed him to the post of apostolic nuncio to Australia.

On June 30, 2026, Pope Leo XIV accepted his resignation after reaching the retirement age of 75.

== See also ==
- List of heads of the diplomatic missions of the Holy See

== Notes ==
Diplomatic posts
Preceded by Patrick Coveney	Apostolic Nuncio to New Zealand, Fiji, Marshall Islands, Micronesia, Vanuatu, Tonga, Kiribati, Palau, Cook Islands, Samoa and Nauru; 2005–2013	Succeeded by Martin Krebs
Preceded by Alain Paul Lebeaupin	Apostolic Nuncio to Kenya; 2013–2018	Succeeded by Hubertus van Megen
New title	Apostolic Nuncio to South Sudan; 2013–2018	Succeeded by Hubertus van Megen
Preceded by Giuseppe Leanza	Apostolic Nuncio to the Czech Republic; 2018–2022	Succeeded by Thaddeus Okolo
Preceded by Adolfo Tito Yllana	Apostolic Nuncio to Australia; 2022–2026	Vacant
