= Apostolic Nunciature to Samoa =

Diplomatic mission of the Holy See in Polynesia

The Apostolic Nunciature to Samoa is an ecclesiastical office of the Catholic Church in Samoa. It is a diplomatic post of the Holy See, whose representative is called the Apostolic Nuncio with the rank of an ambassador. The title Apostolic Nuncio to Samoa is held by the prelate appointed Apostolic Nuncio to New Zealand; he resides in Wellington, New Zealand.

The Holy See and Samoa established diplomatic relations on 10 June 1994. Before then, the Holy See was represented in Samoa by a series of delegations whose responsibilities for areas of the Pacific narrowed as the Holy See established diplomatic relations with countries in the region.

== List of papal representatives to Samoa ==
Apostolic Nuncios

- Thomas Anthony White (1994 – (27 April 1996)
  - Apostolic Delegate to the Pacific Ocean from 14 October 1989
- Patrick Coveney (27 April 1996 (Note: As recorded in the Acta Apostolicae Sedis, Coveney was given several titles on 27 April 1996, but not Samoa. But he is identified as already Apostolic Nuncio to Samoa when given additional titles on 15 October 1996.) – 25 January 2005)
- Charles Daniel Balvo (1 April 2006 – 17 January 2013)
- Martin Krebs (23 September 2013 – 16 June 2018)
- Novatus Rugambwa (17 April 2020 – 27 July 2024)
- Gábor Pintér (12 April 2025 – present)
