= Angelo Acerbi =

Catholic archbishop (born 1925)

His Eminence Angelo Acerbi
- Cardinal, Apostolic Nuncio
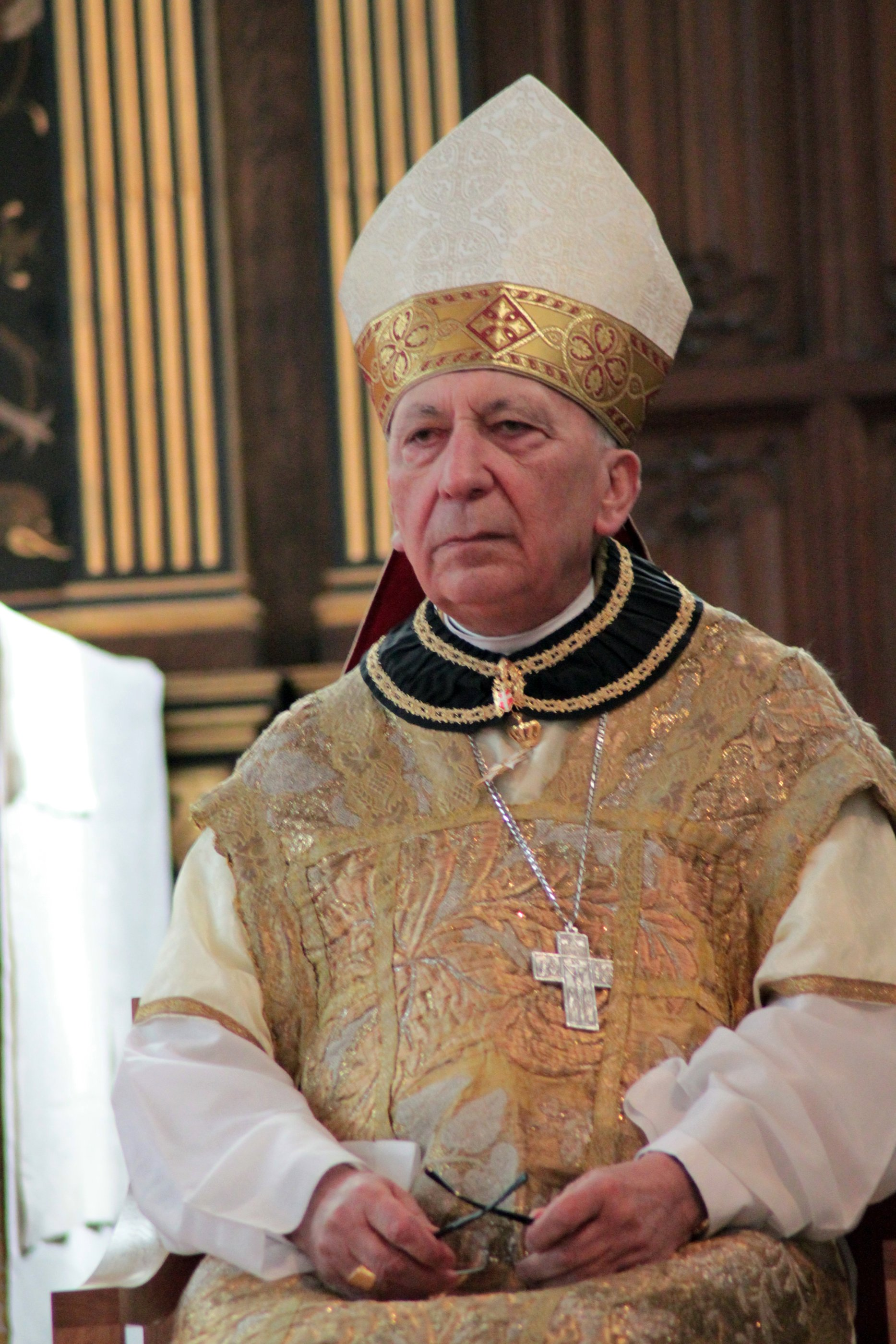
- Acerbi in 2010
- Appointed: 22 June 1974
- Retired: 27 February 2001
- Other post: Cardinal-Deacon of Santi Angeli Custodi a Città Giardino (2024–)
- Previous posts: Titular Archbishop of Zella (1974–2024); Apostolic Pro-Nuncio to New Zealand and Apostolic Delegate to the Pacific Ocean (1974–1979); Apostolic Pro-Nuncio to Fiji (1979); Apostolic Nuncio to Colombia (1979–1990); Apostolic Nuncio to Hungary and Moldova (1990–1997); Apostolic Nuncio to the Netherlands (1997–2001); Prelate of the Military Order of Malta (2001–2015)

Orders
- Ordination: 27 March 1948
- Consecration: 30 June 1974 by Pope Paul VI, Giovanni Benelli and Duraisamy Simon Lourdusamy
- Created cardinal: 7 December 2024 by Pope Francis
- Rank: Cardinal deacon

Personal details
- Born: 23 September 1925 (age 101) Sesta Godano, Kingdom of Italy
- Motto: Fide Et Lenitate
- Coat of arms

Styles of Angelo Acerbi
- Reference style: His Eminence
- Spoken style: Your Eminence
- Religious style: Cardinal
- Informal style: Cardinal

Angelo Acerbi (born 23 September 1925) is an Italian prelate of the Catholic Church, who has been an archbishop since 1974 and a cardinal since 2024. He served in the diplomatic service of the Holy See as the Apostolic Nuncio to New Zealand, the Netherlands, Colombia, Hungary, and Moldova, and as prelate of the Sovereign Military Order of Malta. He is currently the oldest living cardinal.

== Biography ==
=== Early years ===
Angelo Acerbi was born in Sesta Godano on 23 September 1925. On 27 March 1948, he was ordained a priest for the Diocese of La Spezia.

After earning a degree in canon law, he obtained his licence in theology. Having completed the course of study at the Pontifical Ecclesiastical Academy in 1954, he entered the diplomatic service of the Holy See.

=== Diplomatic career ===
He worked in the nunciatures in Colombia, Brazil, Japan and France, as well as in the International Relations Department of the Holy See's Secretariat of State. In March 1974, he was sent on a mission to Spain to ease church–state tensions over a sermon circulated by Bishop Antonio Añoveros Ataún of Bilbao advocating greater freedom for Spain's Basques.

On 22 June 1974, Pope Paul VI appointed him Archbishop of Zella in Tunisia, and apostolic pronuncio to New Zealand and apostolic delegate to the Pacific Ocean. He received episcopal consecration on 30 June from Pope Paul; the co-consecrators were archbishops Giovanni Benelli, deputy for the General Affairs of the Secretariat of State, and Duraisamy Simon Lourdusamy, secretary of the Congregation for the Evangelization of Peoples. On 6 February 1979, he was named Apostolic Pro-Nuncio to Fiji as well.

On 14 August 1979, Pope John Paul II appointed him apostolic nuncio to Colombia. On 27 February 1980, Acerbi was taken hostage along with more than a dozen other diplomats and more than forty others, when communist guerillas belonging to the 19th of April Movement assaulted the embassy of the Dominican Republic in Bogota. He was one of the last released in Havana on 28 April. Acerbi was allowed to celebrate Mass daily in captivity.

On 28 March 1990, he was transferred to Hungary, the first apostolic nuncio to be named after the establishment of communism in that country. During Acerbi's diplomatic assignment in Hungary, the Holy See concluded an agreement with the Republic of Hungary on religious assistance to the Armed Forces and the Border Police and prepared another relating to the financing of public and other purely religious activities carried out by the Catholic Church in Hungary, in particular the financing of educational activities, which was signed shortly after the end of Acerbi's tenure in Hungary. On 13 January 1994, he was also appointed Apostolic Nuncio in Moldova. On 8 February 1997 he was transferred to the nunciature in the Netherlands. On 27 February 2001, Pope John Paul II named François Bacqué to succeed him in that position, ending his career as an active nuncio.

=== Later years ===
On 2 June 2001, Pope John Paul II named Acerbi to two curial positions, member of the Congregation for the Evangelization of Peoples and member of the council of cardinals and bishops for the Section for Relations with States of the Secretariat of State. On 4 April 2002, the pope added membership in the Congregation for Bishops.

On 21 June 2001, he was appointed prelate of the Sovereign Military Order of Malta, tasked with overseeing the priestly life of its chaplains and assisting the Order's leaders in promoting the religious observance of its members. On 21 January 2006, Acerbi denounced comments published in the Italian weekly Panorama a month earlier, that said that Acerbi was leading a faction of young adherents of the Order dissatisfied with its failure to emphasize its Christian identity. On 4 July 2015, Pope Francis appointed a new prelate, Monsignor Jean Laffitte.

Acerbi was scheduled to lead a spiritual meditation during the triennial gathering of the Holy See's diplomats in September 2022.

On 7 December 2024, as announced in October, Pope Francis made Acerbi a cardinal, creating him Cardinal-Deacon of Santi Angeli Custodi a Città Giardino. He was 99 years old and became the oldest living cardinal, surpassing Estanislao Esteban Karlic. He was estimated to be "likely the oldest man ever to be named a cardinal".

Acerbi turned 100 in 2025.

== See also ==
- List of heads of the diplomatic missions of the Holy See
- Cardinals created by Francis

Catholic Church titles
Preceded by Cesare Zacchi	— TITULAR — Titular Archbishop of Zella; 22 June 1974 – 7 December 2024	Succeeded by Samuele Sangalli
Records
Preceded by Estanislao Esteban Karlic	Oldest living cardinal 7 Dec 2024 – present	Incumbent
