= Paul Augustin Mayer =

German Cardinal

His Eminence Paul Augustin Mayer, O.S.B.
- Cardinal Prefect Emeritus of the Congregation for Divine Worship and the Discipline of the Sacraments
- Other posts: Abbot of St. Michael's Abbey, Metten (1966–1971); Titular Archbishop of Satrianum (1972–1985), and Prefect of the Congregation for Divine Worship and the Discipline of the Sacraments (1985–1988)

Orders
- Ordination: 25 August 1935
- Consecration: 13 February 1972
- Created cardinal: 25 May 1985 (Cardinal deacon); 29 January 1996 (Cardinal priest)

Personal details
- Born: Paul Augustin Mayer; 23 May 1911 Altötting, Kingdom of Bavaria (now Germany)
- Died: 30 April 2010 (aged 98) Rome, Italy
- Coat of arms

Paul Augustin Mayer, OSB (23 May 1911 – 30 April 2010) was a German Cardinal of the Roman Catholic Church. He held various positions in the Roman Curia from 1971 to 1991.

== Biography ==
Mayer was born in Altötting, Germany, one of three children of Royal Bavarian General Ludwig Mayer and his wife Meta Hoeness. He was the nephew of Württemberg President Eugen Bolz.

After graduating from the Metten high school, Mayer joined the Order of Saint Benedict at the Abbey of St. Michael, Metten, taking the name of Augustin. He had his monastic profession on 17 May 1931. He studied at the University of Salzburg and at the Pontifical Athenaeum of Sant Anselmo in Rome, where he received his doctorate in theology on the writings of Clement of Alexandria.

He was ordained a Priest on 25 August 1935. After his ordination he was a faculty member at the abbey of Saint Michael from 1937 until 1939. He taught at the Pontifical Roman Athenaeum of Sant Anselmo from 1939 until 1966, serving as its rector from 1949 until 1966. As rector he founded the Pontifical Liturgical Institute.

He was the Apostolic visitor to the Swiss seminaries from 1957 until 1959. He served as Secretary of the Preparatory Commission of the Second Vatican Council from 1960 until 1962. The decree he oversaw on the formation of priests was the only Council document to be approved by the Council Fathers in the first reading. He was elected abbot of St. Michael's Abbey, Metten, Bavaria on 3 November 1966. He received the abbatial blessing from Rudolf Graber, bishop of Regensburg. In 1968 became the abbot-president of the Bavarian Benedictine Congregation, and in 1970 president of the Salzburg Conference of Abbots, positions he held until 1971.

== Episcopate ==
He was appointed Secretary of the Congregation for Religious and Secular Institutes on 8 September 1971. As secretary he was appointed titular archbishop of Satrianum by Pope Paul VI on 6 January 1972 and was consecrated on 13 February by Pope Paul, assisted by Bernardus Johannes Alfrink, Cardinal Archbishop of Utrecht, and William Conway, Cardinal Archbishop of Armagh. Pope John Paul II named him Pro-Prefect of the Congregation for Divine Worship and the Discipline of the Sacraments on 8 April 1984. During his tenure, the congregation was divided into two, the Congregation of the Sacraments and the Congregation for Divine Worship. (They were united again in 1988 under the Apostolic Constitution Pastor Bonus.)

== Cardinalate ==
He was created and proclaimed Cardinal-Deacon of Sant'Anselmo all'Aventino in the consistory of 25 May 1985. He was named full Prefect of the Congregation two days later. He presided over the unification of two distinct congregations, the Congregation of the Sacraments and the Congregation for Divine Worship that were united under one name from 1988 on. He resigned the prefecture on 1 July 1988. He was appointed the first President of the Pontifical Commission Ecclesia Dei the next day. He lost the right to participate in a conclave when turned 80 years of age in 1991. He resigned the presidency on 1 July 1991. He opted for the order of cardinal priests and his deaconry was elevated pro hac vice to title on 29 January 1996.

Mayer was the oldest living Cardinal from 2007 to his death. He died on 30 April 2010 in Rome. He was buried at St. Michael's Abbey, Metten.

In 2009, the Saint Benedict Education Foundation announced the establishment of the Paul Augustin Cardinal Mayer, O.S.B., Chair in Sacramental Theology at Sant Anselmo.

== Awards ==
- Bavarian Order of Merit
- Order of Merit of the Federal Republic of Germany

Catholic Church titles
Preceded by Ramon Iglesias i Navarri	Titular Archbishop of Satrianum; 6 January 1972 – 25 May 1985	Succeeded by Patrick Coveney
Preceded by Giuseppe Casoria	Prefect of the Congregation for Divine Worship and the Discipline of the Sacraments; 8 April 1984 – 1 July 1988	Succeeded by Eduardo Martínez Somalo
Preceded by Inaugural appointment	President of the Pontifical Commission Ecclesia Dei; 2 July 1988 – 1 July 1991	Succeeded by Antonio Innocenti
Records
Preceded by Alfons Maria Stickler	Oldest living Member of the Sacred College; 12 December 2007 – 30 April 2010	Succeeded by Ersilio Tonini
