= Pio Hipunyati =

Angolan Catholic prelate (born 1964)

The Most Reverend Pio Hipunyati
- Bishop of Ondjiva, Angola
- Church: Catholic Church
- Archdiocese: Roman Catholic Archdiocese of Lubango
- See: Roman Catholic Diocese of Ondjiva
- Appointed: 23 November 2011
- Installed: 19 February 2012
- Predecessor: Fernando Guimarães Kevanu
- Successor: Incumbent
- Other post: Apostolic Administrator of Menongue (12 March 2018 - 26 May 2019)

Orders
- Ordination: 5 December 1998
- Consecration: 19 February 2012 by Novatus Rugambwa
- Rank: Bishop

Personal details
- Born: Pio Hipunyanti; 14 November 1964 (age 61) Ounonge, Ondjiva Diocese, Cunene Province, Angola

Styles of Pio Hipunyati
- Reference style: Your Lordship; The Most Reverend
- Spoken style: His Lordship
- Religious style: Bishop

Pio Hipunyati (born 14 November 1964) is an Angolan Roman Catholic prelate who is the bishop of the Roman Catholic Diocese of Ondjiva in Angola since 23 November 2011. Before that, from 5 Dember 1998 until he was appointed bishop, he was a priest of the same Catholic diocese. He was appointed bishop by Pope Benedict XVI. He was consecrated and installed at Ondjiva on 19 February 2012. While bishop of Ondjiva, he concurrently served as apostolic administrator of the Roman Catholic Diocese of Menongue from 12 March 2018 until 26 May 2019.

== Background and education ==
Pio Hipunyati was born on 14 November 1964 at Ounonge, Ondjiva Diocese, Cunene Province in Angola. He carried his primary school education at "Catholic schools in the Dioceses of Lubango and Ondjiva". He the studied at the Sikufinde Seminary, Archdiocese of Lubango, for his preparatory course. He studied both Philosophy and Theology at the Major Seminary of the Sacred Heart of Jesus of the Archdiocese of Luanda, from 1988 until 1991. From 2006 until 2011, he studied at the Catholic University of Portugal, in Lisbon, where he graduated with a Licentiate in Canon Law and a Master's degree in Law.

== Priest ==
He was ordained a deacon on 5 July 1998. He was ordained a priest of the Archdiocese of Lubango on 5 December 1998. Later, he was incardinated in the Diocese of Ondjiva. He served as a priest until 23 November 2011.

While a priest, he served in various roles and locations including:

- Superior of the Omupanda Catholic Mission from 1999 until 2002.
- Spiritual Director of the Propedeutical Seminary of the Immaculate Heart of Mary in the Diocese of Ondjiva from 1999 until 2002.
- Treasurer of the Diocese of Ondjiva from 1998 until 2002.
- Teacher of Seminarians at his diocese who were studying in Tolentino, Italy from 2002 until 2006.
- Studies at the Catholic University of Portugal, leading to the award of a Licentiate in Canon Law and a Master's degree in Law, from 2006 until 2011.
- Superior of the Omupanda Catholic Mission during 2011.
- Professor of Latin at the Minor Seminary of Immaculate Heart of Mary, in Omupanda, during 2011.

== Bishop ==
On 23 November 2011, Pope Benedict XVI appointed Reverend Father Pio Hipunyati of the clergy of Ondjiva as the new bishop of the diocese of Ondjiva in Angola. He succeeded Bishop Fernando Guimarães Kevanu, whose age-related resignation was accepted by the Holy Father that same day. He was consecrated and installed at Ondjiva on 19 February 2012 by Novatus Rugambwa, Titular Archbishop of Tagaria assisted by Fernando Guimarães Kevanu, Bishop Emeritus of Ondjiva and Filomeno do Nascimento Vieira Dias, Bishop of Cabinda. As of 2024, he continues to serve there in that capacity. He advocates for the education and training of young people to promote economic and social development.

== See also ==
- Catholic Church in Angola

== Succession table ==
Catholic Church titles
Preceded by Fernando Guimarães Kevanu (30 January 1988 - 23 November 2011)	Bishop of Ondjiva (since 23 November 2011)	Succeeded by Incumbent
