= Mário Lucunde =

Angolan bishop (1957–2023)

His Excellency Mário Lucunde
- Bishop Emeritus of Menongue
- Archdiocese: Lubango
- Appointed: 3 August 2005
- Term ended: 12 March 2018
- Predecessor: José de Queirós Alves
- Successor: Leopoldo Ndakalako

Orders
- Ordination: 3 February 1985
- Consecration: 9 October 2005 by Oscar Lino Lopes Fernandes Braga

Personal details
- Born: 13 May 1957 Caimbambo, Portuguese Angola
- Died: 26 February 2023 (aged 65) Benguela, Angola

Mário Lucunde (13 May 1957 – 26 February 2023) was an Angolan Roman Catholic prelate.

Lucunde was born in Angola and was ordained to the priesthood in 1985. He served as bishop of the Roman Catholic Diocese of Menongue, Angola, from 2005 until his resignation in 2018.

Catholic Church titles
Preceded by José de Queirós Alves	Bishop of Menongue; 2005–2018	Succeeded by Leopoldo Ndakalako
