= Mateus Feliciano Augusto Tomás =

Angolan Roman Catholic bishop

- Bishop of Namibe
- Church: Catholic Church
- Diocese: Diocese of Namibe
- In office: 21 March 2009 – 30 October 2010
- Predecessor: Diocese erected
- Successor: Dionisio Hisiilenapo

Orders
- Ordination: 18 September 1983
- Consecration: 21 June 2009 by Giovanni Angelo Becciu

Personal details
- Born: 23 February 1958 Chinguar, Portuguese West Africa, Portuguese Empire
- Died: 30 October 2010 (aged 52) Namibe, Namibe Province, Angola

Mateus Feliciano Augusto Tomás (February 23, 1958 – October 30, 2010) was the Roman Catholic bishop of the Roman Catholic Diocese of Namibe, Angola.

Tomás was born in Chinguar, Angola. Ordained to the priesthood in 1983, he was named bishop in 2009. Tomás died in Namibe, today's Moçâmedes Angola.
