= Apostolic Nunciature to Palau =

Diplomatic Mission of the Holy See

The Apostolic Nunciature to Palau is an ecclesiastical office of the Catholic Church in Palau. It is a diplomatic post of the Holy See, whose representative is called the Apostolic Nuncio with the rank of an ambassador. The title Apostolic Nuncio to Palau is held by the prelate appointed Apostolic Nuncio to New Zealand; he resides in Wellington, New Zealand.

== List of papal representatives to Palau ==
Apostolic Nuncio

- Patrick Coveney (14 July 2001 - 25 January 2005)
- Charles Daniel Balvo (1 April 2005 - 17 January 2013)
- Martin Krebs (8 May 2013 - 16 June 2018)
- Novatus Rugambwa (25 May 2019 – 27 July 2024)
- Gábor Pintér (14 January 2025 – present)
