= Taborenta =

Roman Catholic titular see

Taborenta, Mauretania Caesariensis was a Berber civitas (town) and bishopric in Roman North Africa. It disappeared during the 7th century, and is assumed to be near Saida in modern Algeria. It was nominally restored in 1933 as a titular see.

== History ==
Taborenta was among the many towns in the Roman province of Mauretania Caesariensis of sufficient importance to become a suffragan diocese of Carthage, but completely faded, possibly at the 7th century advent of Islam. It is tentatively identified with the ruins near Saida in modern Algeria.

The only historically recorded bishop of this African diocese, Victor, took part in the Council of Carthage called in 484 by king Huneric of the Vandal Kingdom, after which he was exiled like most Catholic bishops, unlike their Donatist heretical-schismatic counterparts.

== Titular see ==
Taborenta diocese was nominally restored in 1933 as Latin titular bishopric of Taborenta (Latin = Curiate Italian) / Taborenten(sis) (Latin adjective),

The titular see has been assigned to:

- Bishop Jean-Baptiste-Adrien Llosa (1966.07.26 – resigned 1971.02.18)
- Bishop Wolfgang Rolly (1972.06.05 – death 2008.03.25)
- Archbishop Martin Krebs (2008-09-08 - present)

== See also ==
- List of Catholic dioceses in Algeria
- Catholic Church in Algeria

== Sources and external links ==
- GCatholic - (former and) titular see - consulted 22 May 2017
- catholic-hierarchy.org - flawed

Bibliography

- Pius Bonifacius Gams, Series episcoporum Ecclesiae Catholicae, Leipzig 1931, p. 468
- Stefano Antonio Morcelli, Africa christiana, Volume I, Brescia 1816, p. 293
