= Saint Joseph's Prairie Church =

Church building in Dubuque, IA

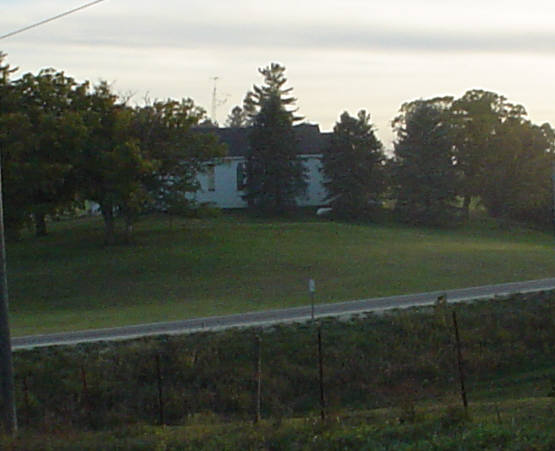
St. Joseph's Prairie Church

Saint Joseph's Prairie Church is a former Catholic parish of the Archdiocese of Dubuque. The parish was located in Washington Township, Dubuque County, Iowa - which is about ten miles south of Dubuque.

In 1843, Father T.J. Donaghoe and five Sisters of Charity of the Blessed Virgin Mary (B.V.M.) were invited to move to the Dubuque area by Bishop Mathias Loras. They moved from Philadelphia, Pennsylvania to a wooded area in nearby Table Mound Township. A chapel and a convent were built on the land. The Sisters remained in the area until their original convent was destroyed by fire. At that point the Sisters moved north to Dubuque.

After the death of Fr. Donaghoe in 1869, Bishop Hennessy of Dubuque sent Father Monaghan to establish the St. Joseph's Prairie parish. Matthew Powers, who was an area farmer, donated land for the church and cemetery. The church was built by 1875 for $4,000. A bell was added to the church, it had the distinction of being the largest bell in the Archdiocese of Dubuque. The bell weighed 5,247 pounds. For many years the bell stood in a tower at the north side of the church building. Eventually the bell was placed on a concrete platform on the church grounds. In 1894 the rectory was built for $1,500.

One of the more famous pastors of St. Joseph's was Raymond Ettledorf, who as an archbishop served as Apostolic Delegate to New Zealand, as a pro-Nuncio to Ethiopia, and as an Official of State at the Vatican.

In 1952, nearby Holy Family parish had been put under the supervision of the Archdiocese after having been the responsibility of the New Melleray Abbey for many years. St. Joseph's Prairie and Holy Family were affiliated, and shared pastors from then until the closing of the parish.

In 1989, it was decided to place the church on oratory status. The rectory was sold at this point. Most of the families were transferred over to Holy Family parish. The parish still owned the church building and grounds. For the next five years regular Sunday Masses were not celebrated at the church, but the church building could still be used on special occasions - such as weddings and funerals. In 1994, it was finally decided to permanently close the church. One last Mass was held at the old church building.

A decree was issued relegating the church to profane use - or that it was no longer a church building. The building was sold to the family that had purchased the rectory. The building has since been converted into a storage shed. The bell has since been moved from its location just north of the church, south to the church cemetery.

== See also ==
- Saint Joseph
