= Apostolic Nunciature to Australia =

Diplomatic mission of the Holy See

Coordinates: 35°19′37.69″S 149°07′35.51″E

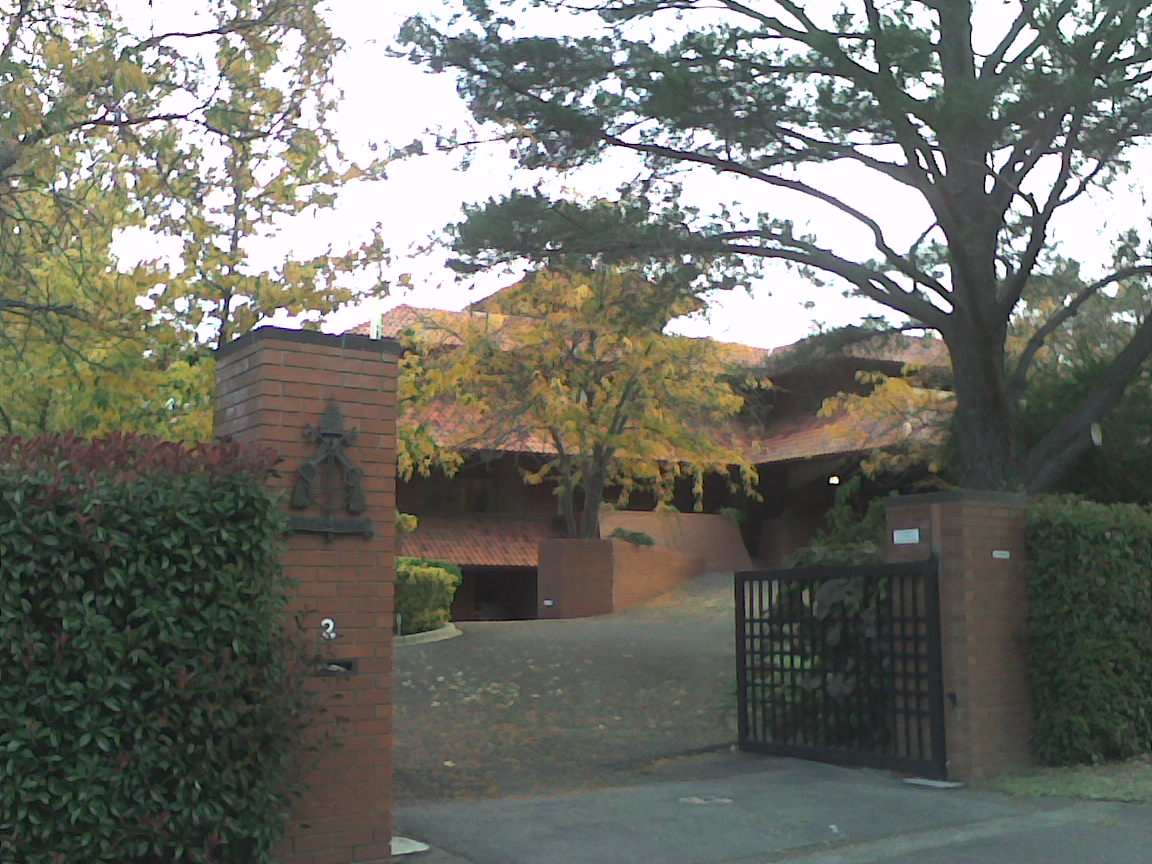
- Location: Canberra
- Address: 2 Vancouver St, Red Hill, Canberra, Australia
- Apostolic Nuncio: Charles Daniel Balvo

The Apostolic Nunciature to Australia is an ecclesiastical office of the Roman Catholic Church in Australia. It is a diplomatic post of the Holy See, whose representative is called the Apostolic Nuncio to Australia with the rank of an ambassador. The office of the nunciature is located in Red Hill, Canberra.

The mission was established as the Apostolic Delegation to Australasia by Pope Pius X on 15 April 1914 and given responsibility for Australia, Tasmania, (Note: Tasmania participated in the Federation of Australia and had been part of the Commonwealth of Australia since 1901.) and New Zealand. Bonaventura Cerretti was named its first head on 10 May. It was renamed the Delegation to Australia, New Zealand and Oceania on 8 June 1947. On 1 November 1968, that was divided into two delegations: the Delegation to Australia and Papua New Guinea and the Delegation to New Zealand and Pacific Islands. The Apostolic Nunciature to Australia was established by Pope Paul VI on 5 March 1973. Charles Daniel Balvo was appointed nuncio in January 2022 by Pope Francis.

== Papal representatives to Australia ==
Apostolic Delegates to Australasia

- Bonaventura Cerretti (10 May 1914 – 6 May 1917)
- Bartolomeo Cattaneo (16 May 1917 - January 1933)
- Filippo Bernardini (13 March 1933 – 10 October 1935)
- Giovanni Panico (17 October 1935 – 28 September 1948)

Apostolic Delegates to Australia, New Zealand, and Oceania

- Paolo Marella (27 October 1948 – 15 April 1953)
- Romolo Carboni (28 September 1953 – 2 September 1959)
- Maximilien de Fürstenberg (21 November 1959 – 28 April 1962)
- Domenico Enrici (1 October 1962 – 26 April 1969)

Apostolic Delegates to Australia and Papua New Guinea

- Gino Paro (5 May 1969 – 4 July 1973)

Apostolic Pro-Nuncios

- Gino Paro (4 July 1973 – 10 June 1978)
- Luigi Barbarito (10 June 1978 – 21 January 1986)
- Franco Brambilla (22 February 1986 – 3 December 1998)

Apostolic Nuncios

- Francesco Canalini (5 December 1998 - 8 September 2004)
- Ambrose De Paoli (18 December 2004 - 10 October 2007)
- Giuseppe Lazzarotto (22 December 2007 - 18 August 2012)
- Paul Gallagher (11 December 2012 - 8 November 2014)
- Adolfo Tito Yllana (17 February 2015 – 3 June 2021)
- Charles Daniel Balvo (22 January 2022 – 30 June 2026)

== See also ==
- List of diplomatic missions of the Holy See
- List of diplomatic missions in Australia
- Foreign relations of the Holy See
- Catholic Church in Australia
