= Profane use =

Decommissioned church building status

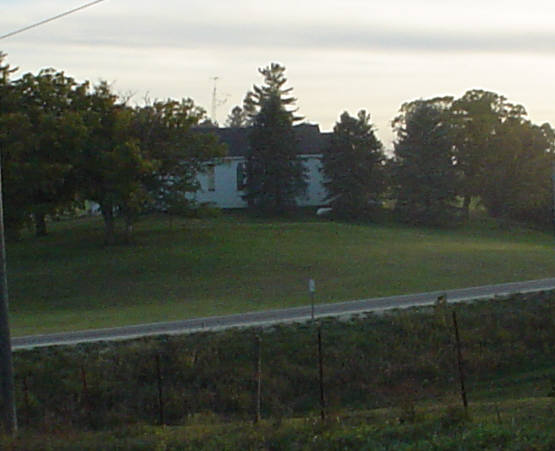
The former Saint Joseph's Prairie Church, rural Dubuque County, Iowa. The building was relegated to profane use and sold

Profane use is a term used in the Roman Catholic Church to refer to closed parish churches that will no longer be used as churches. This is often done in preparation to sell the former church building to another party. In this context, Profane does not refer to swearing, but rather to the older definition of those things that take place outside the temple.

With church buildings that are to be sold, first the sacred items (such as consecrated hosts) will be removed from the church. The Diocesan Bishop (or Archbishop) will issue a decree stating that the church building has been relegated to profane use. This has the effect of deconsecrating the church building. Once this decree has been made the building is no longer an official church building. The diocese will sell the building for any use as long as it is not sordid.

== See also ==
- Deconsecration
