= Gábor Pintér =

Hungarian prelate of the Catholic Church (born 1964)

His Excellency, The Most Reverend Gábor Pintér
- Apostolic Nuncio to New Zealand, Cook Islands, Fiji, Kiribati, Marshall Islands, Micronesia, Nauru, Palau, Samoa, Tonga, Vanuatu and Apostolic Delegate to the Pacific Ocean; Titular Archbishop of Velebusdus
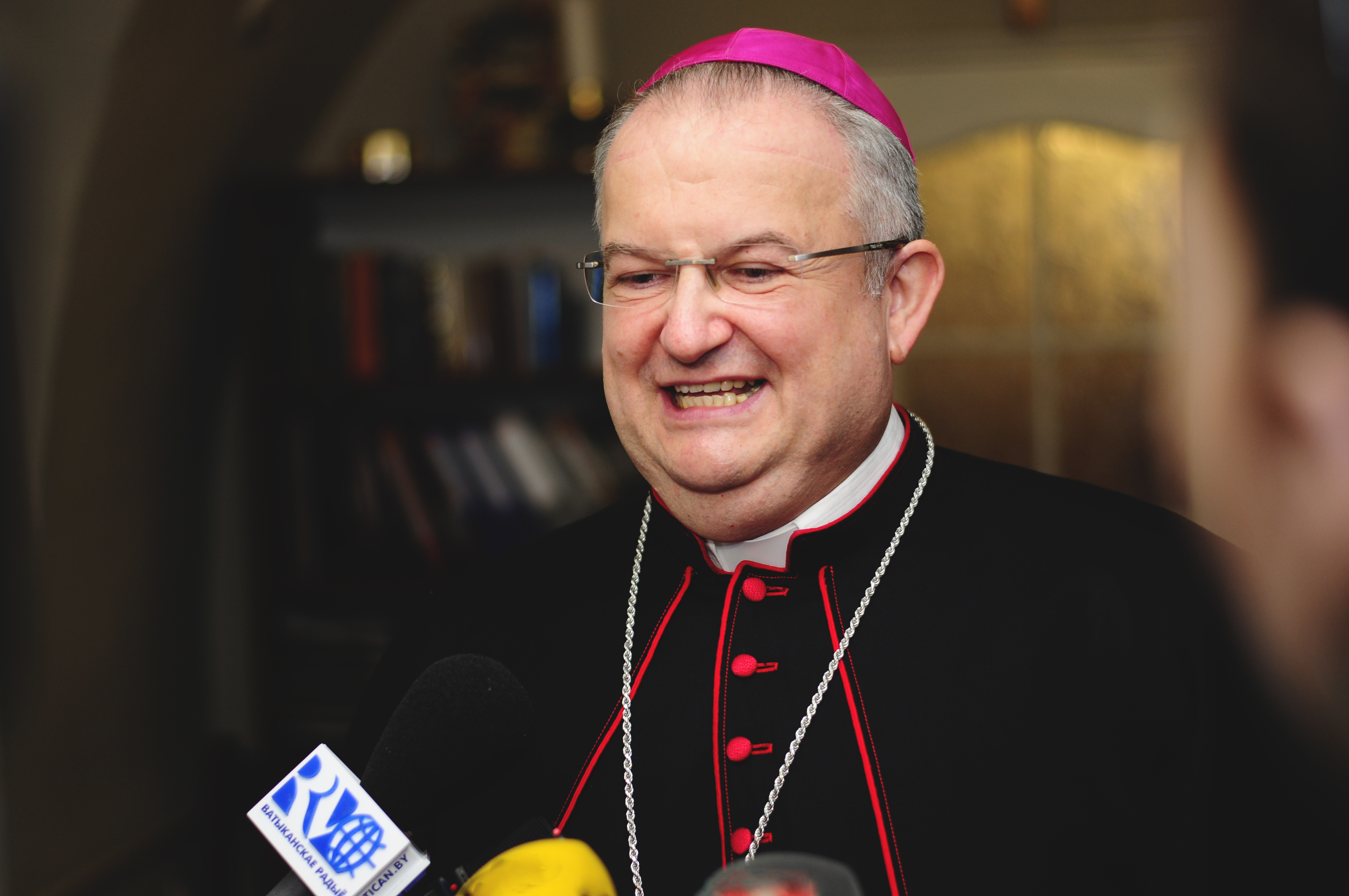
- Pintér in 2016
- Appointed: 27 July 2024
- Predecessor: Novatus Rugambwa
- Other post: Titular Archbishop of Velebusdus
- Previous posts: Apostolic Nuncio to Honduras (2019-2024); Apostolic Nuncio to Belarus (2016-2019)

Orders
- Ordination: 11 June 1988
- Consecration: 15 July 2016 by Pietro Parolin, Péter Erdő, and Miklós Beer

Personal details
- Born: March 9, 1964 (age 62) Kunszentmárton, Hungary
- Motto: Gaudium Et Spes ("Joys and Hopes")
- Coat of arms

Styles of Gábor Pintér
- Reference style: His Excellency; The Most Reverend
- Spoken style: Your Excellency
- Religious style: Archbishop

Gábor Pintér (born 9 March 1964) is a Hungarian prelate of the Catholic Church who works in the diplomatic service of the Holy See.

== Career ==
Gábor Pintér was born on 9 March 1964 in Kunszentmárton, Hungary. He was ordained a priest on 11 June 1987.

== Diplomatic career ==
He entered the diplomatic service of the Holy See on 1 July 1996 and served in Haiti, Bolivia, Sweden, France, the Philippines and Austria.

On 13 May 2016, Pope Francis named him titular archbishop of Velebusdus and Apostolic Nuncio to Belarus. He received his episcopal consecration on 15 July 2016 in the Cathedral of Vac from Cardinal Pietro Parolin, Secretary of State.

On 12 November 2019, he was appointed Apostolic Nuncio to Honduras.

On 27 July 2024, he was appointed nuncio to New Zealand.

On 29 August 2024, he was given the additional responsibilities for Fiji.

On 14 January 2025, he was given the additional responsibilities for Palau, Micronesia, and Vanuatu.

On 12 April 2025, he was given the additional responsibilities for the Cook Islands, Kiribati, the Marshall Islands, Nauru, and Samoa.

On 18 June 2025, he was given the additional responsibilities as Apostolic Delegate to the Pacific Ocean.

On 15 August 2026, he was given the additional responsibilities as nuncio to Tonga

== See also ==
- List of heads of the diplomatic missions of the Holy See
