= Antonio Magnoni =

Italian priest and theologian

Antonio Magnoni (13 June 1919 – 18 March 2007) was an Italian prelate of the Catholic Church who spent forty years of his fifty-year career in the diplomatic service of the Holy See, interrupted for a ten-year posting in the Roman Curia. He became an archbishop in 1980 and served as Apostolic Nuncio until 1995.

== Biography ==
Antonio Magnoni was born on 13 June 1919 in Nonantola, Italy, the youngest of eleven children. He studied at the Seminary of Modena and was ordained a priest on 11 April 1943.

To prepare for a diplomatic career he entered the Pontifical Ecclesiastical Academy in 1952. He joined the diplomatic service of the Holy See and was first assigned to the nunciature in Costa Rica on 1 March 1954, and then in Belgium and Chile. In 1964, he joined the staff of the Secretariat of State in Rome. On 8 April 1970, he became undersecretary of the Congregation for Divine Worship and the Discipline of the Sacraments.

On 24 April 1980, Pope John Paul II named him titular archbishop of Boseta and Apostolic Pro-Nuncio to New Zealand and to Fiji and Apostolic Delegate to the Pacific Ocean Region. He received his episcopal consecration on 1 June 1980 from Cardinal James Robert Knox.

On 22 July 1989, Pope John Paul named him Apostolic Pro-Nuncio to Egypt. He retired from that position upon the appointment of his successor, Paolo Giglio, on 25 March 1995, at the age of 75.

He died of lung cancer in Rome on 18 March 2007.
