= Novatus Rugambwa =

Tanzanian Catholic prelate (1957–2025)

His Excellency, The Most Reverend Novatus Rugambwa
- Apostolic Nuncio
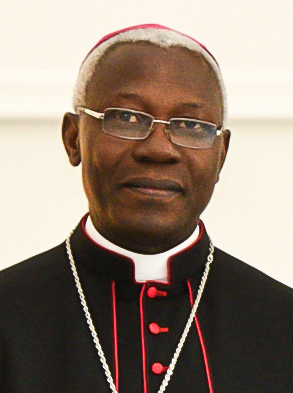
- Rugambwa in 2019
- Church: Catholic Church; Latin Church
- Appointed: 29 March 2019
- Retired: 27 July 2024
- Predecessor: Martin Krebs
- Other post: Titular Archbishop of Tagaria (2010–2025)
- Previous posts: Sub-Secretary, Pontifical Council for the Pastoral Care of Migrants and Itinerants (2007–2010); Apostolic Nuncio to Angola and to São Tomé and Príncipe (2010–2015); Apostolic Nuncio to Honduras (2015–2019)

Personal details
- Born: Novatus Rugambwa; 8 October 1957 Bukoba, Tanganyika Territory
- Died: 16 September 2025 (aged 67) Rome, Italy

Ordination history
History
Diaconal ordination
- Ordained by: Nestorius Timanywa
Priestly ordination
- Ordained by: Nestorius Timanywa
Episcopal consecration
- Principal consecrator: Tarcisio Bertone
- Co-consecrators: Pier Giorgio Micchiardi; Nestorius Timanywa
Episcopal succession
Bishops consecrated by Novatus Rugambwa as principal consecrator
- Dionísio Hisiilenapo: 2011
- Pio Hipunyati: 2012

Styles of Novatus Rugambwa
- Reference style: His Excellency; The Most Reverend
- Spoken style: Your Excellency
- Religious style: Archbishop

Novatus Rugambwa (8 October 1957 – 16 September 2025) was a Tanzanian prelate of the Catholic Church who worked in the diplomatic service of the Holy See from 1991 until he retired for health reasons in 2024. From 2010 until his death he held the titles of nuncio and archbishop.

== Biography ==
=== Early years ===
Novatus Rugambwa was born on 8 October 1957, in Bukoba, Tanganyika Territory, the second child of Benedict and Leocadia Rwechungura. He studied at Nyakatare Catholic Primary School in Bukoba from 1964 to 1968 and then at the Preparatory Seminary of Rutabo until 1971. He continued at St. Mary Minor Seminary in Rubya from 1972 to 1975 and at Itaga Minor Seminary in Tabora from 1976 to 1977. He then spent a year fulfilling the military service required of high school graduates. He studied philosophy from 1979 to 1981 at Ntungamo Regional Major Seminary and then earned his bachelor's degree in theology from the Pontifical Urban University in Rome from 1982 to 1984. He taught at St. Mary Seminary in Rubya for two years while assisting with pastoral work at Nshamba Parish. On 5 January 1986 he was ordained a deacon. He was ordained a priest on 6 July 1986 for the Diocese of Bukoba, and then served for a year as assistant priest of Nshamba Parish. From 1987 to 1991 he prepared for a diplomatic career at the Pontifical Ecclesiastical Academy while also earning a doctorate in canon law at the Pontifical Urban University.

=== Diplomatic career ===
Rugambwa entered the diplomatic service of the Holy See on 1 July 1991, and served in the pontifical diplomatic missions in Panama (1991–94), Republic of Congo (1994–97), Pakistan (1997–2000), New Zealand (2000–04), and Indonesia (2004–07). He was named undersecretary of the Pontifical Council for the Pastoral Care of Migrants and Itinerants on 28 June 2007.

On 6 February 2010 he was named titular Archbishop of Tagaria and Apostolic Nuncio to São Tomé and Príncipe. He was named Apostolic Nuncio to Angola on 20 February 2010 as well. His episcopal consecration took place on 18 March 2010; Cardinal Tarcisio Bertone was the principal consecrator, with Bishops Pier Giorgio Micchiardi and Nestorius Timanywa as principal co-consecrators.

Pope Francis named him Apostolic Nuncio to Honduras on 5 March 2015.

On 29 March 2019, Pope Francis named Rugambwa Apostolic Nuncio to New Zealand and Apostolic Delegate to the countries of the Pacific Ocean. On 25 May the responsibilities of Apostolic Nuncio to Fiji and to Palau were assigned to him. On 30 November he was given additional responsibility as Apostolic Nuncio to the Marshall Islands, Kiribati, Nauru, and Tonga. On 17 April 2020, he was named Apostolic Nuncio to Samoa as well. On 2 February 2021, Rugambwa was appointed Apostolic Nuncio to the Cook Islands, a post that had been vacant since 2018, and on 30 March to Micronesia.

=== Illness and death ===
On 29 October 2023, Rugambwa suffered a severe stroke in New Zealand. After a hospital stay and some rehabilitation there, he travelled to Rome in March 2024 to continue his rehabilitation at a Catholic facility there.

On 27 July 2024, he resigned from his positions as nuncio to New Zealand and delegate to the Pacific Ocean.

Rugambwa died at Gemelli Hospital in Rome on 16 September 2025, at the age of 67. Cardinal Parolin presided at his funeral Mass in St. Peter's Basilica on 25 September 2025.

== See also ==
- List of heads of the diplomatic missions of the Holy See

Catholic Church titles
| Preceded by José Benedito Simão | — TITULAR — Titular Archbishop of Tagaria; 6 February 2010 – 16 September 2025 | Vacant |
Diplomatic posts
| Preceded by Giovanni Angelo Becciu | Apostolic Nuncio to São Tomé and Príncipe; 6 February 2010 – 5 March 2015 | Succeeded by Petar Rajič |
| Preceded by Giovanni Angelo Becciu | Apostolic Nuncio to Angola; 20 February 2010 – 5 March 2015 | Succeeded by Petar Rajič |
| Preceded by Luigi Bianco | Apostolic Nuncio to Honduras; 5 March 2015 – 29 March 2019 | Succeeded by Gábor Pintér |
| Preceded by Martin Krebs | Apostolic Nuncio to New Zealand; 29 March 2019 – 27 July 2024 | Succeeded by Gábor Pintér |
| Preceded by Martin Krebs | Apostolic Delegate to the Pacific Ocean; 29 March 2019 – 27 July 2024 | Succeeded by Gábor Pintér |
| Preceded by Martin Krebs | Apostolic Nuncio to Fiji and Palau; 25 May 2019 – 27 July 2024 | Succeeded by Gábor Pintér |
| Preceded by Martin Krebs | Apostolic Nuncio to the Marshall Islands, Kiribati, Nauru, Tonga; 30 November 2019 – 27 July 2024 | Succeeded by Gábor Pintér |
| Preceded by Martin Krebs | Apostolic Nuncio to Samoa; 17 April 2020 – 27 July 2024 | Succeeded by Gábor Pintér |
| Preceded by Martin Krebs | Apostolic Nuncio to the Cook Islands; 2 February 2021 – 27 July 2024 | Succeeded by Gábor Pintér |
| Preceded by Martin Krebs | Apostolic Nuncio to Micronesia; 30 March 2021 – 27 July 2024 | Succeeded by Gábor Pintér |
