= Diocese of Satrianum =

Roman Catholic titular see

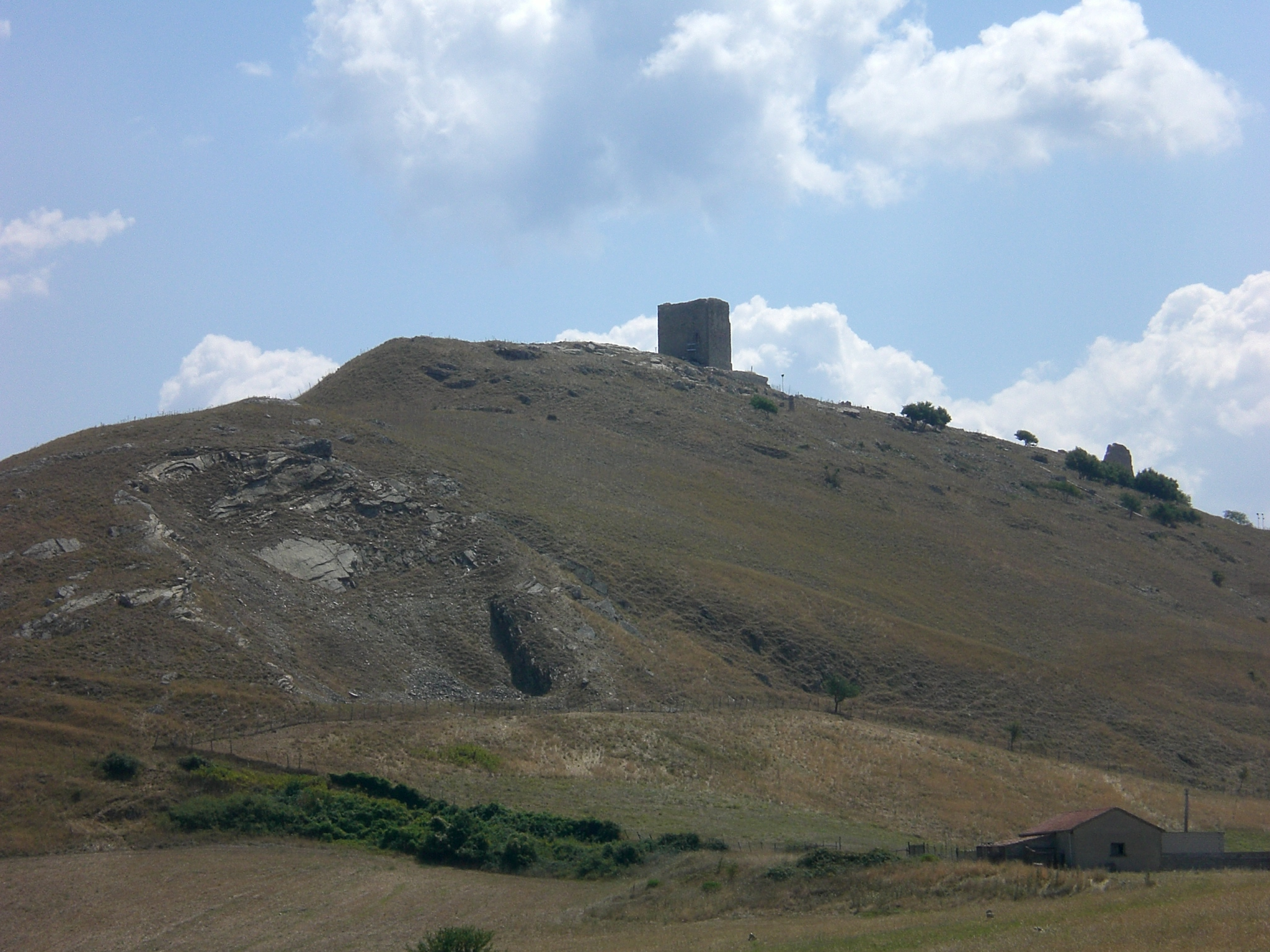
Ruins of Satriano

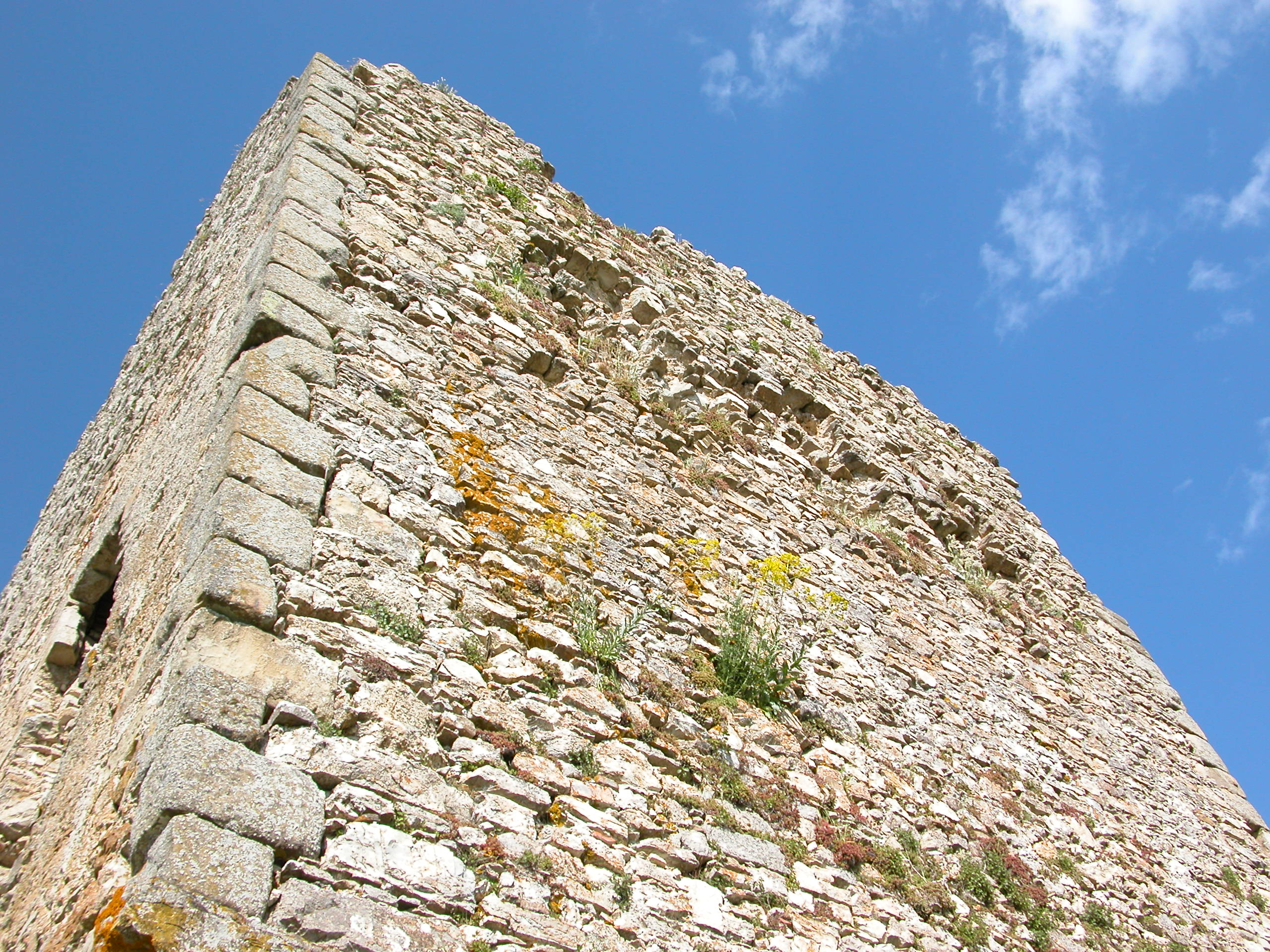
Detail of the 12th-century tower of Satriano

The Diocese of Satrianum (Latin) or Satriano (Italian) is now a Roman Catholic titular see; in other words, a former episcopal see that is no longer a geographical diocese. It takes its name from a now destroyed town situated in Lucania and was a suffragan of the metropolitan see of Salerno. The adjectival form of the Latin name of the diocese is Satrianensis. Stephanus of Byzantium called it Satria (Ancient Greek: Σατρία).

The titular archbishop until his death was Patrick Coveney.

== History ==
The diocese of Satriano was established by Pope Urban II on 20 July 1098. Its first bishop was Bishop Johannes, whose existence is attested in 1101. It continued to exist even after the destruction of the town in 1430.

The city of Satriano was completely deserted, destroyed in 1430 on orders of Queen Johanna of Naples. At the request of the Emperor Charles V, in his capacity as King of Sicily, Pope Clement VII created the diocese of Campagna on 20 May 1525, uniting it with the diocese of Satriano, aeque personaliter (two dioceses with one and the same bishop). Both were assigned to the metropolitanate of Salerno. The new bishop of Campagna was the Bishop of Satriano, Cherubino Caietani, who was installed as bishop of Campagna on 19 June 1525. The city of Campagna belonged to the Marchesi Grimaldi.

=== Extinction of the diocese ===
A concordat was signed on 16 February 1818, between Pope Pius VII and Ferdinand I of the Two Sicilies. The right of the king to nominate the candidate for a vacant bishopric was recognized, as in the Concordat of 1741, subject to papal confirmation (preconisation).

On 27 June 1818, Pius VII issued the bull De Ulteriore, in which he reestablished the metropolitan archbishopric of Conza. At the same time he abolished the diocese of Satriano, which had been united aeque principaliter with the diocese of Campagna, and incorporated the territory of Satriano into the diocese of Campagna. The diocese of Campagna was assigned to the archdiocese of Conza, in such a way that the archbishop of Conza was also the perpetual administrator of the diocese of Campagna.

=== Bishops of Satriano ===
- Johannes (attested 1101, 1108)
- Johannes (attested 1135)
- Petrus (attested 1179)
- Felix (attested 1208)

Sede vacante (February 1222)

- Nicola (attested 1223)
- Leo (1267 - 1284?)
- Laurentius ( ? - 1303)
- Franciscus (1304 – ? )
- Arduino ( ? - 1332)
- Francesco da Spoleto, O.F.M. (1332 - 1348)
- Giovanni (1348 - 1369)
- Angelo Bartolomeo (1369 - 1388?)
- Guilelmus de S. Angelo (1388 – ? ) Avignon Obedience
- Tommaso (1388 - 1419) Roman Obedience

Richardus (1401)
Cardinal Antonius Panciera (1419–1420) Administrator

- Andrea da Venezia, O.P. (1420 - 1439)
- Pietro Perili (1440 - 1442)
- Giacomo, O.S.B. (1443 - ? )
- Pietro Orseoli (1480 - 1483)
- Ladislaus (1483 - 1484)
- Giorgio, O.S.B. (1484 - 12 June 1491)
- Tommaso Attosi, O.P. (1491 - 1500)
- Agostino Orti, O.P. (1500 - 1521)
- Cherubino Caietano, O.P. (1521 - 1525)

=== Diocesan Bishops of Satriano and Campagna ===
- Cherubino Caietano, O.P. (1525 - 1544)
- Camillo Mantuato (1544 - 1560)
- Marco Lauro, O.P. (1560 - 1571)
- Girolamo Scarampi (1571 - 1583)
- Flaminio Roverella (1584 - 1589 resigned)
- Giulio Cesare Guarnieri (1591 - 1607)
- Barzellino de' Barzellini (1607 - 1618)
- Alessandro Scappi (1618 -1627)
- Costantino Testi (1628 - 1637)
- Alessandro Leparulo (1637 - 1644)

Gaspare De Simone (1644)

- Francesco Carducci (1644 - 1649)
- Maria Giuseppe Avila, O.P. (1649 - 1656)
- Juan Caramuel y Lobkowitz, O.Cist. (1657 -1673)
- Domenico Tafuri (25 September 1673 - 1679)
- Girolamo Prignano (1 March 1680 - 2 August 1697)
- Giuseppe Bondola, O.F.M.Conv. (11 December 1697 - 4 February 1713)
- Francesco Saverio Fontana (22 May 1714 - 30 September 1736)
- Giovanni Anzani (19 September 1736 - 12 February 1770)
- Nicola Ferri (28 May 1770 - 1773)
- Marco De Leone (14 June 1773 - 1793)

After the death of Marco De Leone, the see remained vacant until suppressed in 1818.

== Titular bishops and archbishops ==
- Bishop Ramón Iglesias Navarri 29 April 1969 - 11 December 1970
- Archbishop Paul Augustin Mayer, O.S.B. 6 January 1972 - 25 May 1985 (created Cardinal Deacon of Sant'Anselmo all'Aventino)
- Archbishop Patrick Coveney 27 July 1985 - 22 October 2022

== See also ==
- Roman Catholic Diocese of Satriano e Campagna

== Bibliography ==
=== Episcopal lists ===
- Eubel, Conradus, ed. (1913). Hierarchia catholica (in Latin). Vol. I (second ed.). Münster: Libreria Regensbergiana.
- Eubel, Conradus, ed. (1914). Hierarchia catholica (in Latin). Vol. II (second ed.). Münster: Libreria Regensbergiana.
- Eubel, Conradus; Gulik, Guilelmus (1923). Hierarchia catholica (in Latin). Vol. III (second ed.). Münster: Libreria Regensbergiana.
- Gams, Pius Bonifatius (1873). Series episcoporum Ecclesiae catholicae: quotquot innotuerunt a beato Petro apostolo (in Latin). Ratisbon: Typis et Sumptibus Georgii Josephi Manz. pp. 852–853.
- Gauchat, Patritius (Patrice) (1935). Hierarchia catholica (in Latin). Vol. IV (1592-1667). Münster: Libraria Regensbergiana.
- Ritzler, Remigius; Sefrin, Pirminus (1952). Hierarchia catholica medii et recentis aevi (in Latin). Vol. V (1667-1730). Patavii: Messagero di S. Antonio.
- Ritzler, Remigius; Sefrin, Pirminus (1958). Hierarchia catholica medii et recentis aevi (in Latin). Vol. VI (1730-1799). Patavii: Messagero di S. Antonio.

=== Studies ===
- Basilicata, atlante turistico. De Agostini 2006.
- Cappelletti, Giuseppe (1870). Le chiese d'Italia: dalla loro origine sino ai nostri giorni (in Italian). Vol. vigesimo (20). Venezia: G. Antonelli. pp. 535–549.
- D'Avino, Vincenzio (1848). Cenni storici sulle chiese arcivescovili, vescovili, e prelatizie (nullius) del regno delle due Sicilie (in Italian). Naples: dalle stampe di Ranucci. pp. 222–229. [article written by Bonaventura Ricotti]
- Gams, Pius Bonifatius (1873). Series episcoporum Ecclesiae catholicae: quotquot innotuerunt a beato Petro apostolo. Ratisbon: Typis et Sumptibus Georgii Josephi Manz. p. 926-927.(Use with caution; obsolete)
- Kamp, Norbert (1975). Kirche und Monarchie im staufischen Königreich Sizilien: I. Prosopographische Grundlegung, Bistumer und Bistümer und Bischöfe des Konigreichs 1194–1266: 2. Apulien und Calabrien München: Wilhelm Fink 1975.
- Kehr, Paul Fridolin (1962). Regesta pontificum Romanorum. Italia pontificia, Vol.IX: Samnium—Apulia—Lucania . ed. Walter Holtzmann. Berlin: Weidemann. (in Latin) p. 518.
- Mattei-Cerasoli, Leone (1919). "Da archivii e biblioteche: Di alcuni vescovi poco noti". (in Italian). In: Archivio storico per le province Neapolitane 44 (Napoli: Luigi Lubrano 1919). pp. 310–335.
- Moroni, Gaetano. Dizionario di erudizione storico-ecclesiastica da S. Pietro sino ai nostri giorni, vol. LXI, Venezia 1853, pp. 289–291.
- Spera, G. (1887). L'antica Satriano in Lucania. Cava dei Tirreni: 1887.
- Rivelli, Antonio Vincenzo (1894). Memorie storiche della città di Campagna. (in Italian). Salerno: Volpe 1894.
- Ughelli, Ferdinando; Coleti, Niccolo (1720). Italia sacra sive De episcopis Italiæ, et insularum adjacentium (in Latin). Vol. Tomus sextus (6). Venice: apud Sebastianum Coleti. pp. 852–854.
