= Diocese of Namibe =

Roman Catholic diocese in Angola

Coordinates: 15.1981°S 12.1553°E

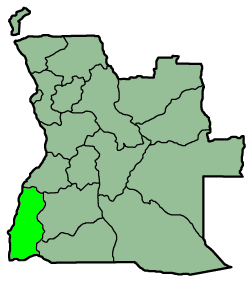

The Roman Catholic Diocese of Namibe (Latin: Dioecesis Namibanus) is a Latin diocese in the Angolan Namibe Province.

It is a suffragan in the ecclesiastical province of the Metropolitan Archdiocese of Lubango.

== Special churches ==
The cathedral episcopal see of the diocese is Sé Catedral de São Pedro (Cathedral of St. Peter, dedicated to the diocese's patron saint), in the Angolan city of Moçâmedes, capital of the Namibe province.

== History ==
- Established on 21 March 2009 as Diocese of Namibe, on territory split off from the Roman Catholic Archdiocese of Lubango, to which it is suffragan.

== Episcopal incumbents ==
(all Roman Rite)

- Bishop Mateus Feliciano Tomás (21 March 2009 – 30 October 2010, died)
- Bishop Dionisio Hisiilenapo (since 8 July 2011)

== See also ==
- Roman Catholicism in Angola

== Source - External link ==
- GCatholic.org, with incumbent biography links
