= Francisco Viti =

Angolan Roman Catholic prelate (1933–2023)

His Excellency Francisco Viti
- Archbishop Emeritus of Huambo
- Appointed: 12 September 1986
- Term ended: 31 July 2003
- Predecessor: Manuel Franklin da Costa
- Successor: José de Queirós Alves
- Previous post: Bishop of Menongue (1975–1986)

Orders
- Ordination: 14 July 1963
- Consecration: 28 September 1975 by Giovanni De Andrea

Personal details
- Born: 15 August 1933 Misasa-Evanga, Ganda, Portuguese West Africa
- Died: 15 April 2023 (aged 89) Luanda, Angola

Francisco Viti (15 August 1933 – 15 April 2023) was an Angolan Roman Catholic prelate. He was bishop of Menongue from 1975 to 1986 and archbishop of Huambo from 1986 to 2003. Viti was born on 15 August 1933, and died on 15 April 2023, at the age of 89.

Catholic Church titles
Preceded by Manuel Franklin da Costa	Archbishop of Huambo; 1986–2003	Succeeded by José de Queirós Alves
Preceded by Post created	Bishop of Menongue; 1975–1986	Succeeded by José de Queirós Alves
