= Zella (see) =

Titular see in Tunisia

Africa Proconsularis (125 AD)

The Diocese of Zella (Latin: Dioecesis Zellensis) is a suppressed and titular see of the Roman Catholic Church. The diocese of Zella, is located in today's Tunisia.

During the Roman Empire the Diocese was centered on a Roman town of the Roman province of Byzacena. During late antiquity the city had both a Donatist and Catholic congregation. These two both sent bishops to the Conference of Carthage of 411.

Today Zella survives as a titular bishopric and the current archbishop, personal title, is Samuele Sangalli, who is Adjunct Secretary of the Dicastery for Evangelization.

== Known bishops ==
- Donaziano † (fl411)
- Natalico † (fl 411) (Donatist bishop)
- Franz Brazys (1964–1967)
- Cesare Zacchi (1967–1974)
- Angelo Acerbi (1974–2024)
- Samuele Sangalli (2025–present)
