= Apostolic Nunciature to Tonga =

Diplomatic mission of the Holy See in Polynesia

- Apostolic Nuncio: Archbishop Mirosław Adamczyk

The Apostolic Nunciature to Tonga the diplomatic mission of the Holy See to Tonga. The current Apostolic Nuncio is Archbishop Novatus Rugambwa, who was named to the position by Pope Francis on 30 November 2019.

The Apostolic Nunciature to the Kingdom of Tonga is an ecclesiastical office of the Catholic Church in Tonga, with the rank of an embassy. The nuncio serves both as the ambassador of the Holy See to the King of Tonga, and as delegate and point-of-contact between the Catholic hierarchy in Tonga and the Pope.

The title Apostolic Nuncio to Tonga is held by the prelate appointed Apostolic Nuncio to New Zealand; he resides in Wellington, New Zealand.

== List of papal representatives to Tonga ==
- Patrick Coveney (27 April 1996 - 25 January 2005)
- Charles Daniel Balvo (1 April 2005 - 17 January 2013)
- Martin Krebs (18 January 2014 - 16 June 2018)
- Novatus Rugambwa (30 November 2019 – 27 July 2024)
- Gábor Pintér (15 August 2022 - present}
