= Apostolic Nunciature to Nauru =

Diplomatic post of the Holy See

The Apostolic Nunciature to Nauru is an ecclesiastical office of the Catholic Church in Nauru. It is a diplomatic post of the Holy See, whose representative is called the Apostolic Nuncio with the rank of an ambassador. The title Apostolic Nuncio to Nauru is held by the prelate appointed Apostolic Nuncio to New Zealand; he resides in Wellington, New Zealand.

Pope John Paul II established the Nunciature to Nauru on 15 May 1992.

== List of papal representatives to Nauru ==
Apostolic Nuncios

- Thomas Anthony White (1 December 1992 – (27 April 1996) (Note: White was replaced in his principal position, Apostolic Nuncio to New Zealand, on 27 April 1996.)
- Patrick Coveney (7 December 1996 – 25 January 2005)
- Charles Daniel Balvo (30 January 2007 - 17 January 2013)
- Martin Krebs (3 May 2014 - 16 June 2018)
- Novatus Rugambwa (30 November 2019 – 27 July 2024)
- Gábor Pintér (12 April 2025 – present)
