= Diocese of Menongue =

Roman Catholic diocese in Angola

Coordinates: 14.6612°S 17.6875°E

Diocese of Menongue Dioecesis Menonguensis

Location
- Country: Angola

Statistics
- Area: 199,049 km^{2} (76,853 sq mi)
- Population: Total; Catholics: 714,353; 372,908 (52.2%)
- Parishes: 16

Information
- Denomination: Catholicism
- Sui iuris church: Latin Church
- Rite: Roman
- Established: August 10, 1975
- Archdiocese: Lubango
- Cathedral: Cathedral of Our Lady of Fátima
- Secular priests: 13

Current leadership
- Bishop: Leopoldo Ndakalako

The Roman Catholic Diocese of Menongue (Latin: Dioecesis Menonguensis) is a diocese located in the city of Menongue in the ecclesiastical province of Lubango in Angola.

== History ==
- 10 August 1975: Established as Diocese of Serpa Pinto from the Diocese of Nova Lisboa and Diocese of Sá da Bandeira
- 16 May 1979: Renamed as Diocese of Menongue

== Special churches ==
The Cathedral of the diocese is Sé Catedral de Nossa Senhora de Fátima (Cathedral Church of Our Lady of Fatima) in Menongue.

== Bishops ==
=== Ordinaries, in reverse chronological order ===
- Bishops of Menongue (Roman rite), below
  - Bishop Leopoldo Ndakalako (19 March 2019–present)
  - Bishop Mário Lucunde (3 August 2005 – 12 March 2018)
  - Bishop José de Queirós Alves, C.SS.R. (12 September 1986 – 3 May 2004), appointed Archbishop of Huambo
  - Bishop Francisco Viti (16 May 1979 – 12 September 1986), appointed Archbishop of Huambo
- Bishop of Serpa Pinto (Roman rite), below
  - Bishop Francisco Viti (10 August 1975 – 16 May 1979); see above

== See also ==
- Roman Catholicism in Angola

== Sources ==
- GCatholic.org
- "Diocese of Menongue". Catholic-Hierarchy.org. David M. Cheney.
