= Raymond Philip Etteldorf =

The Most Reverend Raymond P. Etteldorf
- Church: Catholic Church
- See: Titular See of Tyndaris
- Appointed: December 21, 1968
- In office: January 6, 1969 – March 15, 1986

Orders
- Ordination: December 8, 1937
- Consecration: January 6, 1969 by Pope Paul VI

Personal details
- Born: August 18, 1911 Ossian, Iowa, US
- Died: March 15, 1986 (aged 74)

Raymond Philip Etteldorf (August 18, 1911 – March 15, 1986) was an Archbishop of the Roman Catholic Church.

Etteldorf was born in the Winneshiek County, Iowa, community of Ossian. His grandfather Philipp Etteldorf was a German immigrant from the village Schwarzenborn in the Eifel region. Bishop Etteldorf was a first cousin of the distinguished pediatrician James N. Etteldorf. Raymond Etteldorf was ordained as a priest of the Archdiocese of Dubuque on December 8, 1937. During his early career, he held various assignments in the Archdiocese of Dubuque. One of his assignments was at Saint Joseph's Prairie Church in Washington Township, about ten miles south of Dubuque. He served as the Secretary of the Prefecture for the Economic Affairs of the Holy See from 1967 to 1968.

On December 21, 1968, Etteldorf was named the Titular Archbbishop of Tyndaris, and appointed as the Apostolic Delegate to New Zealand and Pacific Islands. Ettledorf was consecrated on January 6, 1969, by Pope Paul VI. Archbishops Sergio Pignedoli, the Secretary of the Congregation for the Evangelization of Peoples, and Ernesto Civardi, the Secretary of the Sacred Consistorial Congregation, acted as co-consecrators.

Etteldorf was named Apostolic Pro-Nuncio to Ethiopia on June 21, 1974.

In October 1982 he was assigned to the Secretariat of State in Rome. On May 27, 1983, he was named a consultor of the Congregation for the Evangelization of Peoples. and on 3 October a consultor of the Congregation for the Oriental Churches.

He resigned on December 27, 1984.

Etteldorf died on March 15, 1986.
