= Cesare Zacchi =

Italian prelate (1914–1991)

Personal life
- Born: November 28, 1914 Ortignano Raggiolo, Italy
- Died: August 22, 1991 (aged 76)

Religious life
- Religion: Catholic Church

Cesare Zacchi (28 November 1914 – 22 August 1991) was an Italian prelate of the Catholic Church who worked in the diplomatic service of the Holy See. He represented the Church and the Holy See in Cuba from 1967 to 1974 and then headed the Pontifical Ecclesiastical Academy, which trains the Vatican's diplomats, from 1975 to 1985.

== Biography ==
Cesare Zacchi was born on 28 November 1914 in Ortignano Raggiolo, Italy. He was ordained a priest on 17 October 1937.

To prepare for a diplomatic career he entered the Pontifical Ecclesiastical Academy in 1948.

He worked in the Apostolic Nunciatures in Austria, Yugoslavia, Colombia, and Cuba. He had been a councilor in Cuba since 1969 when the nuncio there, Luigi Centoz, was appointed to a post in Rome on 5 July 1962. With Zacchi's appointment as interim charge d'affaires of the Nunciature to Cuba, the Vatican hoped to establish a modus vivendi under the Castro regime. Zacchi said: "My principal task is to reduce the distrust between the Cuban clergy and the government."

The Cuban government refused to recognize the Catholic bishops in Cuba as anything other than agents of a foreign entity; it therefore ignored them and dealt with Zacchi, whose position identified him as the papacy's representative. Zacchi made occasion positive remarks about the regime to gain some relaxation of government restrictions. With some success he urged the bishops to operate without antagonizing the government and endorse collaboration with government programs. Zacchi told one interviewer: "The Cuban Catholic must become part of the popular organizations of the society in which he lives. He must participate in voluntary work, he must join the militia; he must join athletic and cultural organizations. He must also take an active part in the student movement and in professional organizations. This would naturally produce a mutual influence." (Note: On 1 August 1963 Zacchi was given the title "Monsignor".)

On 16 September 1967, Pope Paul VI appointed him titular bishop of Zella. He received his episcopal consecration in Havana on 12 December 1967 from Archbishop Emanuele Clarizio, and Fidel Castro attended the reception following the ceremony.

On 24 May 1974, Pope Paul raised his rank to titular archbishop of Maura and appointed him Apostolic Nuncio to Cuba; Zacchi presented his credentials to Cuban Foreign Minister Raúl Roa on 20 December 1974.

On 1 June 1975, he was named president of the Pontifical Ecclesiastical Academy. He held that post until the appointment of his successor, Justin Francis Rigali, on 8 June 1985.

Zacchi died on 22 August 1991.
