= Apostolic Nunciature to Kiribati =

Diplomatic post of the Holy See

The Apostolic Nunciature to Kiribati is an ecclesiastical office of the Catholic Church in Kiribati. It is a diplomatic post of the Holy See, whose representative is called the Apostolic Nuncio with the rank of an ambassador. The title Apostolic Nuncio to Kiribati is held by the prelate appointed Apostolic Nuncio to New Zealand; he resides in Wellington, New Zealand.

== List of papal representatives to Kiribati ==
Apostolic Nuncios

- Thomas Anthony White (31 July 1995 – 27 April 1996)
- Patrick Coveney (15 October 1996 - 25 January 2005)
- Charles Daniel Balvo (1 April 2005 - 17 January 2013)
- Martin Krebs (8 May 2013 - 16 June 2018)
- Novatus Rugambwa (30 November 2019 – 27 July 2024)
- Gábor Pintér (12 April 2025 – present)
