= Diocese of Ondjiva =

Roman Catholic diocese in Angola

Coordinates: 17.0665°S 15.7264°E

Diocese of Ondjiva Dioecesis Ondiivana

Location
- Country: Angola

Statistics
- Area: 83,900 km^{2} (32,400 sq mi)
- Population: Total; Catholics: 1,154,410; 806,760 (69.9%)
- Parishes: 17

Information
- Denomination: Catholicism
- Sui iuris church: Latin Church
- Rite: Roman
- Established: August 10, 1975
- Archdiocese: Archdiocese of Lubango
- Cathedral: Sé Catedral de Nossa Senhora das Vitórias
- Secular priests: 33

Current leadership
- Bishop: Pio Hipunyati

Map
- Location of Cunene Province (headquarters for the diocese) within Angola

The Roman Catholic Diocese of Ondjiva (Latin: Dioecesis Ondiivanus) is a diocese located in the city of Ondjiva in the ecclesiastical province of Lubango in Angola.

== History ==
- August 10, 1975: Established as Diocese of Pereira de Eça from the Diocese of Nova Lisboa and Diocese of Sá da Bandeira
- May 16, 1979: Renamed as Diocese of Ondjiva

== Special churches ==
The Cathedral of the diocese is Sé Catedral de Nossa Senhora das Vitórias (Cathedral Church of Our Lady of Victories) in Ondjiva.

== Bishops ==
- Bishops of Ondjiva (Roman rite), in reverse chronological order
  - Bishop Pio Hipunyati (since Nov 23, 2011)
  - Bishop Fernando Guimarães Kevanu (Jan 30, 1988 - Nov 23, 2011)

=== Other priests of this diocese who became bishops ===
- Dionísio Hisiilenapo, appointed Bishop of Namibe in 2011
- Leopoldo Ndakalako, appointed Bishop of Menongue in 2019

== See also ==
- Roman Catholicism in Angola

== Sources ==
- GCatholic.org
