= Maximilian von Fürstenberg =

Roman Catholic cardinal (1904–1988)

His Eminence Maximilian von Fürstenberg
- Grand Master of the Equestrian Order of the Holy Sepulchre of Jerusalem
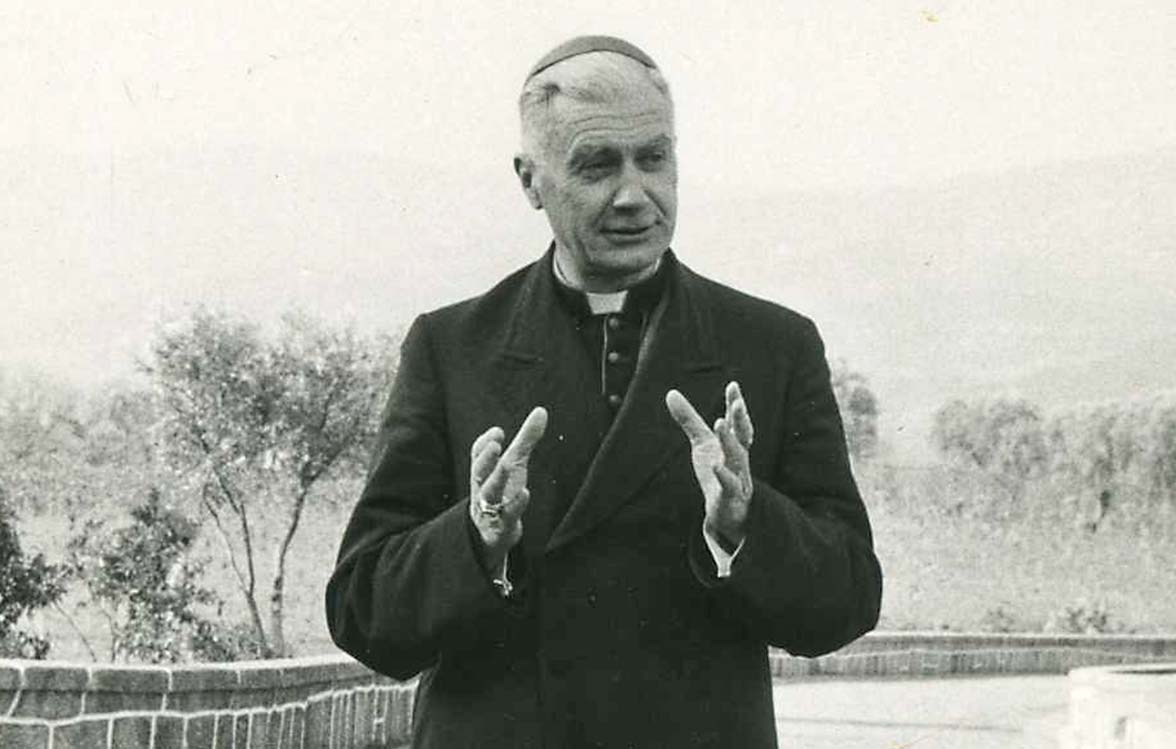
- Fürstenberg in Resende, Portugal, 1964
- Church: Catholic Church
- Appointed: March 1972
- Term ended: 22 September 1988
- Predecessor: Eugène-Gabriel-Gervais-Laurent Tisserant
- Successor: Giuseppe Caprio
- Other post: Cardinal-Priest of Sacro Cuore di Gesù a Castro Pretorio pro hac vice (1967–88)
- Previous posts: Titular Archbishop of Paltus (1949–67); Apostolic Delegate to Japan (1949–52); Apostolic Internuncio to Japan (1952–59); Apostolic Delegate to Australia (1959–62); Apostolic Delegate to New Zealand (1959–62); Apostolic Delegate to Oceania (1959–62); Apostolic Nuncio to Portugal (1962–67); Prefect of the Congregation for the Oriental Churches (1968–73); Camerlengo of the College of Cardinals (1982–84)

Orders
- Ordination: 9 August 1931
- Consecration: 25 April 1949 by Jozef-Ernest van Roey
- Created cardinal: 26 June 1967 by Pope Paul VI
- Rank: Cardinal-Priest

Personal details
- Born: Maximilian Louis Hubert Egon Vincent Marie Joseph Freiherr von Fürstenberg-Stammheim; 23 October 1904 Heerlen, Netherlands
- Died: 22 September 1988 (aged 83) Namur, Belgium
- Education: University of Louvain; Pontifical Gregorian University
- Motto: Pax et virtute Tua
- Coat of arms

Styles of Maximilian von Fürstenberg
- Reference style: His Eminence
- Spoken style: Your Eminence
- Religious style: Cardinal
- Informal style: Cardinal

Baron Maximilian Louis Hubert Egon Vincent Marie Joseph von Fürstenberg-Stammheim (also known as Maximilien de Fürstenberg; 23 October 1904 – 22 September 1988) was a cardinal of the Catholic Church and was Prefect of the Congregation for the Oriental Churches.

== Early life and education ==
He was born in the Ter Worm Castle, Heerlen, Netherlands, of the old Catholic noble family Fürstenberg-Stammheim from Westphalia, Germany. His parents were Baron Adolf Louis Egon Hubert Vincent von Fürstenberg-Stammheim (1870–1950) and Countess Elisabeth Marie Sylvie Ferdinande Joseph d'Oultremont de Wégimont de Warfusée (1879–1953).

He was educated at the Abbey college of Maredsous, Namur, Belgium from October 1915 to July 1922. He then went on study travel to Latin America and from 1922 until 1928 to the Saint-Louis College in Brussels where he studied classics and philosophy.

He did military service at the regiment of Grenadiers, and obtained the rank of sub-lieutenant of reserve. His education continued when he entered the Higher Institute of Philosophy at the University of Louvain, leaving in 1928 with a licentiate in philosophy. That same year he entered the Pontifical Gregorian University in Rome where he studied until 1932 for a doctorate in theology.

== Priesthood ==
He was ordained on 9 August 1931 and incardinated in the archdiocese of Mechelen. He returned to Belgium and became a faculty member of the diocesan College of Saint-Jean Berchmans in Antwerp from 1932 until 1934. He served as professor of liturgy at the Major Seminary, Mechelen, until 1946. Named master of ceremonies of Cardinal Jozef-Ernest van Roey, in 1934. From 1935 to 1949 he was military chaplain of reserve. On Christmas Day 1943 he was arrested by the Germans at his mother's house because of a Latin inscription placed on the Christmas candle in the metropolitan cathedral which appeared to express great hope in the Allied disembarkment in North Africa. He was subsequently sentenced to two years in prison. He was freed on Christmas Day 1944. During the Regency of Belgium, he was named chaplain of the court and decorated with the Cross of Knight of the Order of Leopold II for his patriotic conduct.

He was named by the bishops of Belgium as rector of the Belgian Pontifical College in Rome on 27 February 1946. He occupied the post until his promotion to the episcopate; among his students was the young priest Karol Wojtyla, future Pope John Paul II. He was created Domestic prelate of His Holiness on 13 May 1947.

== Episcopate and cardinalate ==
Pope Pius XII appointed him titular Archbishop of Palto on 14 March 1949 and apostolic delegate to Japan on 22 March that same year. He became Internuncio to Japan on 28 April 1952. He also served as Apostolic delegate in Australia, New Zealand and Oceania from 1959 until he was appointed Apostolic Nuncio to Portugal in 1962. He attended the Second Vatican Council from 1962 until 1965.

Coat of arms of Maximilien von Fürstenberg as Grand Master of the Order of the Holy Sepulchre

He was created and proclaimed Cardinal-Priest of Sacro Cuore di Gesù a Castro Pretorio (deaconry elevated pro hac vice to title) in the consistory of 26 June 1967 by Pope Paul VI. Pope Paul appointed him as Prefect of the Sacred Congregation for the Oriental Churches on 15 January 1968. For thirty-seven days, in coincidence with the 50th anniversary of the establishment of the Congregation in 1969, he traveled to India, Iraq, Syria, Jordan, Egypt, Turkey and the Holy Land to visit the patriarchs of the Catholic Oriental Churches and also Orthodox Ecumenical Patriarch Athenagoras I of Constantinople.

As Prefect of the Congregation for the Eastern Churches, the Cardinal was involved in a dispute between the Vatican and Ukrainian Rite Catholics, who protested what they called second-class treatment by the Vatican. In 1971, the Vatican declined to grant patriarchal status to the Ukrainian Catholic Church; Cardinal von Fürstenberg had earlier declared invalid a synod at which Ukrainian bishops voted for a patriarchal form of church administration.

Pope Paul appointed him Grand Master of the Equestrian Order of the Holy Sepulchre of Jerusalem in March 1972, a post he held until his death. He resigned the post of Prefect of the Congregation on 28 February 1973.

Cardinal von Fürstenberg took part in the conclaves that elected Pope John Paul I and Pope John Paul II in August and October 1978. He lost the right to participate in the conclave when he turned 80 years of age, in 1984. Due to bad health, he was admitted as a patient in the polyclinic "Agostino Gemelli" of Rome for several months; on 30 May 1988. Pope John Paul II visited him there. A few days later, he was transferred to the Louvain University clinic of Mont-Godinne, near Namur, Belgium.

== Death ==
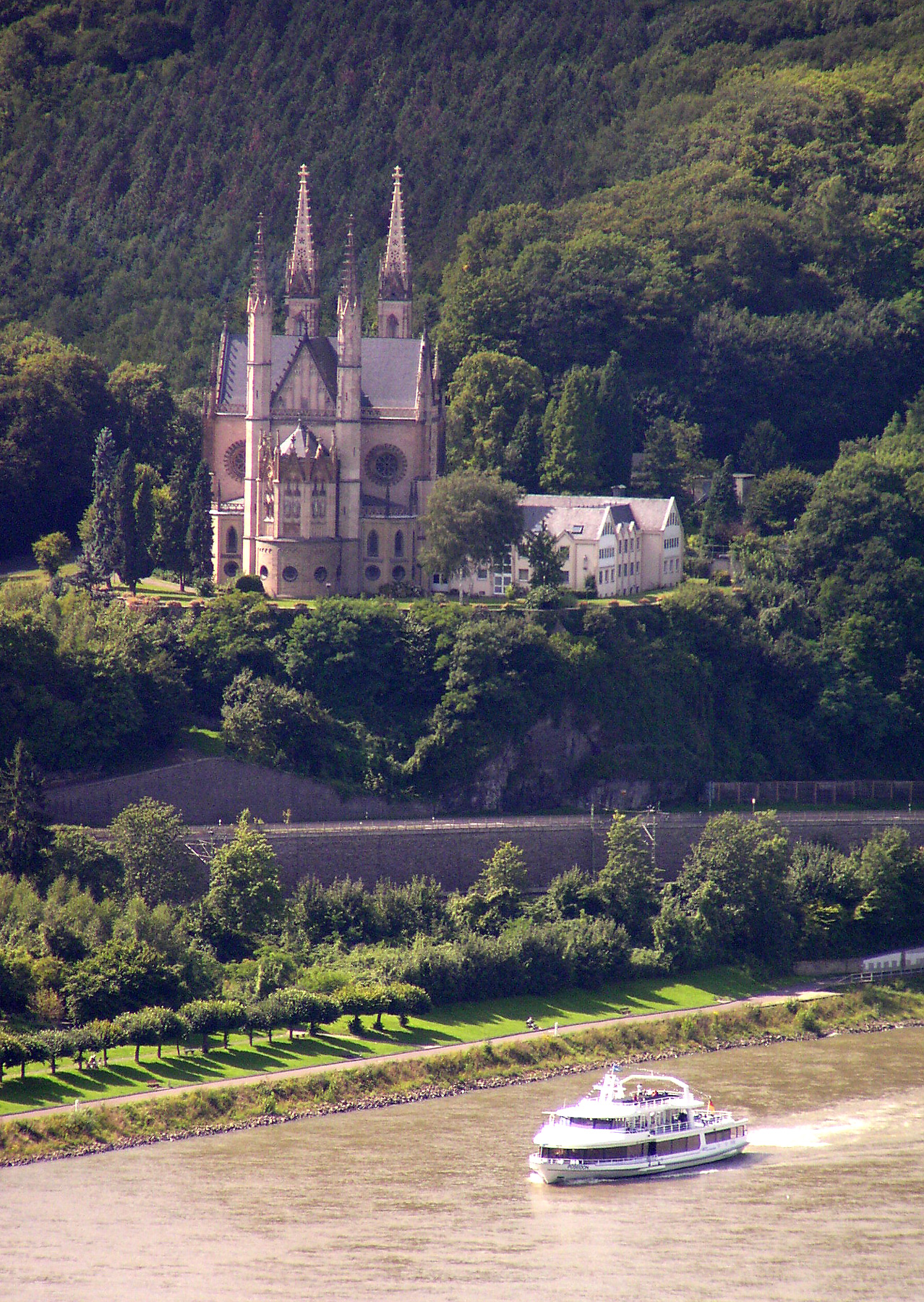
Franciscan church of Mont-Apollinaris

Cardinal von Fürstenberg died in Belgium in 1988 of a cerebral hemorrhage. The funeral was celebrated on Wednesday 28 September 1988 in the Church of Our Lady of Victories at the Sablon in Brussels, which is the capitular church of the Belgian lieutenancy of the Order of the Holy Sepulchre. His coffin was covered with the Belgian flag and surmounted with the red biretta. The following day, in accordance with his last will, he was buried in the crypt of the Franciscan church of Mont-Apollinaris at Remagen, Germany, that his great-grandfather, Count Franz Egon von Fürstenberg-Stammheim (1797–1859), had built.

Catholic Church titles
Preceded by Gustavo Testa	Prefect of the Sacred Congregation for the Oriental Churches; 15 January 1968 – 28 February 1973	Succeeded by Paul-Pierre Philippe
Preceded by Eugène-Gabriel-Gervais-Laurent Tisserant	Grand Master of the Equestrian Order of the Holy Sepulchre of Jerusalem; 1972 – 22 September 1988	Succeeded by Giuseppe Caprio
