= Fernando Guimarães Kevanu =

Angolan Roman Catholic bishop (1936–2022)

His Excellency Fernando Guimarães Kevanu
- Bishop Emeritus of Ondjiva
- Diocese: Ondjiva
- Appointed: 30 January 1988
- Term ended: 23 November 2011
- Successor: Pio Hipunyati

Orders
- Ordination: 2 July 1970
- Consecration: 3 July 1988 by Alexandre do Nascimento

Personal details
- Born: 14 August 1936 Odime, Portuguese West Africa
- Died: 18 May 2022 (aged 85) Ondjiva, Angola

Fernando Guimarães Kevanu (14 August 1936 – 18 May 2022) was an Angolan Roman Catholic bishop.

Guimarães Kevanu was born in Angola. He was ordained to the priesthood in 1970. He was named bishop of the Roman Catholic Diocese of Ondjiva, Angola in 1988 and served until his retirement in 2011.

Catholic Church titles
Preceded by Post created	Bishop of Ondjiva; 1988–2011	Succeeded by Pio Hipunyati
