= Apostolic Nunciature to the Cook Islands =

Diplomatic post of the Holy See

The Apostolic Nunciature to the Cook Islands is an ecclesiastical office of the Catholic Church in the Cook Islands. It is a diplomatic post of the Holy See, whose representative is called the Apostolic Nuncio with the rank of an ambassador. The title Apostolic Nuncio to the Cook Islands is held by the prelate appointed Apostolic Nuncio to New Zealand; he resides in Wellington, New Zealand. The current Nuncio is Novatus Rugambwa, since 2 February 2021.

== List of papal representatives to the Cook Islands ==
Apostolic Nuncios

- Patrick Coveney (14 July 2001 – 25 January 2005)
- Charles Daniel Balvo (25 March 2006 – 17 January 2013)
- Martin Krebs (8 May 2013 – 16 June 2018)
- Novatus Rugambwa (2 February 2021 – 27 July 2024)
- Gábor Pintér (12 April 2025 – present)
