= Apostolic Nunciature to the Marshall Islands =

Diplomatic post of the Holy See

The Apostolic Nunciature to the Marshall Islands is an ecclesiastical office of the Catholic Church in the Marshall Islands. It is a diplomatic post of the Holy See, whose representative is called the Apostolic Nuncio with the rank of an ambassador. The title Apostolic Nuncio to the Marshall Islands is held by the prelate appointed Apostolic Nuncio to New Zealand; he resides in Wellington, New Zealand.

Pope John Paul II established the Nunciature to the Marshall Islands on 30 December 1993.

== List of papal representatives to the Marshall Islands ==
Apostolic Nuncios

- Patrick Coveney (27 April 1996 – 25 January 2005)
- Charles Daniel Balvo (1 April 2005 – 17 January 2013)
- Martin Krebs (3 May 2014 – 16 June 2018)
- Novatus Rugambwa (30 November 2019 – 27 July 2024)
- Gábor Pintér (12 April 2025 – present)
