= Thomas A. White =

Irish prelate of the Catholic Church (1931–2012)

His Excellency, The Most Reverend Thomas A. White
- Apostolic Nuncio Emeritus of Fiji; Titular Archbishop of Sabiona
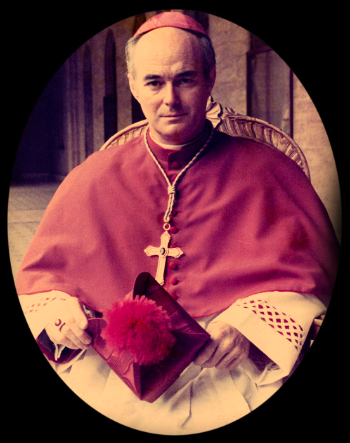
- Appointed: 2 May 1978
- Term ended: 28 February 1983
- Predecessor: Nicola Rotunna
- Successor: Patrick Coveney
- Other post: Titular Archbishop of Sabiona (1978–2017)
- Previous posts: Apostolic Pro-Nuncio to New Zealand, Nauru, Apostolic Delegate to the Oceania (1989–1996); Apostolic Nuncio to Ethiopia (1983–1989); Apostolic Nuncio to Rwanda (1978–1983)

Orders
- Ordination: 25 February 1956 by Clemente Micara
- Consecration: 15 September 1985 by Cardinal Agnello Rossi, Bishop Donal Herlihy, and Bishop Peter Birch

Personal details
- Born: 12 August 1931 Durrow, County Laois, Ireland
- Died: 7 May 2017 (aged 85) Kilkenny, Ireland
- Buried: St Mary's Cathedral, Kilkenny

Styles of Thomas A. White
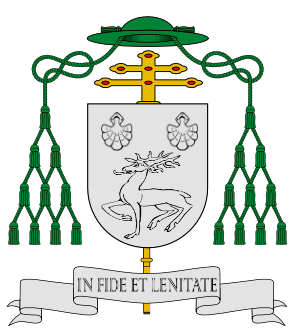
- Archbishop Thomas A White Coat of Arms
- Reference style: His Excellency; The Most Reverend
- Spoken style: Your Excellency
- Religious style: Archbishop

Thomas A. White (12 August 1931 – 7 May 2017) was an archbishop of the Catholic Church who served in the diplomatic service of the Holy See in Europe, Africa, South America and Asia. Consecrated bishop in Rome 30th July 1978, he once described his career as "gypsy for the sake of the Kingdom".

== Biography ==
Thomas Anthony White was born in Durrow, County Laois, Irish Free State, on 12 August 1931, one of five children. He attended Cullohill National School and then St Kieran's College, Kilkenny, where he excelled in academics and hurling. White was ordained to the priesthood on 25 February 1956 and briefly taught canon law at St. Kieran's.

To prepare for a diplomatic career he entered the Pontifical Ecclesiastical Academy in 1958. His first assignment took him to Nairobi, where the Apostolic Delegation to Eastern Africa was preparing for developing diplomatic relations with the countries of the region as they achieved their independence. He later worked in Latin America and Switzerland. His last staff assignment was in China, first on the mainland and then in the nunciature's new location in Taiwan.

On 27 May 1978, Pope Paul VI appointed him titular archbishop of Sabiona and served apostolic nuncio to Rwanda. He received his episcopal consecration on 30 July 1978 from Cardinal Agnelo Rossi

On 1 March 1983, Pope John Paul II named him Apostolic Pro-Nuncio to Ethiopia. Famine relief was the central occupation of his time there. He suffered a heart attack in 1988.

On 14 October 1989, he was appointed Apostolic Pro-Nuncio to New Zealand and Fiji as well as Apostolic Delegate to Oceania. On 1 December 1992, he received the additional title of Apostolic Nuncio to Nauru. On 31 July 1995 he was named Apostolic Nuncio to Kiribati as well.

He left the diplomatic service upon his replacement in several of his posts by Patrick Coveney on 27 April 1996.

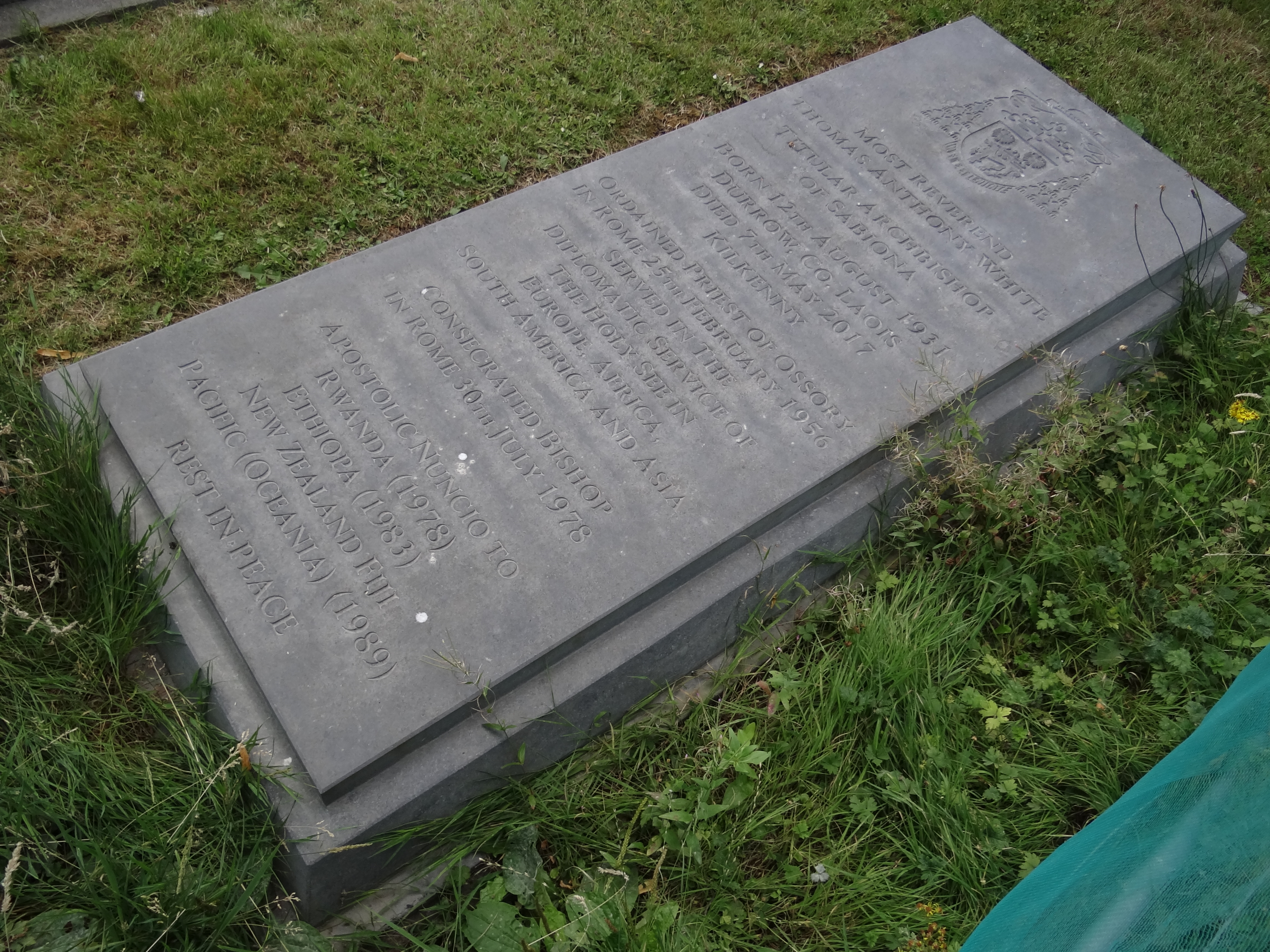
White's grave on the grounds of St. Mary's Cathedral, Kilkenny

In retirement he lived in Blackrock, a Dublin suburb, and continued to fill special assignments for the Vatican Secretariat of State. He settled finally at a nursing home in Kilkenny where he died on 7 May 2017.
