= Apostolic Nunciature to Fiji =

Diplomatic post of the Holy See

The Apostolic Nunciature to Fiji is an ecclesiastical office of the Catholic Church in Fiji. It is a diplomatic post of the Holy See, whose representative is called the Apostolic Nuncio with the rank of an ambassador. The title Apostolic Nuncio to Fiji is held by the prelate appointed Apostolic Nuncio to New Zealand; he resides in Wellington, New Zealand.

== List of papal representatives to Fiji ==
Apostolic Pro-Nuncios

- Angelo Acerbi (6 February 1979 – 14 August 1979)
- Antonio Magnoni (24 April 1980 - 22 July 1989)
- Thomas Anthony White (14 October 1989 - 27 April 1996)

Apostolic Nuncio

- Patrick Coveney (15 October 1996 - 25 January 2005)
- Charles Daniel Balvo (1 April 2005 - 17 January 2013)
- Martin Krebs (23 September 2013 - 16 June 2018)
- Novatus Rugambwa (25 May 2019 – 29 August 2024)
- Gábor Pintér (29 August 2024 – present)
