= Domenico Enrici =

Italian prelate

The Most Reverend Domenico Enrici
- Official of the Secretariat of State
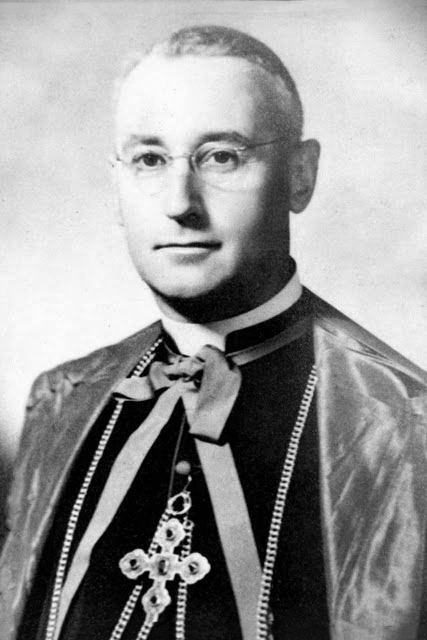
- Church: Roman Catholic
- Appointed: 16 July 1973
- Term ended: 1 December 1979
- Other post: Titular Archbishop of Ancusa (1955–97)
- Previous posts: Apostolic Delegate to Great Britain (1969–73); Apostolic Delegate to Australia and Papua New Guinea (1968–69); Apostolic Delegate to Australia, New Zealand and Oceania (1962–68); Apostolic Internuncio to Japan (1960–62); Apostolic Nuncio to Haiti (1958–60); Apostolic Interuncio to Indonesia (1955–58)

Orders
- Ordination: 29 June 1933 by Quirico Travaini
- Consecration: 1 November 1955 by Giovanni Battista Montini

Personal details
- Born: 9 April 1909 Cervasca San Stefano, Italy
- Died: 3 December 1997 (aged 88) Cervasca, Italy

Domenico Enrici (9 April 1909 – 3 December 1997) was an Italian prelate of the Catholic Church who spent his career in the diplomatic service of the Holy See.

== Biography ==
Domenico Enrici was born on 9 April 1909 in Cervasca, Province of Cuneo, Italy. He was ordained a priest of the Diocese of Cuneo on 29 June 1933.

To prepare for a career in the diplomatic service of the Holy See he completed the course of study at the Pontifical Ecclesiastical Academy in 1935. His early assignments included a stint in Ireland beginning in 1938 and in Taiwan in the mid 1950s.

On 17 September 1955, Pope Pius XII appointed him Titular Archbishop of Ancusa and Apostolic Internuncio to Indonesia. Giovanni Montini, the Archbishop of Milan, consecrated him a bishop on 1 November. On 30 January 1958, he was named Apostolic Nuncio to Haiti. Pope John XXIII appointed him Apostolic Internuncio to Japan on 5 January 1960. On 1 October 1962, Pope John named him Apostolic Delegate to Australia, New Zealand, and Oceania.

He participated in the first and third sessions of Second Vatican Council.

On 26 April 1969, Pope Paul VI appointed him Apostolic Delegate to Great Britain. He snubbed Mervyn Stockwood, Church of England Bishop of Southwark, at a charity dinner because Stockwood had praised the work of birth control clinics.

On 16 July 1973, he joined the staff of the Secretariat of State, but his work was not limited to Rome. He was described as a "roving ambassador ... on an inspection trip" when he visited Taiwan in February 1974. He represented the Holy See at the enthronement of Spain's King Juan Carlos and the coronation of the Central African Empire's Emperor Bokassa. He was also acting president of the Pontifical Ecclesiastical Academy in 1974–1975.

He retired on 1 December 1979. He died on 3 December 1997.
