= Martin Krebs =

German prelate of the Catholic Church (born 1956)

His Excellency, The Most Reverend Martin Krebs
- Apostolic Nuncio of Switzerland, Liechtenstein and Monaco, Titular Archbishop of Taborenta
- Appointed: 3 March 2021; 19 April 2024 (Monaco)
- Predecessor: Thomas Gullickson; Antonio Arcari (Monaco)
- Other post: Titular Archbishop of Taborenta
- Previous posts: Apostolic Nuncio to Uruguay (2018-2021); Apostolic Nuncio to the Cook Islands, Kiribati, Micronesia, New Zealand, Palau, Fiji, Samoa, Vanuatu, Tonga, Marshall Islands, Nauru and Apostolic Delegate to the Pacific Ocean (2013-2018); Apostolic Nuncio to Guinea and Mali (2008-2013)

Orders
- Ordination: 10 October 1983 by Friedrich Wetter
- Consecration: 16 November 2008 by Tarcisio Bertone, Erwin Josef Ender, and Felix Genn

Personal details
- Born: November 2, 1956 (age 69) Essen, West Germany
- Motto: BEATI MISERICORDES
- Coat of arms

Styles of Martin Krebs
- Reference style: His Excellency; The Most Reverend
- Spoken style: Your Excellency
- Religious style: Archbishop

Martin Krebs (born 2 November 1956) is a German prelate of the Catholic Church who has worked in the diplomatic service of the Holy See since 1991. He has been an archbishop since 2008 when he received the first of several postings as a papal nuncio.

== Biography ==
Martin Krebs was born in Essen, Germany, on 2 November 1956. He was ordained to the priesthood there on 10 October 1983. He entered the diplomatic service of the Holy See on 1 July 1991, and held posts in Burundi, Japan, Austria, the Czech Republic, the European Community and the United States.

He is fluent in English, Italian, French, Spanish and Czech.

== Diplomatic career ==
On 8 September 2008, Pope Benedict XVI named him titular archbishop of Taborenta and Apostolic Nuncio to Guinea and Mali. He welcomed the assignment, describing Guinea as "a predominantly Islamic country in which Islam is not lived fanatically".

On 8 May 2013, Pope Francis appointed him Apostolic Nuncio to New Zealand, the Cook Islands, Kiribati, Palau, and Micronesia, as well as Apostolic Delegate to the Pacific Ocean. He received his episcopal consecration from Cardinal Tarcisio Bertone on 16 November. On 23 September, Francis added Fiji, Samoa and Vanuatu to his responsibilities. On 18 January 2014, he added Tonga as well, and on 3 May the Marshall Islands and Nauru. While fulfilling this array of assignments he used Wellington, New Zealand, as his base. On several occasions he played a role in the affairs of the troubled Archdiocese of Agaña on Guam, trying to reconcile disputing parties in 2014, receiving a report that Archbishop Anthony Apuron had sodomized a boy years earlier in 2015, and trying without success to persuade Apuron to resign in 2016.

On 16 June 2018, Francis named Krebs Apostolic Nuncio to Uruguay.

On 3 March 2021, Krebs was reassigned as Nuncio to Switzerland and Liechtenstein.

With the possibility of same-sex marriage in Liechtenstein, Krebs reportedly refused to get involved in the disagreement between Archbishop Wolfgang Haas and the Landtag, saying it is up to Haas and MPs to resolve the conflict, “I see no basis for the Holy See to intervene."

On 19 April 2024, Pope Francis appointed him also as Nuncio to Monaco.

== See also ==
- List of heads of the diplomatic missions of the Holy See
