= Apostolic Nunciature to the Federated States of Micronesia =

Diplomatic post of the Holy See

The Apostolic Nunciature to the Federated States of Micronesia is an ecclesiastical office of the Catholic Church in the Federated States of Micronesia. It is a diplomatic post of the Holy See, whose representative is called the Apostolic Nuncio with the rank of an ambassador. The title Apostolic Nuncio to the Federated States of Micronesia is held by the prelate appointed Apostolic Nuncio to New Zealand; he resides in Wellington, New Zealand.

Pope John Paul II established the Nunciature to Micronesia on 26 January 1994.

== List of papal representatives to the Federated States of Micronesia ==
Apostolic Nuncios

- Patrick Coveney (15 October 1996 – 25 January 2005)
- Charles Daniel Balvo (1 April 2005 – 17 January 2013)
- Martin Krebs (8 May 2013 – 16 June 2018)
- Novatus Rugambwa (30 March 2021 – 27 July 2024)
- Gábor Pintér (14 January 2025 – present)
