= Apostolic Nunciature to Vanuatu =

Diplomatic mission of the Holy See in Oceania

The Apostolic Nunciature to Vanuatu is an ecclesiastical office of the Catholic Church in Vanuatu. It is a diplomatic post of the Holy See, whose representative is called the Apostolic Nuncio with the rank of an ambassador. The title Apostolic Nuncio to Vanuatu is usually held by the prelate appointed Apostolic Nuncio to New Zealand; he resides in Wellington, New Zealand.

== List of papal representatives to Vanuatu ==
Apostolic Nuncios

- Patrick Coveney (15 October 1996 – 25 January 2005)
- Charles Daniel Balvo (1 April 2006 – 17 January 2013)
- Martin Krebs (23 September 2013 – 16 June 2018)
- Gábor Pintér (14 January 2025 – present)
