= Tagaria =

Africa Proconsularis (125 AD)

Tagaria was a Roman-Berber town in the province of Africa Proconsularis and in Late Antiquity of Byzacena. It was located in the Sahel area in Tunisia.

The town was also the seat of an ancient bishopric, which remains a titular see of the Roman Catholic Church. The most recent bishop Novatus Rugambwa died on 16 September 2025.
