= Romolo Carboni =

Italian prelate

- Apostolic Nuncio to Italy
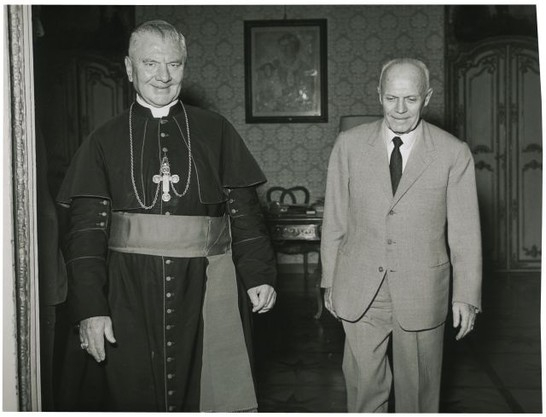
- Romolo Carboni Sandro Pertini (left)
- Church: Catholic Church
- In office: 26 April 1969 – 19 April 1986
- Predecessor: Egano Righi-Lambertini
- Successor: Luigi Poggi
- Other post: Titular Archbishop of Sidon (1953-1999)
- Previous posts: Apostolic Nuncio to Peru (1959-1969); Apostolic Delegate to Australia, New Zealand and Oceania (1953-1959)

Orders
- Ordination: 31 March 1934
- Consecration: 25 October 1953 by Pietro Fumasoni Biondi

Personal details
- Born: 9 May 1911 Fano, Province of Pesaro and Urbino, Kingdom of Italy
- Died: 2 September 1999 (aged 88) Fano, Province of Pesaro and Urbino, Italy

Romolo Carboni (9 May 1911 – 2 September 1999) was an Italian prelate of the Catholic Church who devoted his entire career to the diplomatic service of the Holy See. He became an archbishop in 1953 and served as an Apostolic Nuncio from 1953 to 1986, including 17 years as Apostolic Nuncio to Italy.

== Biography ==
Romolo Carboni was born on 9 May 1911 in Fano, Italy. He was ordained a priest on 31 March 1934.

To prepare for a diplomatic career, he entered the Pontifical Ecclesiastical Academy in 1934. He joined the diplomatic service on 15 September 1937. His early assignments included postings in Haiti, the United States, and in Rome from 1945 to 1953.

On 28 September 1953, Pope Pius XII named him titular archbishop of Sidon and Apostolic Delegate to Australia, New Zealand, and Oceania. He received his episcopal consecration on 25 October 1953 from Cardinal Pietro Fumasoni Biondi. In 1961, a collection of speeches he gave while in this post was published in English as An Apostolic Delegate Speaks, with a book jacket that said "An alert, progressive Catholic archbishop speaks his mind". He was a forceful orator and fluent in English. In Australia, he was a very public advocate for lay Catholic political organisations, a position opposed by the Australian bishops. One study draws a negative picture of Carboni's status: "It is not clear that Carboni was well regarded in the Vatican.... It seems that Carboni's apparent self-promotion upset some of his clerical colleagues.... Carboni was not a big hitter in Rome." The Vatican ultimately rejected his position.

On 2 September 1959, Pope John XXIII named him Apostolic Nuncio to Peru. His support for political and Church conservatives proved controversial.

On 23 April 1969, Pope Paul VI appointed him Apostolic Nuncio to Italy.

He retired upon the appointment of his successor, Luigi Poggi, on 19 April 1986.

He died on 2 September 1999.
