= Patrick Coveney =

Irish prelate of the Catholic Church (1934–2022)

His Excellency The Most Reverend Patrick Coveney
- Apostolic Nuncio Emeritus of Greece; Titular Archbishop of Satrianum
- Appointed: 25 January 2005
- Term ended: 16 July 2009
- Predecessor: Paul Fouad Tabet
- Successor: Luigi Gatti
- Other post: Titular Archbishop of Satrianum (1985–2022)
- Previous posts: Apostolic Nuncio to the Marshall Islands, New Zealand, Samoa, Tonga, Fiji, Kiribati, Micronesia, Vanuatu, Nauru, Cook Islands and Apostolic Delegate to the Pacific Ocean (1996–2005); Apostolic Delegate to Djibouti (1992–1996); Apostolic Pro-Nuncio/Nuncio to Ethiopia and Eritrea (1990–1996); Apostolic Pro-Nuncio to Zimbabwe and Apostolic Delegate to Mozambique (1985–1990)

Orders
- Ordination: 21 February 1959 by Luigi Traglia
- Consecration: 15 September 1985 by Agostino Casaroli, Gaetano Alibrandi, and Michael Murphy

Personal details
- Born: 29 July 1934 Tracton, County Cork, Ireland
- Died: 22 October 2022 (aged 88)

Styles of Patrick Coveney
- Reference style: His Excellency; The Most Reverend
- Spoken style: Your Excellency
- Religious style: Archbishop

The Most Rev. Patrick Coveney (29 July 1934 – 22 October 2022), Titular Archbishop of Satrianum, was a senior-ranking Irish prelate of the Catholic Church who worked in the diplomatic service of the Holy See from 1966 to 2009. He became an archbishop in 1985 and fulfilled several assignments as Apostolic Nuncio, including stints in Zimbabwe, Ethiopia, New Zealand, and Greece.

== Early years ==
Archbishop Coveney was born in Tracton, County Cork, Ireland, studied at Maynooth College (obtaining the academic degree of Bachelor of Arts in classical languages and literature), and the Pontifical Irish College, Rome, Italy (obtaining the Licentiate of Sacred Theology), and was ordained, aged twenty-four, as a priest on 21 February 1959 by the archbishop vicegerent (deputy vicar general of Rome) Luigi Traglia in the Archbasilica of St. John Lateran.

After doing parish work in Kidlington, England, he taught in St. Finbarr's College, the minor seminary of the Diocese of Cork and Ross in Cork from 1960 to 1966. When use of the vernacular language was introduced into the celebration of the Roman Rite Mass, he edited a lectionary in English.

In September 1966, he went to work in the English-language section of the Secretariat of State in the Vatican. This sometimes involved acting as interpreter at audiences of Pope Paul VI, as when this Pope received the three astronauts of the Apollo 11 mission that first landed human beings on the Moon.

At the Pontifical Lateran University he obtained the degree of Doctor of Canon Law in 1969.

== Diplomatic service ==
To prepare for a diplomatic career he entered the Pontifical Ecclesiastical Academy in 1969 and entered the diplomatic service of the Holy See in 1971.

Coveney served with the rank of Secretary in the Apostolic Nunciature in Buenos Aires from 1972 to 1976, returning then to the Secretariat of State in the Vatican. He was counselor of the nunciatures in New Delhi (1982–1984) and Khartoum (1984–1985).

On 27 July 1985, he was appointed Titular Archbishop of Satrianum and Apostolic Pro-Nuncio to Zimbabwe and Apostolic Delegate to Mozambique. He was ordained to the episcopate on 15 September 1985 in the North Cathedral in Cork. The principal consecrator was Agostino Cardinal Casaroli, the Cardinal Secretary of State; the principal co-consecrators were Archbishop Gaetano Alibrandi, Apostolic Nuncio to Ireland, and Bishop Michael Murphy, Bishop of Cork and Ross. In Harare, capital of Zimbabwe, he represented the Holy See at the 8th Summit Conference of the Non-Aligned Movement (1–6 September 1986).

On 25 January 1990 he was appointed Nuncio to Ethiopia and also became Apostolic Delegate to Djibouti on 26 March 1992 and on 30 September 1995 Nuncio to Eritrea.

Coveney became Apostolic Nuncio to New Zealand, Tonga, the Marshall Islands, and Samoa, and Apostolic Delegate for Oceania on 27 April 1996. (Note: As recorded in the Acta Apostolicae Sedis, the 27 April 1996 appointment did not include Samoa, but Coveney is identified as Apostolic Nuncio to Samoa when given additional titles on 15 October 1996.) His remit was expanded to include Apostolic Nuncio to Fiji, Kiribati, the Federated States of Micronesia, and Vanuatu on 15 October 1996, and Apostolic Nuncio to Nauru on 7 December 1996. He was also named apostolic nuncio to the Cook Islands and Palau on 14 July 2001. As the longest-serving resident diplomatic representative to New Zealand, Archbishop Coveney served for a time as Dean of the Diplomatic Corps. While based in Wellington, he also represented the Holy See at the inauguration of Chen Shui-bian as president of the Republic of China (Taiwan) on 18 May 2004.

Coveney's last diplomatic appointment was as Apostolic Nuncio to Greece on 25 January 2005. On 5 November 2008, he officiated at the presentation to the Acropolis Museum in Athens of a fragment of the Parthenon Frieze on loan from the Vatican Museums.

Coveney retired in 2009, and died on 22 October 2022, at the age of 88.

== See also ==
- List of heads of the diplomatic missions of the Holy See
