= Cathedral of the Immaculate Conception =

Cathedral of the Immaculate Conception may refer to:

== Austria ==
- Cathedral of the Immaculate Conception, Linz

== Benin ==
- Basilique de l'Immaculée Conception, Ouidah

== Bolivia ==
- Immaculate Conception Cathedral, Concepción

== Burkina Faso ==
- Ouagadougou Cathedral, Ouagadougou

== Canada ==
- Cathedral of the Immaculate Conception (Saint John, New Brunswick)

== Chile ==
- Immaculate Conception Cathedral, Iquique

== China ==
- Cathedral of the Immaculate Conception, Beijing
- Cathedral of the Immaculate Conception (Changsha)
- Immaculate Conception Cathedral, Chengdu
- Cathedral of the Immaculate Conception (Hangzhou)
- Cathedral of the Immaculate Conception (Nanjing)
- Immaculate Conception Cathedral, Taiyuan
- Immaculate Conception Cathedral, Ürümqi

== Colombia ==
- Cathedral Basilica of the Immaculate Conception, Santa Fe de Antioquia
- Immaculate Conception Cathedral, Neiva

== Dominican Republic ==
- Immaculate Conception Cathedral, La Vega

== Ecuador ==
- Immaculate Conception Cathedral, Puerto Baquerizo Moreno

== East Timor ==
- Immaculate Conception Cathedral, Dili

== Greece ==
- Immaculate Conception Cathedral, Thessaloniki

== Grenada ==
- Immaculate Conception Cathedral, St. George's

== Guyana ==
- Immaculate Conception Cathedral, Georgetown

== Honduras ==
- Immaculate Conception Cathedral, Comayagua
- Immaculate Conception Cathedral, Juticalpa

== Hong Kong ==
- Cathedral of the Immaculate Conception (Hong Kong)

== India ==
- Immaculate Conception Cathedral, Pondicherry
- St. Mary's Immaculate Conception Cathedral, Ranchi

== Ireland ==
- Cathedral of the Immaculate Conception (Sligo)

== South Korea ==
- Immaculate Conception Cathedral, Jeju
- Myeongdong Cathedral, Seoul

== Madagascar ==
- Immaculate Conception Cathedral, Antananarivo

== Mexico ==
- Immaculate Conception Cathedral, Córdoba
- Cathedral Basilica of the Immaculate Conception, Durango
- Cathedral Basilica of the Immaculate Conception, Mazatlán
- Immaculate Conception Cathedral, Apatzingán
- Immaculate Conception Cathedral, Celaya
- Immaculate Conception Cathedral, Matehuala
- Immaculate Conception Cathedral, Tampico
- Immaculate Conception Cathedral, Tepic
- Immaculate Conception Cathedral, Zamora de Hidalgo

== Montenegro ==
- Immaculate Conception Cathedral, Bar

== Morocco ==
- Roman Catholic Cathedral of Tangier

== Panama ==
- Immaculate Conception Cathedral, Colón

== Peru ==
- Immaculate Conception Cathedral, Pucallpa

== Philippines ==
- Metropolitan Cathedral-Basilica Minore of the Immaculate Conception in Manila
- Immaculate Conception Cathedral-Basilica, Malolos, Bulacan
- Immaculate Conception Metropolitan Cathedral (Roxas)
- Metropolitan Cathedral of the Immaculate Conception (Zamboanga)
- Immaculate Conception Cathedral, Antipolo
- Immaculate Conception Cathedral, Basco
- Immaculate Conception Cathedral, Boac
- Immaculate Conception Cathedral, Cubao, Quezon City
- Immaculate Conception Cathedral, Pasig
- Immaculate Conception Cathedral, Puerto Princesa

== Russia ==
- Cathedral of the Immaculate Conception (Moscow)
- Immaculate Conception Church, Perm
- Immaculate Conception Church, Smolensk

== Saint Lucia ==
- Cathedral Basilica of the Immaculate Conception in Castries

== Samoa ==
- Immaculate Conception Cathedral, Apia

== Seychelles ==
- Immaculate Conception Cathedral, Seychelles

== South Africa ==
- Immaculate Conception Cathedral, Pella

== Taiwan ==
- Immaculate Conception Cathedral, Taipei

== Thailand ==
- Immaculate Conception Church, Bangkok
- Cathedral of the Immaculate Conception, Chanthaburi

== Tonga ==
- Cathedral of the Immaculate Conception, Tonga (Nuku'alofa)

== Trinidad and Tobago ==
- Cathedral Basilica of the Immaculate Conception (Port of Spain)

== Thailand ==
- Cathedral of the Immaculate Conception (Thailand)

== Ukraine ==
- Cathedral of the Immaculate Conception of the Blessed Virgin Mary, Ternopil

== United States ==
- Cathedral Basilica of the Immaculate Conception (Mobile, Alabama)
- Old Saint Mary's Cathedral, San Francisco, California
- Cathedral Basilica of the Immaculate Conception (Denver)
- Cathedral of the Immaculate Conception (Springfield, Illinois)
- Cathedral of the Immaculate Conception (Fort Wayne, Indiana)
- Cathedral of the Immaculate Conception (Wichita, Kansas)
- Cathedral of the Immaculate Conception (Lake Charles, Louisiana)
- Cathedral of the Immaculate Conception (Portland, Maine)
- Cathedral of the Immaculate Conception (Kansas City, Missouri)
- Cathedral of the Immaculate Conception (Crookston, Minnesota), former cathedral
- Cathedral of the Immaculate Conception (Camden, New Jersey)
- Cathedral of the Immaculate Conception (Albany, New York)
- Cathedral of the Immaculate Conception (Syracuse, New York)
- St. Mary's Cathedral of the Immaculate Conception (Portland, Oregon)
- Cathedral of the Immaculate Conception (Philadelphia), Pennsylvania
- Cathedral of the Immaculate Conception (Memphis, Tennessee)
- Immaculate Conception Cathedral (Brownsville, Texas)
- Cathedral of the Immaculate Conception (Tyler, Texas)
- Cathedral of the Immaculate Conception (Burlington, Vermont)

== Venezuela ==
- Cathedral Basilica of the Immaculate Conception (Mérida, Venezuela)
- Cathedral of the Immaculate Conception (San Carlos, Cojedes)

== Zimbabwe ==
- Cathedral Basilica of the Immaculate Conception (Bulawayo)

== See also ==
- Basilica Cathedral (disambiguation)
- Basilica of the Immaculate Conception (disambiguation)
- Cathedral Basilica (disambiguation)
- Cathedral of Saint Mary of the Immaculate Conception (disambiguation)
- Church of the Immaculate Conception (disambiguation)
- Cathedral of Our Lady Immaculate, Monaco
