= Diocese of Apatzingan =

Latin Catholic jurisdiction in Mexico

Coordinates: 19.0862°N 102.3540°W

Diocese of Apatzingan Dioecesis Apatzinganiensis Diócesis de Apatzingán

Location
- Country: Mexico
- Ecclesiastical province: Morelia

Statistics
- Area: 5,060 sq mi (13,100 km^{2})
- Population: Total; Catholics: (as of 2006); 718,000; 646,000 (90%)
- Parishes: 26

Information
- Denomination: Catholic Church
- Sui iuris church: Latin Church
- Rite: Roman Rite
- Established: 30 April 1962 (63 years ago)
- Cathedral: Cathedral of the Immaculate Conception

Current leadership
- Pope: Leo XIV
- Bishop: Cristóbal Ascencio García
- Metropolitan Archbishop: Carlos Garfias Merlos

Map
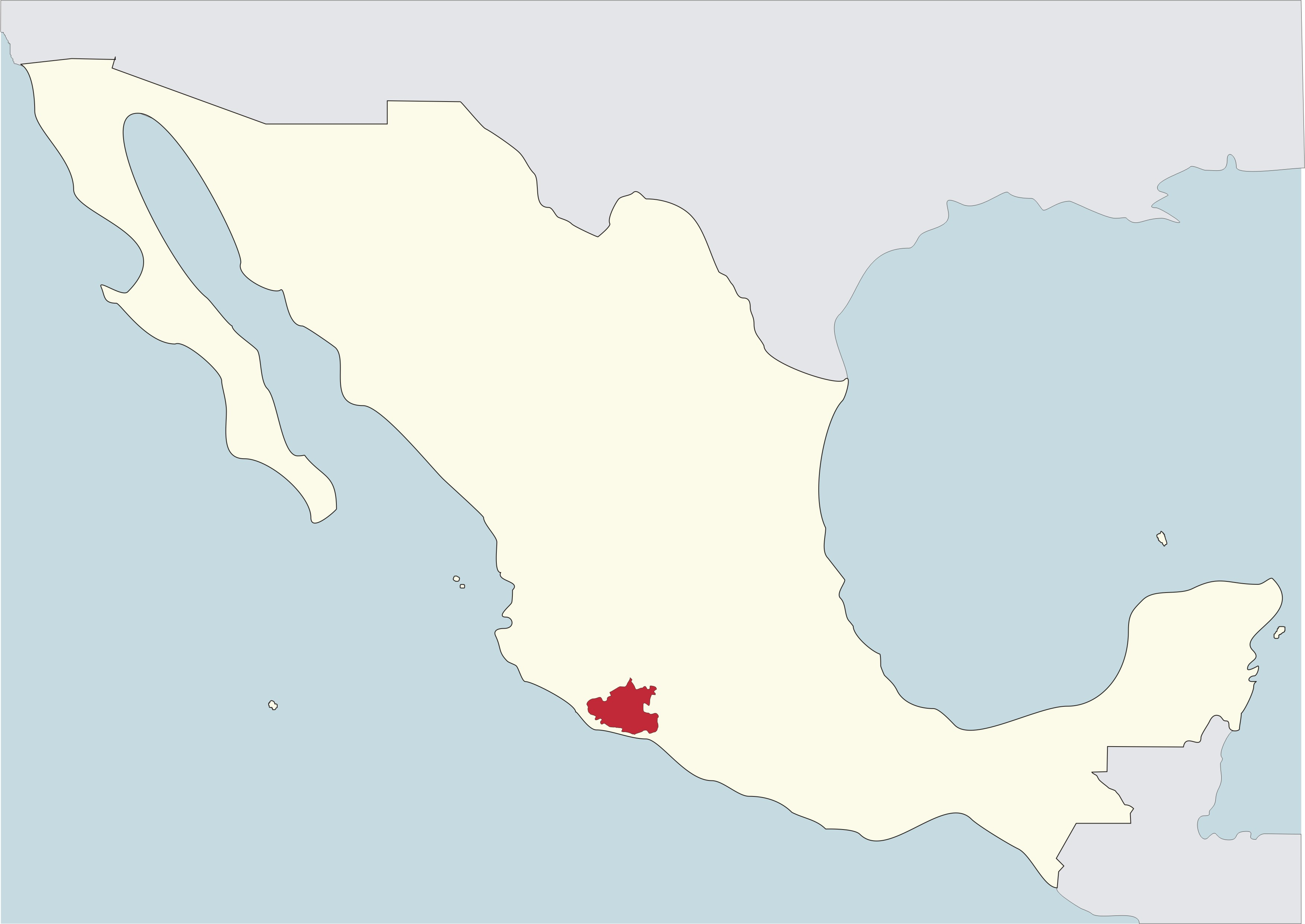

Website
- www.diocesisdeapatzingan.org.mx

The Diocese of Apatzingan (Latin: Dioecesis Apatzinganiensis) is a Latin Church ecclesiastical territory or diocese of the Catholic Church in Mexico. It is a suffragan in the ecclesiastical province of the metropolitan Archdiocese of Morelia. Its cathedra is found within the Immaculate Conception Cathedral, in the episcopal see of Apatzingan, Michoacán.

== History ==
The Diocese of Apatzingan was erected on 30 April 1962. Along with the Diocese of Ciudad Altamirano, it lost territory in 1985 to form the Diocese of Ciudad Lázaro Cárdenas.

== Ordinaries ==
- Victorino Alvarez Tena (1962 -1974), appointed Bishop of Celaya, Guanajuato
- José Fernández Arteaga (1974 -1980), appointed Bishop of Colima
- Miguel Patiño Velázquez, M.S.F. (1981 -2014)
- Cristóbal Ascencio García (2014 - )

== External links and references ==
- "Diocese of Apatzingan". Catholic-Hierarchy.
