= Cathedral Basilica =

Cathedral Basilica may refer to:

== Canada ==
- Mary, Queen of the World Cathedral, also known as the Cathedral-Basilica of Mary, Queen of the World, Quebec, Canada
- Notre-Dame Cathedral Basilica, Ottawa, Ontario, Canada
- Saint-Michel Basilica-Cathedral, also known as the Cathedral-Basilica of St. Michael, Quebec, Canada
- St. Joseph's Basilica (Edmonton), also known as the St. Joseph's Cathedral Basilica, Canada
- St. Mary's Basilica (Halifax, Nova Scotia), also known as the St. Mary's Cathedral Basilica, Canada
- St. Boniface Cathedral, also known as the Cathedral Basilica of St. Boniface, Manitoba, Canada

== India ==
- St. Thomas Cathedral Basilica, Chennai, also known as the San Thome Cathedral Basilica, India
- Santa Cruz Cathedral Basilica, Kochi, also known as the Santa Cruz Cathedral Basilica, India
- St. Mary's Syro-Malabar Cathedral Basilica, Ernakulam, India

== Italy ==
- Frascati Cathedral, also known as the Cathedral Basilica of St. Peter Apostle, Italy
- St Mark's Basilica, also known as the Patriarchal Cathedral Basilica of Saint Mark, Italy

== Lithuania ==
- Kaunas Archcathedral Basilica, Kaunas, Lithuania
- Vilnius Cathedral, the main Roman Catholic Cathedral of Lithuania

== Poland ==
- Archcathedral Basilica of St. Peter and St. Paul, Poznań, also known as the Cathedral Basilica of St. Peter and St. Paul, Poznań, Poland
- Cathedral Basilica of St. James the Apostle, Szczecin, Poland
- Cathedral Basilica of St. John the Baptist and St. John the Evangelist, Torun, Poland
- Gniezno Cathedral, also known as the Cathedral Basilica of the Assumption of the Blessed Virgin Mary, Gniezno, Poland
- Oliwa Cathedral, also known as the Cathedral Basilica of the Holy Trinity, Gdansk, Poland
- Pelplin Abbey, also known as the Cathedral Basilica of the Assumption of the Blessed Virgin Mary, Pelplin, Poland
- Sandomierz Cathedral, also known as the Cathedral Basilica of the Nativity of the Blessed Virgin Mary, Sandomierz, Poland
- St. John's Cathedral, Warsaw, also known as the Cathedral Basilica of St. John the Baptist, Warsaw, Poland
- St. Mary's Church, Gdansk, also known as the Cathedral Basilica of the Assumption of the Blessed Virgin Mary, Gdansk, Poland
- Wawel Cathedral, also known as the Cathedral Basilica of St. Stanislaus and St. Wenceslaus, Krakow, Poland

== Spain ==
- Cathedral of Menorca, also known as the Cathedral Basilica of Menorca, Spain
- Cathedral of San Salvador, Oviedo, also known as the Metropolitan Cathedral Basilica of the Holy Saviour, Spain

== U.S. ==
- Cathedral Basilica of the Immaculate Conception, Mobile, Alabama
- Cathedral Basilica of St. Joseph (San Jose), California
- Cathedral Basilica of the Immaculate Conception, Denver, Colorado
- Cathedral Basilica of St. Augustine, Florida
- Cathedral Basilica of the Assumption, Covington, Kentucky
- Cathedral Basilica of St. Louis, Missouri
- Cathedral Basilica of St. Francis of Assisi (Santa Fe), New Mexico
- Cathedral Basilica of the Sacred Heart, Newark, New Jersey
- Cathedral Basilica of St. James (Brooklyn), New York City
- Cathedral Basilica of Saints Peter and Paul, Philadelphia, Pennsylvania
- St. Anthony Cathedral, Beaumont, Texas, also known as the Saint Anthony Cathedral Basilica
- St. Mary's Cathedral Basilica, Galveston, Texas

== Other countries ==
- Cathedral Basilica of Our Lady of the Rosary, Rosario, Argentina
- St Patrick's Cathedral, Melbourne, also known as the St. Patrick's Cathedral Basilica, Australia
- Cathedral of Salvador, also known as the Cathedral Basilica of Salvador, Brazil
- Lille Cathedral, also known as the Cathedral Basilica of Notre Dame de la Treille, France
- Speyer Cathedral, also known as the Imperial Cathedral Basilica of the Assumption and St. Stephen, Germany
- Cathedral Basilica of Our Lady of Seven Sorrows, Ghana
- St Peter's Cathedral Basilica, Kumasi, Ghana
- Dulce Nombre de Maria Cathedral Basilica, Guam
- Cathedral Basilica of the Holy Family, Nairobi, Kenya
- Cathedral Basilica of the Most Holy Trinity, Onitsha, Nigeria
- Cathedral Basilica of Our Lady, Rwanda
- Cathedral Basilica of the Immaculate Conception in Castries, Saint Lucia

== See also ==
- Cathedral Basilica of St. Joseph (disambiguation), several
- Cathedral of the Immaculate Conception (disambiguation), several, also known as the Cathedral Basilica of the Immaculate Conception
- Basilica Cathedral (disambiguation)
