= Religion in Samoa =

Apia Cathedral

Christianity is the official and largest religion in Samoa, with its various denominations accounting for around 98% of the total population. The article 1 of the Constitution of Samoa states that "Samoa is a Christian nation founded of God the Father, the Son and the Holy Spirit".

The following is a distribution of Christian groups as of 2021 (the most recent census available): Congregational Christian (27 percent), Roman Catholic (18 percent), The Church of Jesus Christ of Latter-day Saints (17.6 percent), Methodist (11.8 percent), Assemblies of God (10.1 percent) and Seventh-day Adventist (4.9 percent). Groups together constituting less than 5 percent of the population include Baháʼí, Jehovah's Witnesses, Congregational Church of Jesus, Nazarene, nondenominational Protestant, Baptist, Worship Centre, Peace Chapel, Samoa Evangelism, Elim Church, and Anglican. A comparison of the 2006 and 2011 censuses shows a slight decline in the membership of major denominations and an increase in participation in nontraditional and evangelical groups.

Although there is no official estimate, there are reportedly small numbers of Hindus, Buddhists, Jews and traditional believers, primarily in Apia. The country has one of the world's eight Baháʼí Houses of Worship.

The number of Samoans who reported as non religious at the 2021 census was only 132, or 0.06% of the population.

== Demographics ==
Affiliation	2001 census	2006 census	2011 census	2016 census	2021
Congregational Christian Church of Samoa	35.0%	33.8%	31.8%	29.0%	27.0%
Roman Catholic	19.7%	19.6%	19.4%	18.8%	18.0%
The Church of Jesus Christ of Latter-day Saints	12.5%	13.3%	15.1%	16.9%	17.6%
Methodist	15.0%	14.3%	13.7%	12.4%	11.8%
Assemblies of God	6.6%	6.9%	8.0%	6.8%	10.1%
Seventh-day Adventist	3.5%	3.5%	3.9%	4.4%	4.9%
Others	7.7%	8.6%	8.1%	11.7%	10.6%

== History ==
Before the introduction of Christianity, the various islands of the Samoan Archipelago followed a polytheistic religion. Christianity would be introduced to the Islands in the early 19th century, first by Methodist preacher Peter Turner in 1828, followed by John Williams and Charles Barff of the London Missionary Society two years later, in 1830.

== Status of government respect for religious freedom ==
The constitution and other laws and policies protect religious freedom. The constitution provides for the right to choose, practice, and change the religion of one's choice.

The government does not require religious groups to register.

Public-school syllabuses do not include religious education, but prayers may be used during the school day.

In 2012, the government observed the following religious holidays as national holidays: Good Friday, Easter Monday, White Monday (Children's Day), Feast of the Ascension and Christmas.

In June 2017, the Samoan Parliament passed a bill to increase support for Christianity in the country's constitution, including a reference to the Trinity. According to The Diplomat, "What Samoa has done is shift references to Christianity into the body of the constitution, giving the text far more potential to be used in legal processes." The preamble to the constitution already described the country as "an independent State based on Christian principles and Samoan custom and traditions."

== Status of societal respect for religious freedom ==
Traditionally, villages tended to have one primary Christian church. Village chiefs often chose the religious denomination of their extended families. Many larger villages had multiple churches serving different denominations and coexisting peacefully.

There can be strong societal pressure at village and local levels to participate in church services and other activities, and to support church leaders and projects financially. In some denominations, financial contributions often totaled more than 30% of family income.

In the past there have been minor tensions between Fa'a Samoa (the Samoan way) and individual religious rights. One of the elements of Fa'a Samoa was the traditional, tightly-knit village community. Often, village elders and the community at large were not receptive toward those who attempted to introduce another denomination or religion into the community. Observers stated that, in many villages throughout the country, leaders forbade individuals to belong to churches outside of the village or to exercise their right not to worship. Villagers in violation of such rules faced fines or banishment from the village.

== Minority religions ==
Due to smaller numbers, the Muslim and Hindu population count was merged in the 2011 Census, with the total now being 38 adherents. The 2011 Census stated that of the 38 Muslims/Hindus, 25 were male and 13 female. This gender imbalance, which has inflated the proportion of male to females, may have been a consequence of the 2009 Samoa earthquake and tsunami, when more than 150 people died and many emigrated.

=== Islam ===
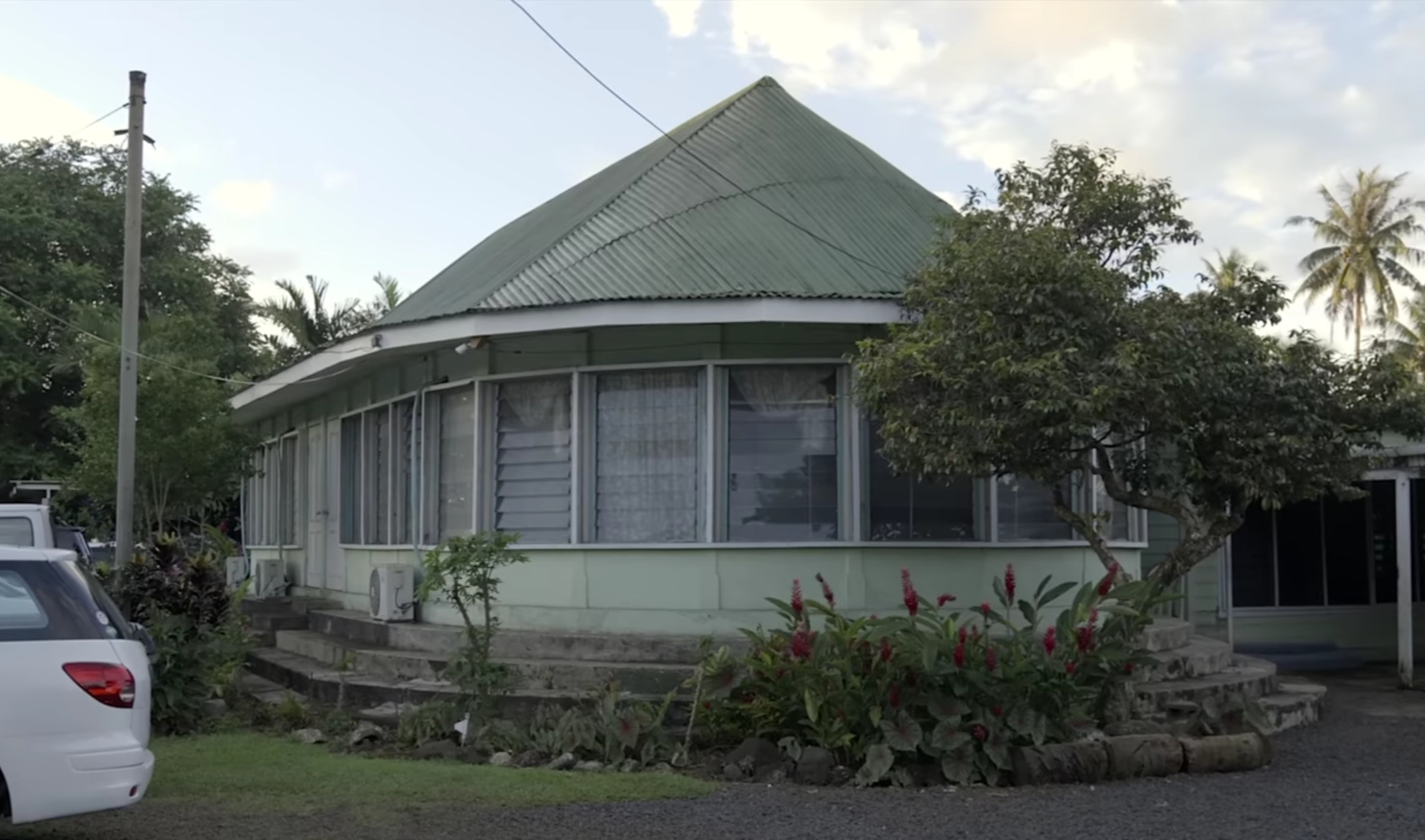
Mariam Masjid in Samoa

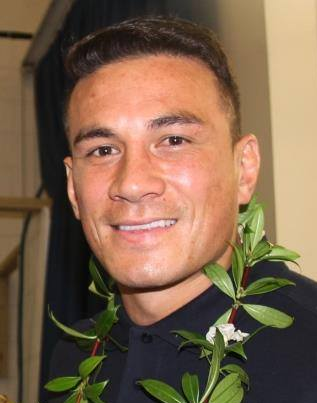
Sonny Bill Williams. 2014

There is a small Muslim community and one mosque. During the 2001 census, Muslims accounted for 0.03% of the population. According to the 2006 census, the number of Samoan Muslims was 61, or 0.04% of the population.

The introduction of Islam into the country began centuries ago. But in recent years significant attention was brought in the 1980s when the Saudi Arabia-based World Assembly of Muslim Youth and Malaysia-based Regional Islamic Da'wah Council of Southeast Asia and the Pacific began their dawah activities in Pacific countries. The Western Samoa Muslim League is the Islamic organisation in the country which was established in 1986.

There is one prominent mosque(masjid mariam) in the country, located in the village of Vaiusu, although small prayer rooms can be found across the island.

Sonny Bill Williams, a New Zealand rugby union player, converted to Islam in 2009 while playing for Toulon in France. He was the first Muslim to play for the All Blacks. He performed the Hajj pilgrimage in 2018. He is also a Samoan citizen.

=== Hinduism ===
There is a small population of Hindus constituted mainly by migrants from Fiji. The number of Hindus, like the number of Muslims, fluctuates repeatedly. As of the 2006 Samoan Census, there were 25 Hindus. More than 55% of Hindus are concentrated in Faleata West. According to other estimates in 2016 the religion claimed more than a thousand followers across Samoa.

== Freedom of religion in the 2020s ==
In 2023, the country was scored 3 out of 4 for religious freedom; it was noted that provisions in three government-backed bills (the Constitution Amendment Bill 2020, the Lands and Titles Court Bill 2020, and the Judicature Amendment Bill 2020) could limit religious freedom by changing how legal decisions on Land and Titles are reviewed.

== Gallery ==
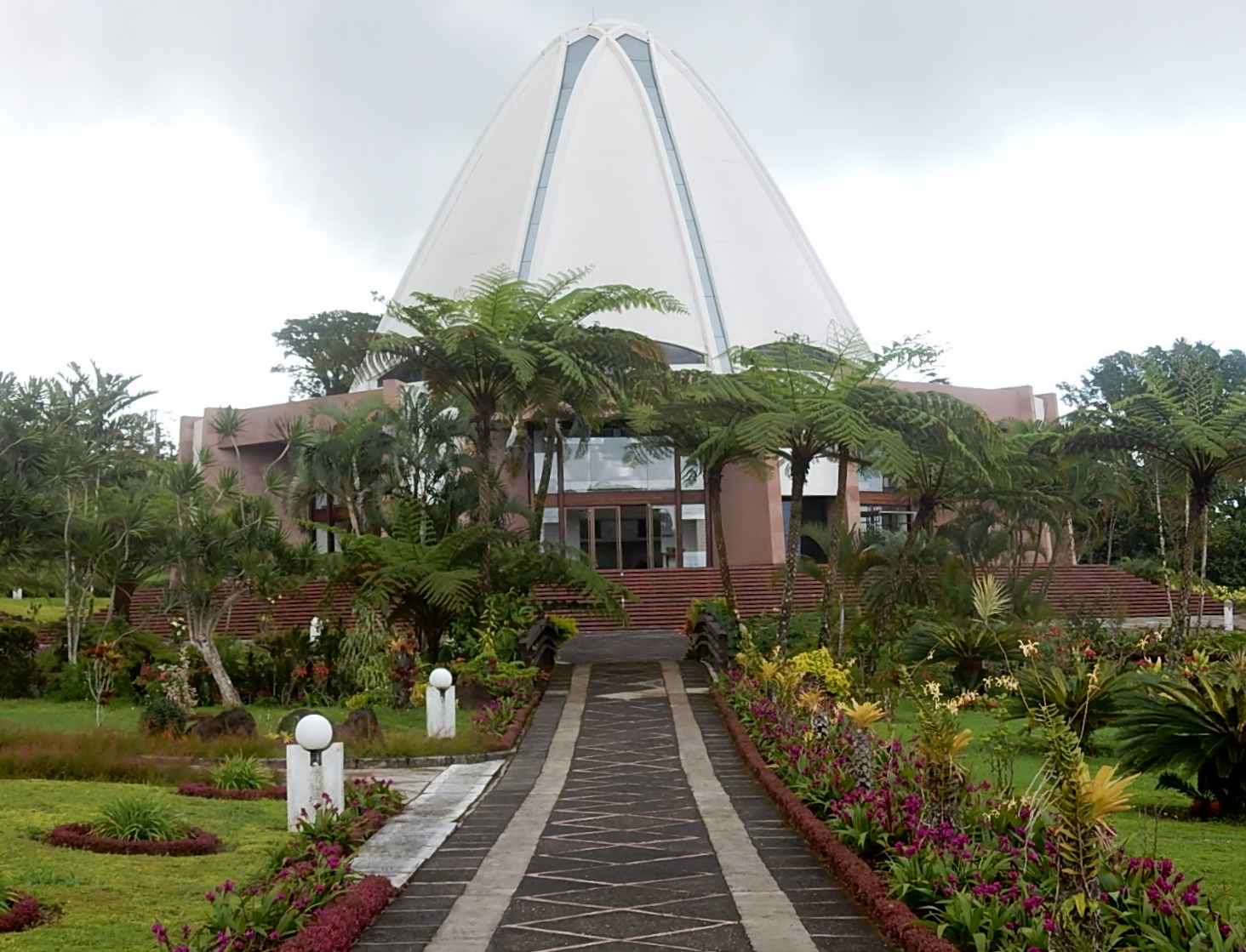
The Bahá’í House of Worship near Apia, Samoa

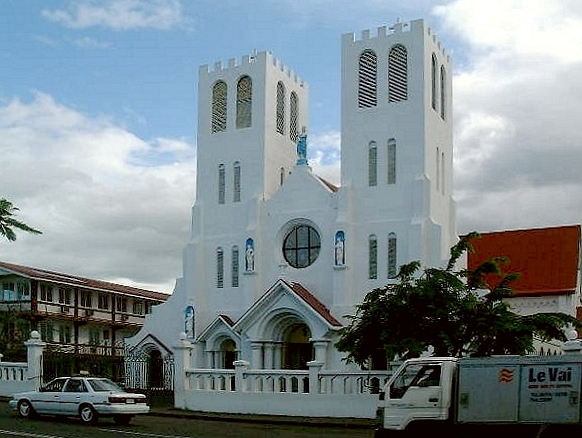
Mulivai Cathedral, Apia (Catholic), Samoa. The earthquake-damaged Cathedral has now been demolished.

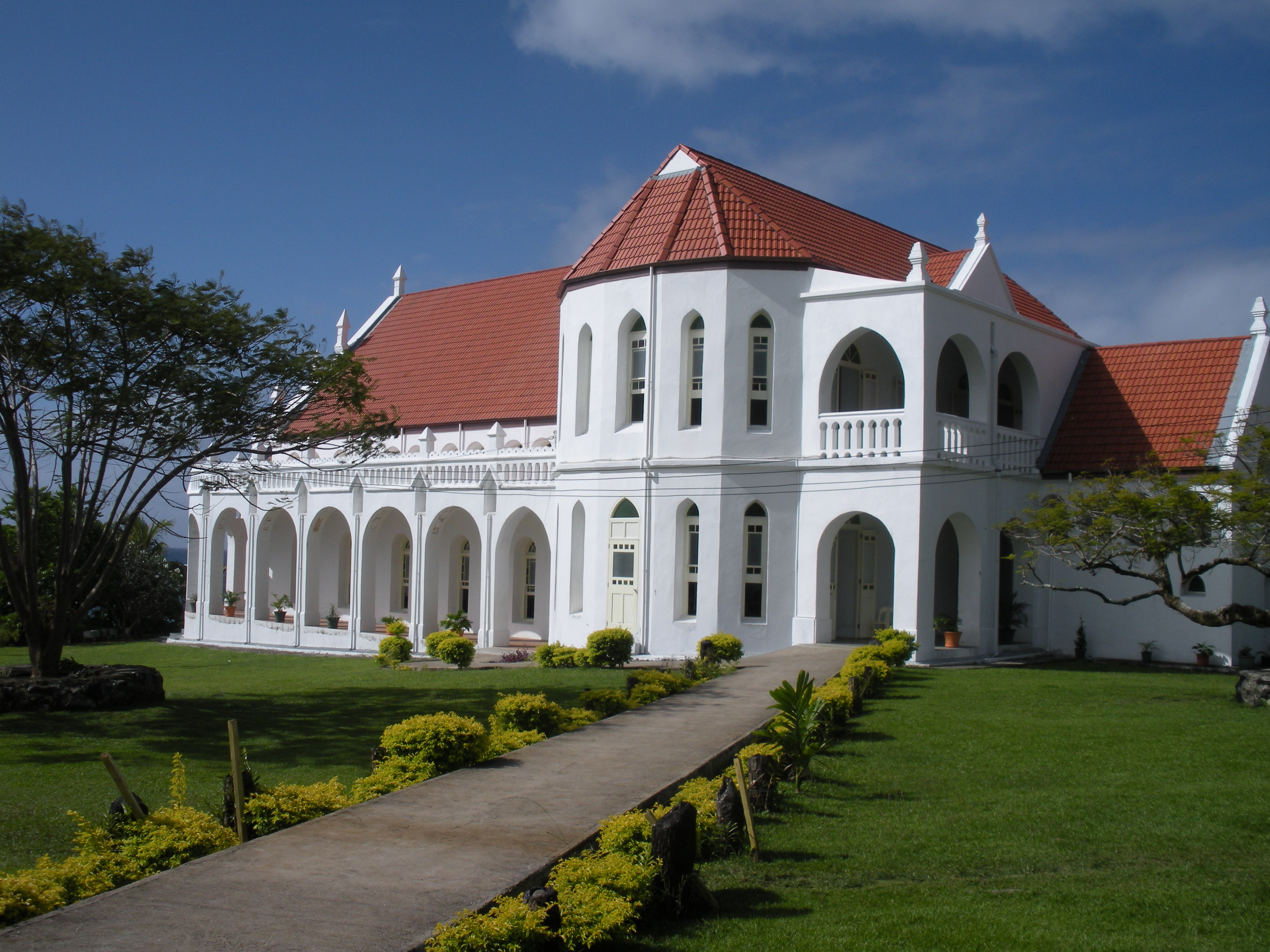
Historic Methodist Chapel at Piula Theological College on Upolu island

== See also ==
- Baháʼí Faith in Samoa
- Roman Catholicism in Samoa
- Piula Theological College
- Samoan Assemblies of God
- Samoan mythology
- The Church of Jesus Christ of Latter-day Saints in Samoa
