= Miguel Patiño Velázquez =

Mexican Roman Catholic bishop (1938–2019)

Miguel Patiño Velázquez M.S.F.
- Bishop of Apatzingan
- Church: Catholic Church
- Diocese: Diocese of Apatzingan
- In office: 9 April 1981 – 17 November 2014
- Predecessor: José Fernández Arteaga
- Successor: Cristóbal Ascencio García

Orders
- Ordination: 16 June 1963
- Consecration: 21 May 1981 by Girolamo Prigione

Personal details
- Born: 30 September 1938 La Piedad de Cabadas, Michoacán, Mexico
- Died: 21 September 2019 (aged 80)

Miguel Patiño Velázquez (30 September 1938 – 22 September 2019) was a Mexican Roman Catholic bishop.

== Life ==
Patiño Velázquez was born in Mexico and was ordained to the priesthood in 1963. He served as bishop of the Roman Catholic Diocese of Apatzingán, Mexico, from 1981 to 2014.
