= Immaculate Conception Cathedral, Neiva =

Immaculate Conception Cathedral
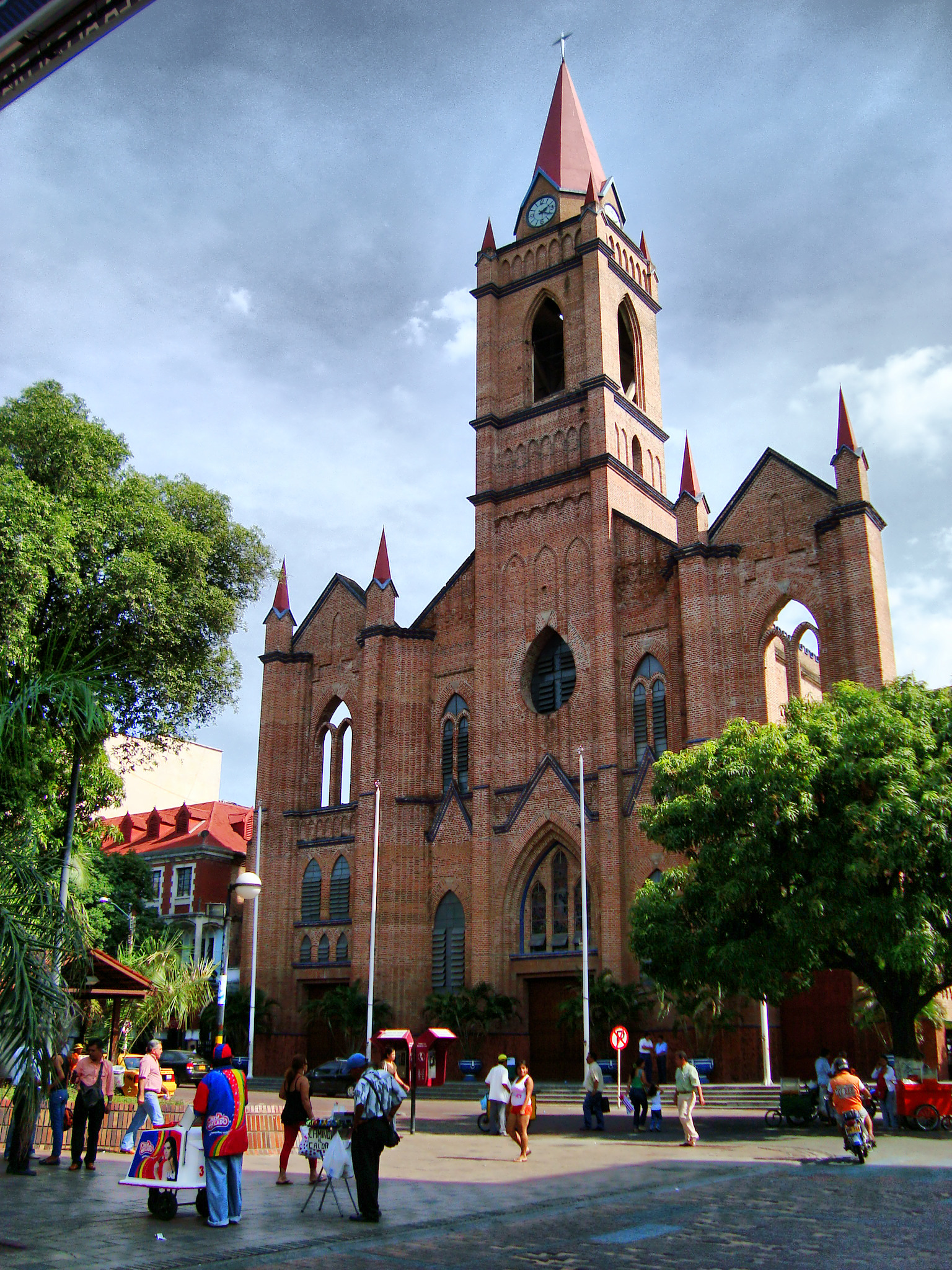

- Location within Colombia
- Immaculate Conception Cathedral
- 2°55′33″N 75°17′21″W
- Location: Neiva
- Country: Colombia
- Denomination: Roman Catholic Church

The Immaculate Conception Cathedral Also Neiva Cathedral Is the name given to a religious building affiliated with the Roman Catholic Church dedicated to the Virgin Mary in her invocation of the Immaculate Conception. It is located in the city of Neiva in the department of Huila in the southwestern part of the South American country of Colombia.

The temple that follows the Roman or Latin rite is the mother church of the Diocese of Neiva (Dioecesis Neivensis) that was established in 1972 by Pope Paul VI. It was built in a Gothic style that for a long time dominated the constructions of the city. The church is located on the south side of Santander Park, in the heart of Neiva.

== See also ==
- Roman Catholicism in Colombia
- Immaculate Conception Cathedral
