= Folks River, Panama =

Folks River is a city and river along the Caribbean seacoast in Colón Province, Panama, near the Atlantic entrance to the Panama Canal. It is located at 9°21′0″N 79°54′0″W

By the time the United States acquired the rights to build the Canal in 1904, the settlement at Folks River — then called Fox River — consisted of “small, portable houses put up by the French and in bad condition,” and “24 main buildings in three rows,” between the railroad shops and the main line. In 1915, the town's population (then 932) changed its name to Folks River.

== Nearby locales ==
| Place | Distance |
|---|---|
| Colón | 2 km (1.2 mi) |
| Coco Solo | 3 km (1.9 mi) |
| Brazos Brook | 4 km (2.5 mi) |
| Brazos Heights | 5 km (3.1 mi) |
| Cocos Islands | 5 km (3.1 mi) |
| Camino Chagres | 6 km (3.7 mi) |
| Carretera Bolívar | 6 km (3.7 mi) |
| Howard Battery | 6 km (3.7 mi) |
| Loma Borracho | 7 km (4.3 mi) |
