= Cathedral of Córdoba, Veracruz =

Coordinates: 21.2454°N 102.3340°W

Immaculate Conception Cathedral
- Catedral de la Inmaculada Concepción
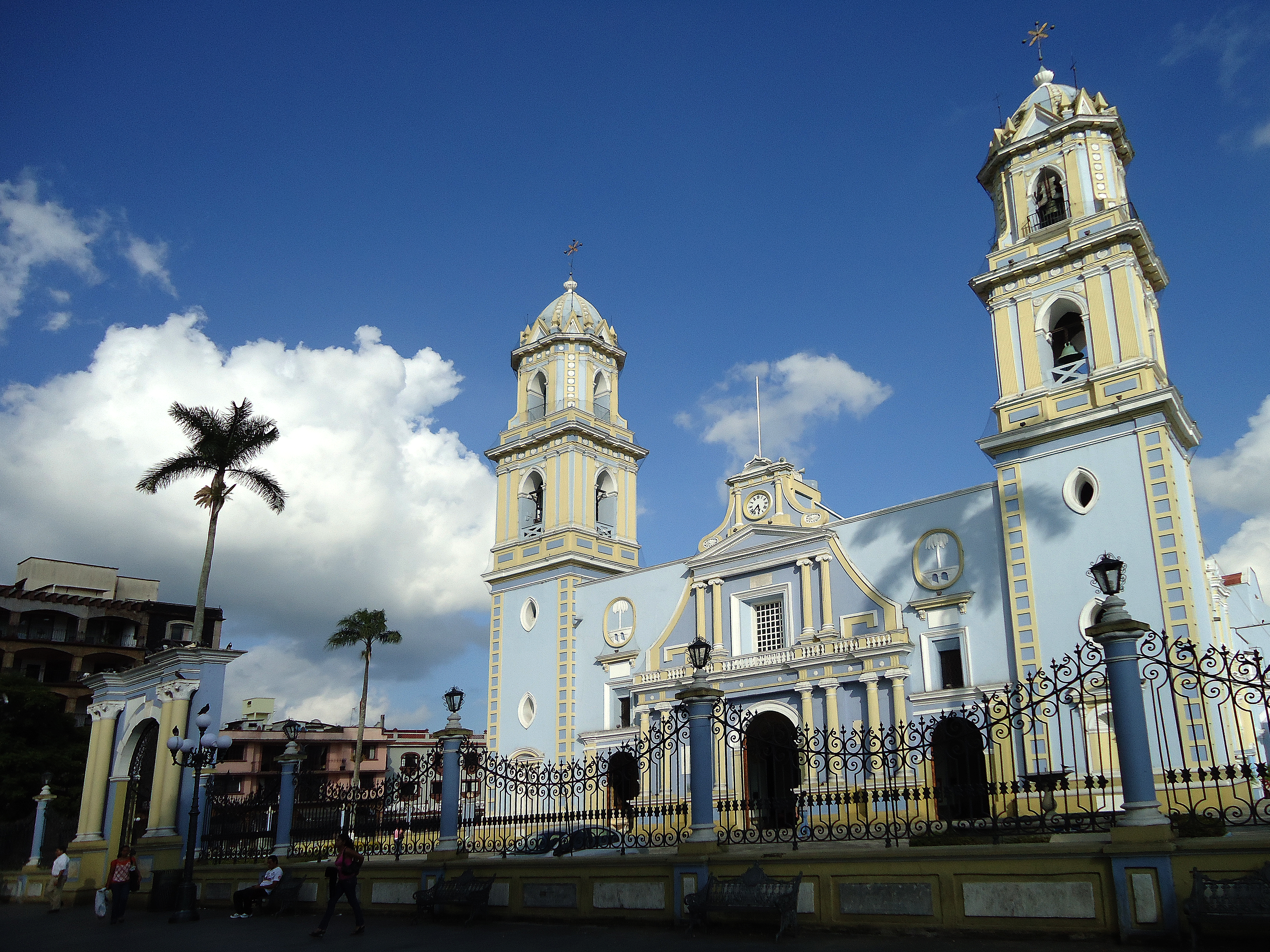
- Immaculate Conception Cathedral
- Location: Córdoba, Veracruz
- Country: Mexico
- Denomination: Roman Catholic Church

The Immaculate Conception Cathedral (Spanish: Catedral de la Inmaculada Concepción) also called Córdoba Cathedral is the main Catholic church in the city of Córdoba in the Mexican state of Veracruz. It was built in the first half of the seventeenth century. It is also headquarters of the Diocese of Córdoba and is dedicated to the Virgin of the Immaculate Conception, also the temple was known as the Immaculate Conception, it is located opposite the Plaza de Armas in the historic center of the city and its bells are made from copper and iron which were brought from Mexico City.

== See also ==
- Roman Catholicism in Mexico
- Immaculate Conception Cathedral
