= George E. Pierce =

George Ellis Pierce
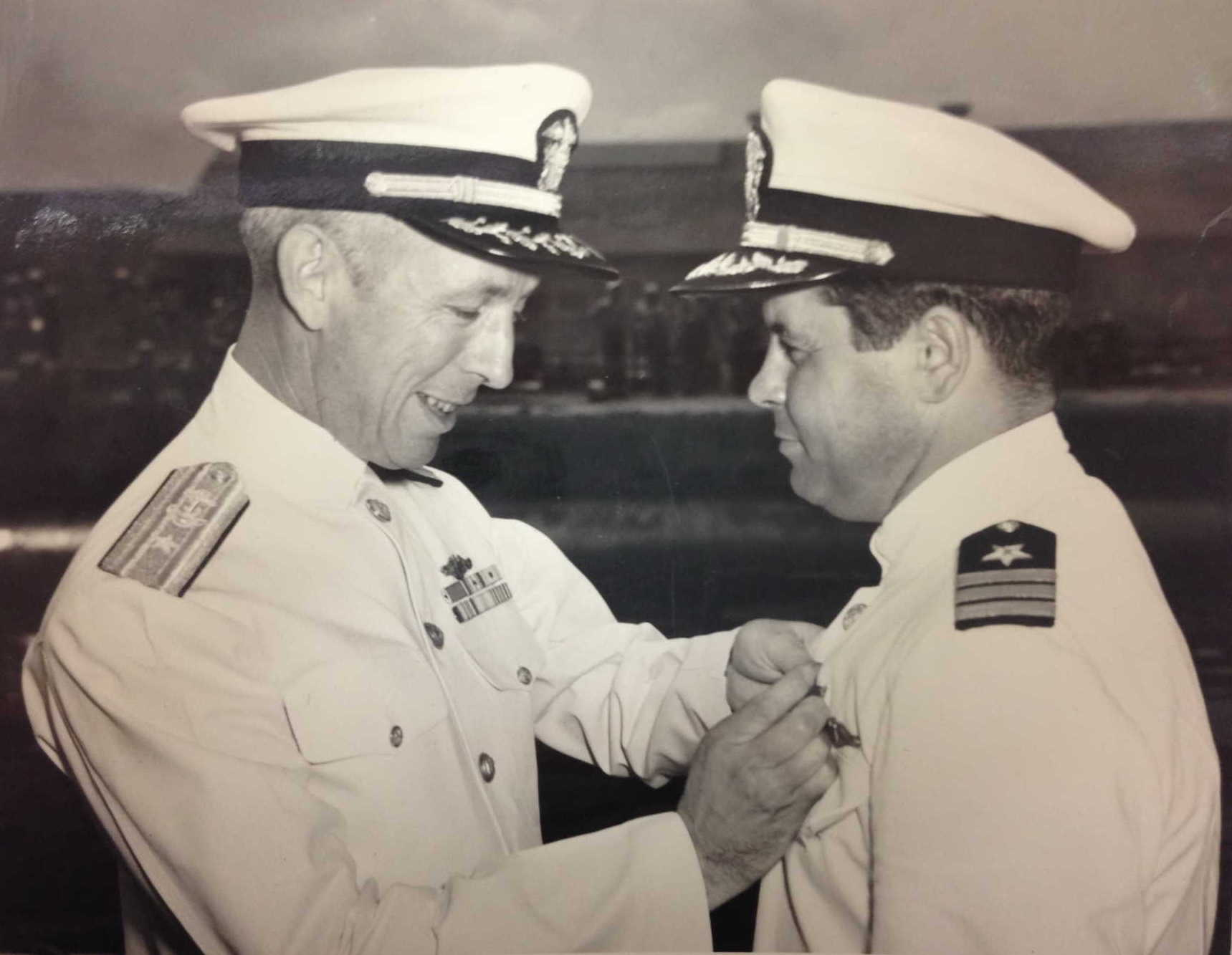
- CDR George E. Pierce being awarded the Navy Cross by RDML Lockwood.
- Born: October 13, 1909; Colón, Panama
- Died: June 29, 1981 (aged 71)
- Burial place: Arlington National Cemetery
- Education: United States Naval Academy
- Spouse: Mary Mercedes Miller
- Relatives: John Reeves Pierce (Brother)
- Military career
- Allegiance: United States of America
- Branch: United States Navy
- Service years: 1932–1959
- Rank: Rear Admiral
- Service number: 0-71646
- Commands: USS Tunny (SS-282); Mine Division 2 USS Suribachi (AE-21)
- Conflicts: World War II; Korean War
- Awards: Navy Cross (2); Legion of Merit (2)

George Ellis Pierce (13 Oct 1909 – 29 Jun 1981), was a decorated submarine commander during World War II who reached the rank of rear admiral in the United States Navy.

Pierce was born in 1909 to Dr. Claude Connor Pierce Sr. and Shirley Pierce (née Reeves) in Colón, Panama, while Dr. Pierce was serving there with the United States Public Health Service. His older brother John Reeves Pierce graduated from the United States Naval Academy in 1928, and George followed him in 1932. Pierce began his career in the Navy with submarines, but later transferred to dirigibles. During World War II, John "Jack" Pierce was killed in action when the submarine he commanded, the USS Argonaut (SM-1), was sunk by the Japanese. Upon hearing of his brother's death, Pierce immediately volunteered for submarine duty. On 10 July 1944 Pierce took command of the USS Tunny (SS-282), a Gato-class submarine. Pierce commanded the USS Tunny on her 7th, 8th, and 9th war patrol, being awarded the Navy Cross for the 8th and 9th war patrols.
