= Colón, Panama =

Colón
- City
- Ciudad de Colón
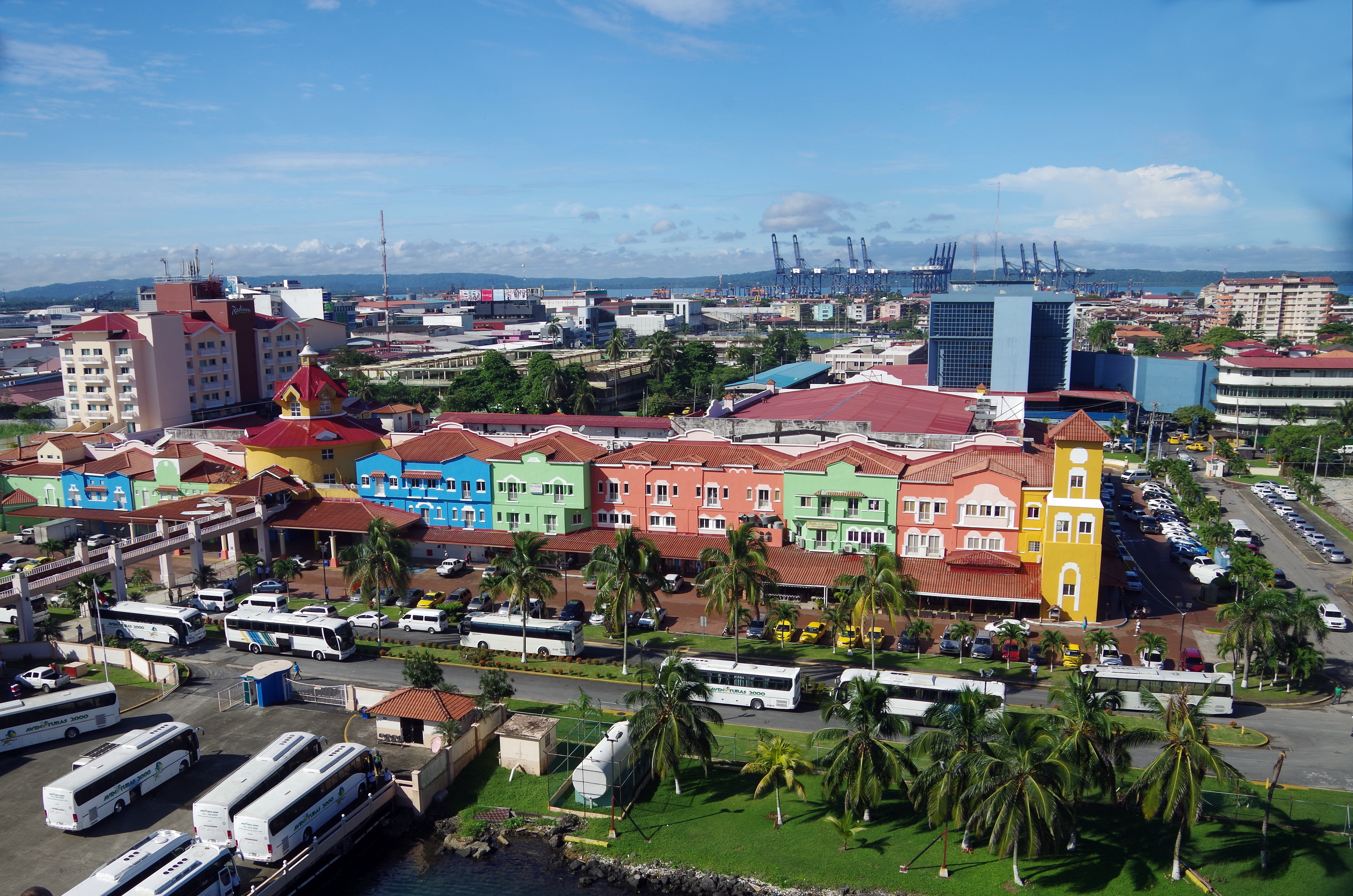
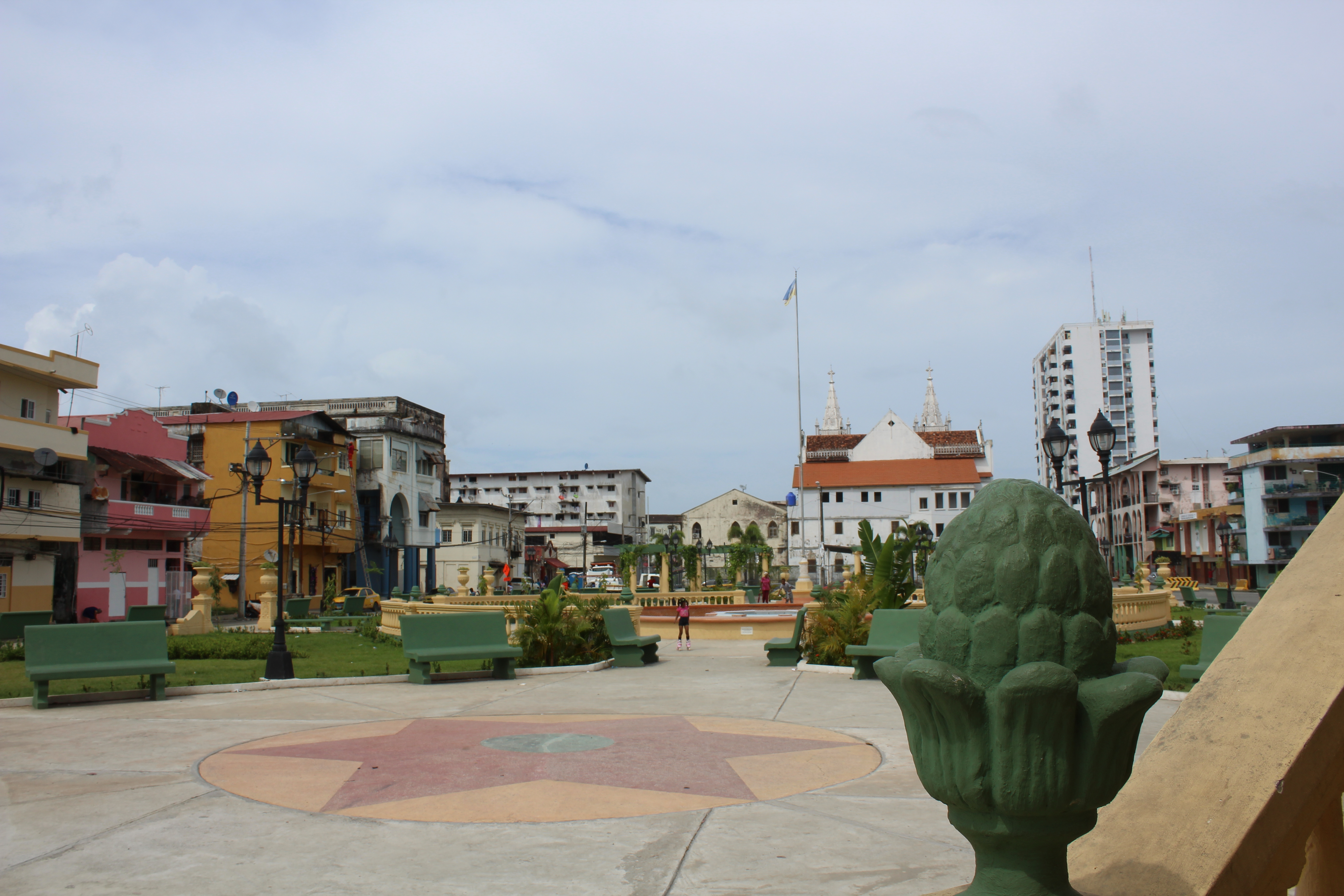
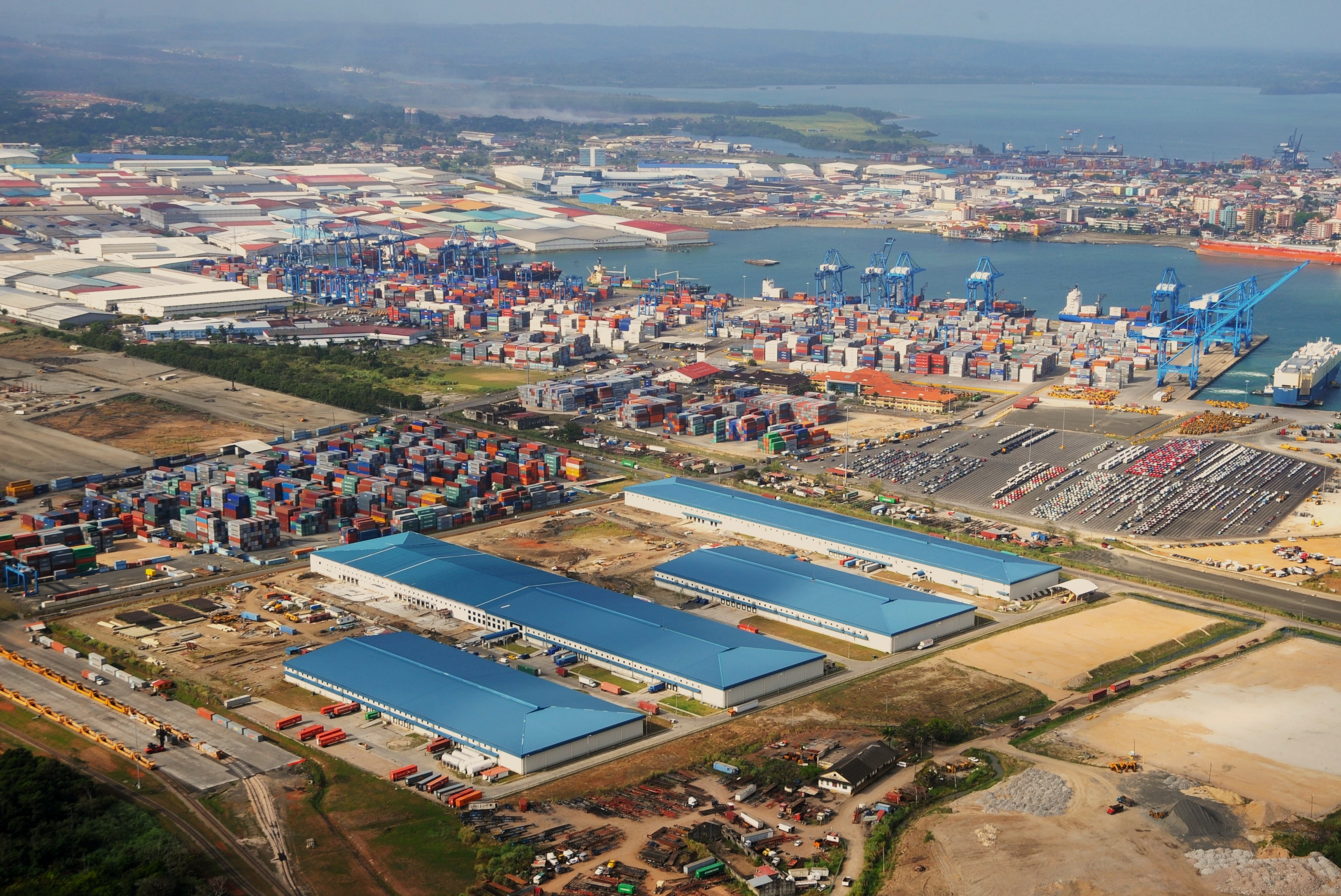
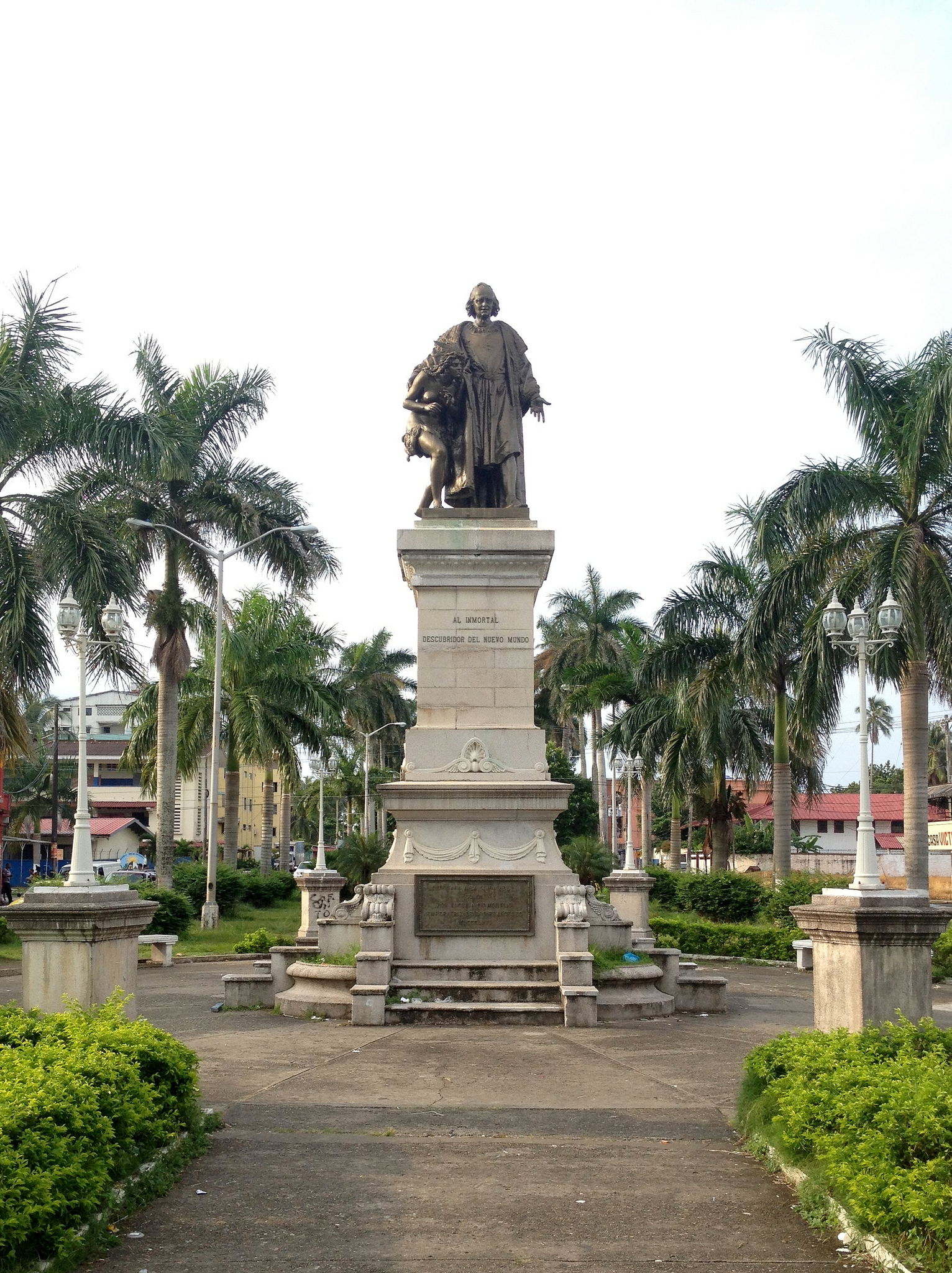
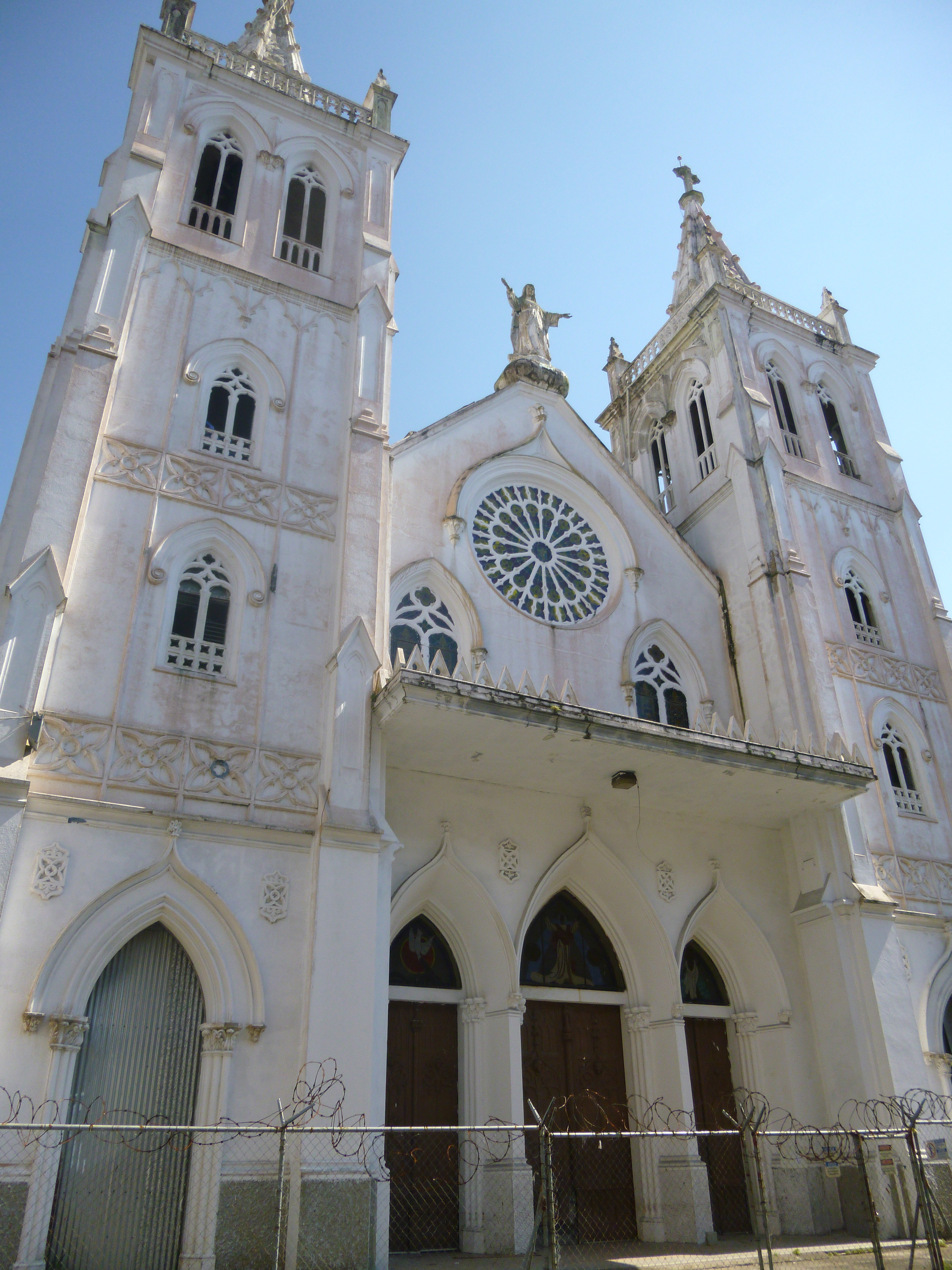
- Top to bottom, left to right: Aerial view of Colón, November 5 Park located at the Historic District of Colón, Colón Free Trade Zone, Statue of Christopher Columbus, and the Inmaculate Conception Cathedral.

- Flag Coat of arms

- Location within Panama
- Coordinates: 9°21′26″N 79°53′55″W
- Country: Panama
- Province: Colón Province
- District: Colón District
- Named for: Christopher Columbus

Government
  - President: Jose Raul Mulino
  - Mayor: Federico Policani

Area
  - City: 2.4 km^{2} (0.93 sq mi)
- Elevation: 9 m (30 ft)

Population (2016)
  - City: 78,000
  - Density: 33,000/km^{2} (84,000/sq mi)
  - Metro: 241,817
- Time zone: UTC−5 (Eastern)
- Area code: +507
- Climate: Am
- Website: MunicipioColón.gob.pa; Renovation Colón

Colón (Spanish pronunciation: [koˈlon]) is a city and seaport in Panama, beside the Caribbean Sea, lying near the Atlantic entrance to the Panama Canal. It is the capital of Panama's Colón Province and has traditionally been known as Panama's second city. City proper located entirely on Manzanillo Peninsula (former island), surrounded by Limon Bay, Manzanillo Bay, and the Folks River. Since the disestablishment of the Panama Canal Zone, suburban corregimiento of Cristobal to include Fort Gulick, a former U.S. Army base, as well as the towns of Cristobal and Margarita; and recent corregimiento of Cristóbal Este now include the town of Coco Solo.

== History ==
The city was founded in 1850 as the Atlantic terminal of the Panama Railroad, then underwent construction to meet the demand during the California Gold Rush for a fast route to California. For a number of years early in its history, the sizable United States émigré community called the town Aspinwall after Panama Railroad promoter William Henry Aspinwall, while the city's Hispanic community called it Colón in honor of Christopher Columbus. The city was founded on the western end of a treacherously marshy islet known as Manzanillo Island. As part of the construction of the Panama Railroad, the island was connected to the Panamanian mainland by a causeway and part of the island was drained to allow the erection of permanent buildings.

Much of the city was destroyed in the Burning of Colón during the Colombian Civil War of 1885 and again during a massive fire in 1915. The Great Colón Fire of April 13–14, 1940 destroyed one-third of the city.

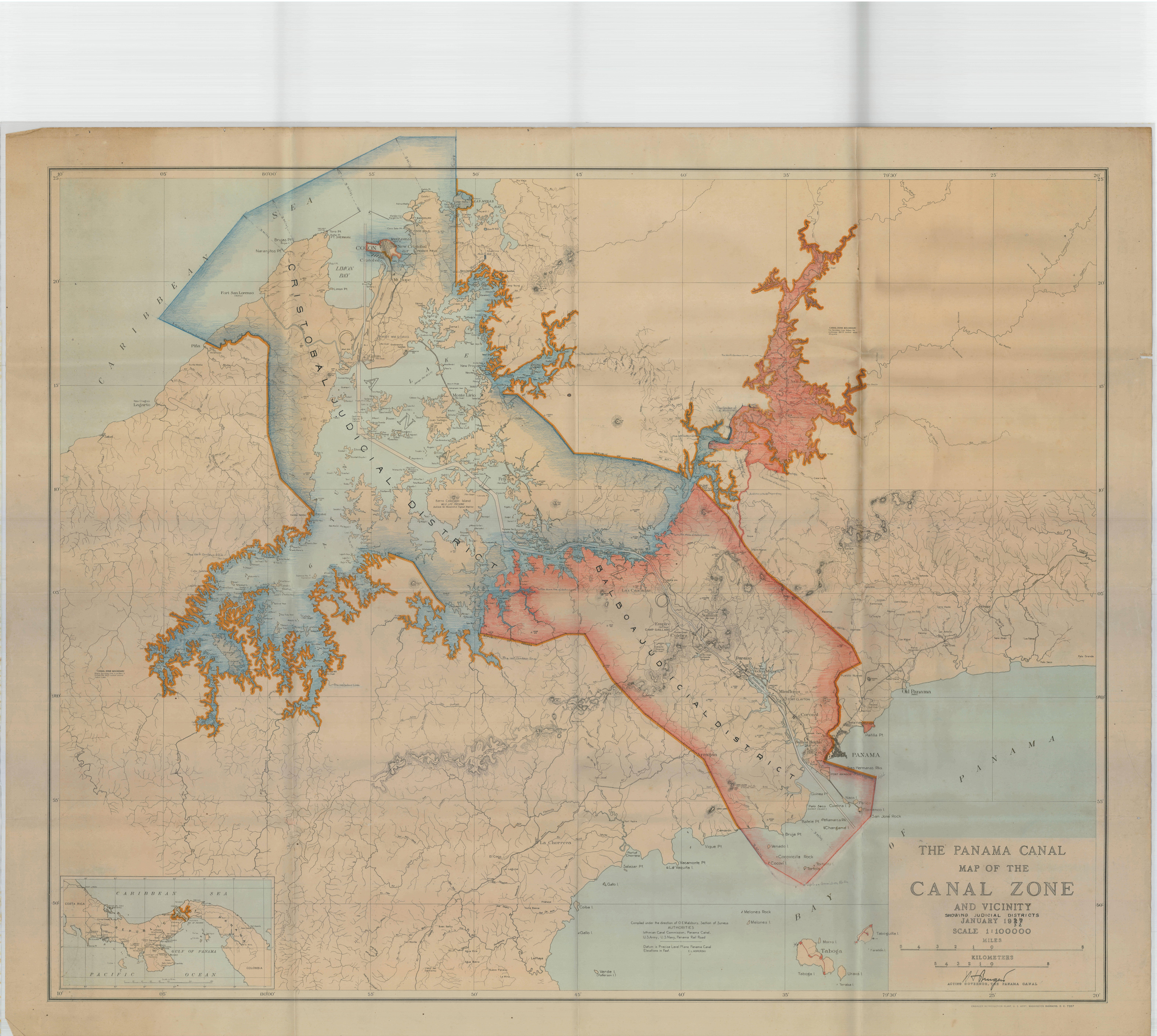
Detail from a 1932 map of the Canal Zone showing the Colón exclave west of the main Zone–Republic boundary

The 1914 boundary treaty made Colón an exclave of the Republic of Panama entirely surrounded by the Panama Canal Zone. Under the 1936 Hull–Alfaro Treaty, the United States ceded the "Colón Corridor" from the Canal Zone; this was a strip under Panamanian jurisdiction just wide enough to build a road 4 miles (6.4 km) long connecting the city to the main eastern portion of the republic. During Panamanian nationalist unrest from the 1950s onwards, the U. S. military sometimes established checkpoints along the Colón Corridor, feeding the resentment that had led to the unrest.

=== Fort De Lesseps ===
Fort De Lesseps was a small U.S. Army Coast Artillery Corps fort located at the northern tip of the city. It was named after the canal developer Ferdinand de Lesseps.

=== From 1948 to 1989 ===
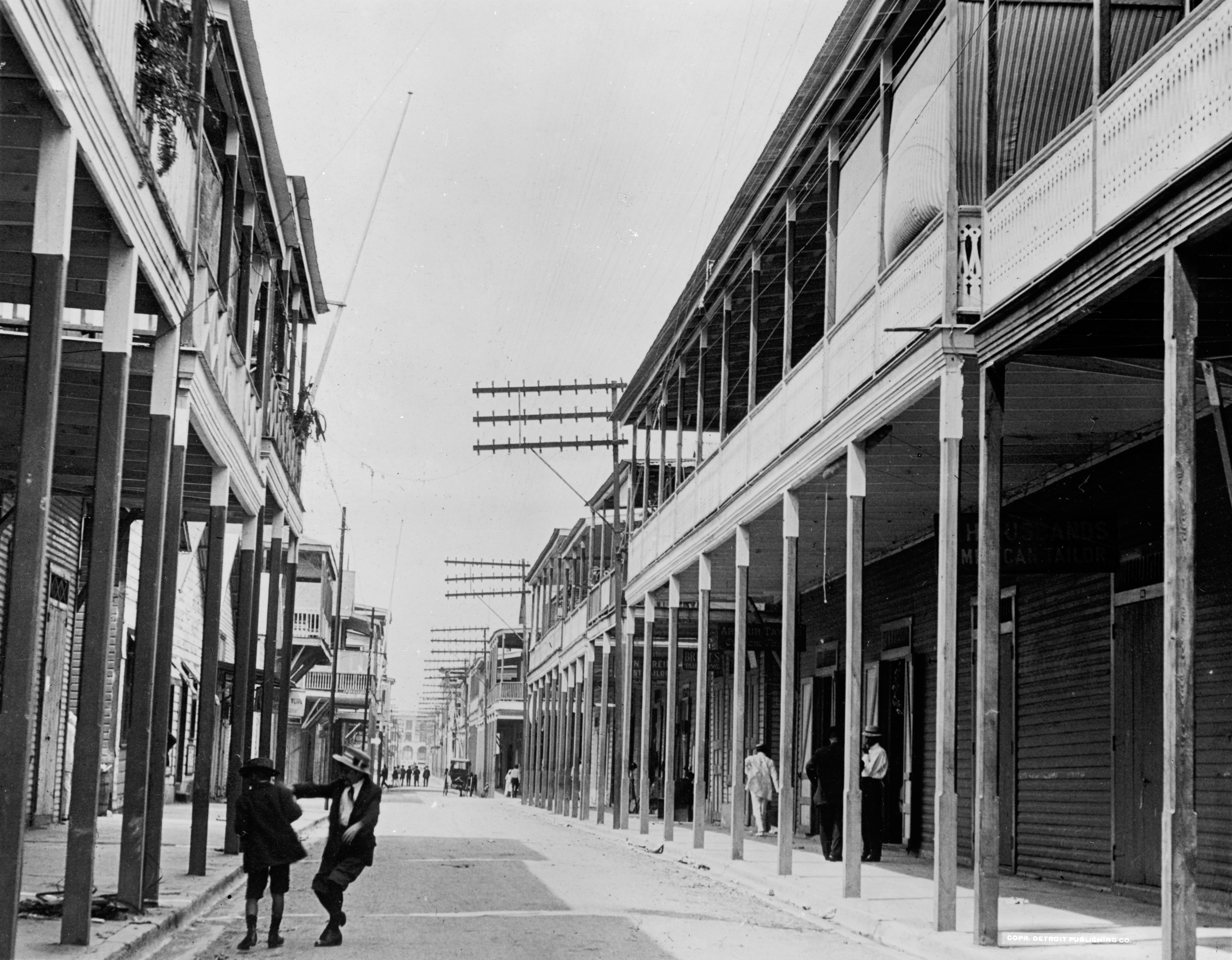
Colón between 1910 and 1920

In 1948, the southeastern corner of Manzanillo Island was designated as the Colón Free Trade Zone. The Free Trade Zone has since been expanded through land reclamation on the Folks River and annexation of parts of France Field (now Enrique Adolfo Jiménez Airport) and Coco Solo.

Politically instigated riots in the 1960s destroyed the city's municipal palace and signaled the start of the city's decline, which was further accelerated by the military dictatorships of Omar Torrijos and Manuel Noriega from 1968 to 1987.

=== Since late 2014 ===
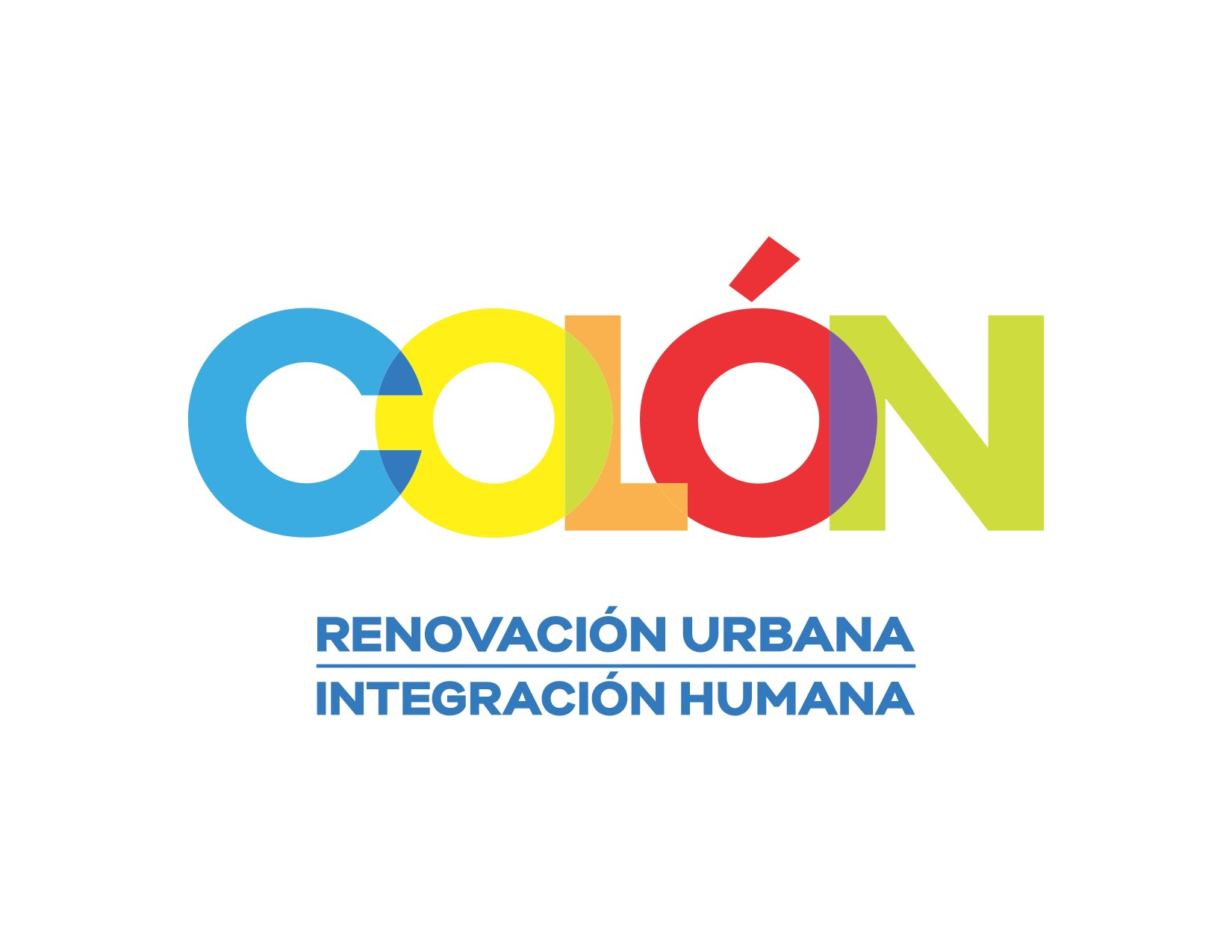

A massive restoration and reconstruction project, involving parks, avenues and historic buildings and monuments, began in late 2014 and uses the hashtags "#RenovaciónColón", "#CiudadDeColón", "#RenovationColon (Renovation of Colón)" and "#CityOfColon". The First Baptist Church of Colón, Panama, is one of the buildings whose renovation has been completed.

== Climate ==
Like most of the Caribbean coast of Central America, Colón possesses an extremely wet tropical climate owing to the powerful, wet trade winds flowing onto high mountains throughout the year. Unlike most parts of this coast, however, February and March are sufficiently dry that Colón fits into the tropical monsoon climate (Köppen Am) category rather than a tropical rainforest climate (Af) as found in most Caribbean coastal areas. Nonetheless, the June-to-December period, with an average monthly rainfall of around 415 mm or 16.3 in, is so wet that Colón rivals La Ceiba, Honduras as the wettest sizable city in Central America.

Climate data for Colon (1991-2020)
| Month | Jan | Feb | Mar | Apr | May | Jun | Jul | Aug | Sep | Oct | Nov | Dec | Year |
|---|---|---|---|---|---|---|---|---|---|---|---|---|---|
| Mean daily maximum °C (°F) | 32.2 (90.0) | 32.8 (91.0) | 33.3 (91.9) | 32.8 (91.0) | 31.7 (89.1) | 31.1 (88.0) | 31.1 (88.0) | 31.1 (88.0) | 30.6 (87.1) | 30.0 (86.0) | 30.6 (87.1) | 31.7 (89.1) | 31.6 (88.9) |
| Daily mean °C (°F) | 26.5 (79.7) | 26.5 (79.7) | 26.5 (79.7) | 27.5 (81.5) | 27.5 (81.5) | 27.0 (80.6) | 26.5 (79.7) | 26.5 (79.7) | 27.5 (81.5) | 26.5 (79.7) | 26.0 (78.8) | 26.5 (79.7) | 26.8 (80.2) |
| Mean daily minimum °C (°F) | 23.3 (73.9) | 23.3 (73.9) | 23.9 (75.0) | 24.4 (75.9) | 24.4 (75.9) | 24.4 (75.9) | 24.4 (75.9) | 24.4 (75.9) | 24.4 (75.9) | 23.9 (75.0) | 23.9 (75.0) | 23.3 (73.9) | 24.0 (75.2) |
| Average precipitation mm (inches) | 47.8 (1.88) | 58.0 (2.28) | 23.4 (0.92) | 71.4 (2.81) | 181.4 (7.14) | 225.8 (8.89) | 234.4 (9.23) | 213.6 (8.41) | 220.5 (8.68) | 256.0 (10.08) | 346.0 (13.62) | 143.3 (5.64) | 2,021.6 (79.58) |
Source: World Meteorological Organization / NOAA

== Population ==
Colón's population in 1900 was 3,001. It grew significantly with the building of the Panama Canal, becoming 31,203 by 1920. In 2000, the population was around 204,000.

With the city's economic decline, many of its upper and middle-class residents left, reducing its ethnic diversity. European and American expatriate communities, as well as Panamanians of Greek, Italian, Jewish, Chinese and Indian/South Asian heritage, started moving to Panama City, to former Canal Zone towns, and overseas.

Today, sizable South Asian and Arab communities live in the remaining prosperous areas of the city, as well as in gated communities outside it. The majority of the city's population is of West Indian or mixed mestizo ancestry.

== Sports ==
Colón is home to Correcaminos Colon, 2016 Basketball Champion of Panama and member of the FIBA Americas League. The team plays its home games at the Arena Teófilo "Panamá" Al Brown.

== Transport ==
The city is served by the Panama Canal Railway and Enrique Adolfo Jiménez Airport.

== People from Colón ==
=== Arts, sciences, politics, and military ===
- Kenneth B. Clark, psychologist, educator, testified in Brown v. Board of Education
- Billy Cobham, musician, songwriter, bandleader, educator
- Pedro Heilbron, CEO of Copa Holdings
- Eric Jackson, publisher, journalist and talk show host
- Delia de Leon (1901–1993), British actress, born in Colón
- Jack de Leon (1902–1956), British theatre manager, impresario and playwright
- John McCain, American politician, born in the U.S. Navy hospital at the Coco Solo submarine base; the site is now in Colón
- George E. Pierce, U.S. Navy Rear Admiral and double Navy Cross recipient
- Juan Williams, political commentator on Fox News

=== Athletes ===
- Antonio Amaya (1945–2025), professional boxer
- Alfonso "Panama" Al Brown, boxer, first Hispanic World Champion
- Celestino Caballero, boxer, WBA Super Bantamweight Champion, IBF Super Bantamweight Champion
- Rod Carew, Major League Baseball player, inducted in 1991 to the Baseball Hall of Fame
- Gary Forbes, National Basketball Association player
- Ruben Garces, College and Professional basketball player, power forward and center
- George Headley (1909-1983), West Indies cricketer born in Colón
- Miguel Iriarte, boxer, fought for the WBA world Bantamweight title in 1982
- Ismael Laguna, boxer, World Featherweight Champion in 1965 and 1970
- Jorge Lujan, boxer, WBA and lineal world bantamweight champion
- Ben Oglivie, Major League Baseball player
- Irving Saladino, athlete, long jump
- Manny Sanguillén, catcher for the Pittsburgh Pirates
- Rennie Stennett, Major League Baseball for the Pittsburgh Pirates.
- Armando Dely Valdés, football player
- Jorge Dely Valdés, football player
- Julio Dely Valdés, football player

== See also ==
- Fort Sherman
- List of former United States military installations in Panama
