= Catholic Church in Samoa =

The Catholic Church in Samoa is part of the worldwide Catholic Church, which, initiated by the life, death and resurrection of Jesus Christ, and under the spiritual leadership of the Pope and Roman curia in the Vatican City (within Rome) is the largest Christian church in the world. Catholic missionaries arrived in Samoa in 1845 and today Catholics account for around 20% of the overall population. Archbishop Alapati Lui Mataeliga was ordained as head of the Archdiocese of Samoa-Apia in 2003.

== Demographics ==
According to Samoa's 2016 census there were 36,766 Catholics in Samoa, out of a total population of 195,979. The population of Samoa is about 99% Christian.

According to the CIA World Factbook, in the 2001 census, Catholics accounted for 19.6% of the population, being the second largest Christian denomination after Congregationalist at 34.8%.

In 2020 there were 65 priest and 62 nuns serving 60 parishes.

== History ==
Prior to the arrival of European visitors, Samoa had a complex polytheistic religion which also incorporated elements of ancestor worship. The war goddess (Nafanua) had prophesied that there would come a new religion which would end the rule of the old. Christian sailors had been visiting Samoa from the late 18th century, and had been teaching Christianity and some locals had converted. In 1830, the London Missionary Society arrived at Sapapalii. In 1836 Pope Gregory XVI commissioned the Marist Fathers to bring Catholicism to the Western Pacific and missionaries from this French religious institute arrived in Samoa in 1845. In 1848, the first version of the New Testament was printed in the Samoan language, followed by a Samoan version of the Old Testament in 1855. Catholics and Protestants competed for converts amidst a backdrop of Imperial rivalries between Catholic France and Protestant Britain. Christianity took firm root in the islands and attendance at Church on Sundays has remained high to the present day

In 1896, Mgr. Broyer was appointed Vicar Apostolic of Samoa and Tokelau, with residence at Apia. In 1954, Pio Taofinu'u was ordained as Polynesia's first Catholic Cardinal. In 2006, having been made the first Pacific and first Samoan Cardinal, he died at the age of 82. In 2007, in a ceremony organized by the Catholic Church, the Samoan head of state asked for divine forgiveness of his country's sins. At World Youth Day 2008, "up to a thousand" Samoan youths participated in the activities in Sydney.

Churches of various denominations are often the grandest buildings in Samoan villages. The Mulivai Catholic Cathedral is located in Apia. Catholic religious organisations have been active in health, education and social work in Samoa, including the work of religious institutes including the Marist Brothers and Little Sisters of the Poor.

== See also ==
- Religion in Samoa
