= Immaculate Conception Cathedral, Iquique =

Coordinates: 20.2119°S 70.1497°W

Immaculate Conception Cathedral
- Catedral de la Inmaculada Concepción
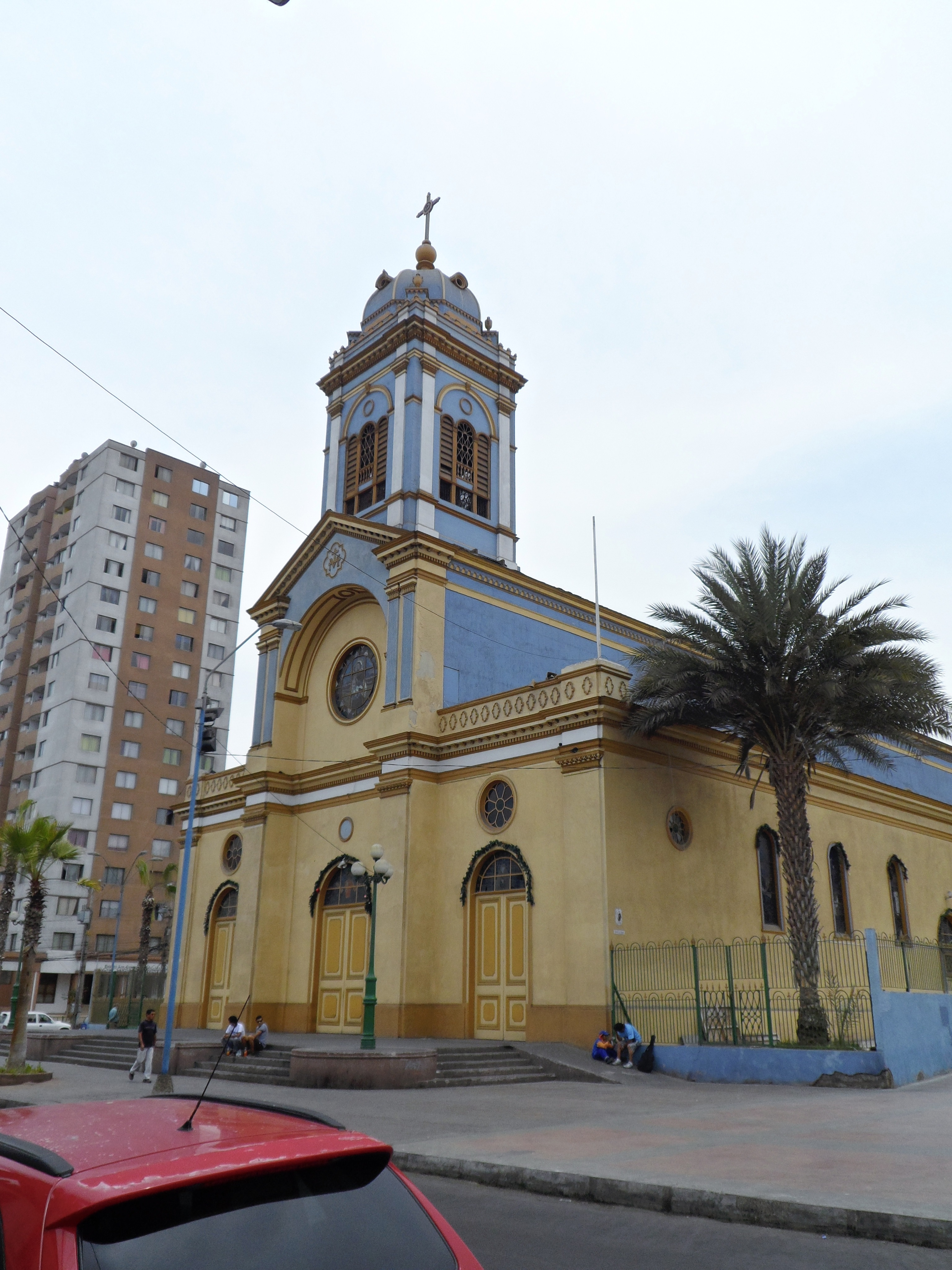
- Immaculate Conception Cathedral
- Location: Iquique
- Country: Chile
- Denomination: Roman Catholic Church

The Immaculate Conception Cathedral (Spanish: Catedral de la Inmaculada Concepción) also called Iquique Cathedral It is a cathedral church of Catholic worship, home of the Roman Catholic Diocese of Iquique in the northern part of the South American country of Chile. It was consecrated in 1882 under the patronage of the Immaculate Conception of Mary.

It was built thanks to the fund campaign initiated by the Apostolic Vicar Camilo Ortuzar, after the parish church of Iquique was destroyed by fire on May 10, 1833. In May 1884 the remains of Arturo Prat and others who fell in the naval Battle of Iquique were transferred to the temple, where they remained until moved to Valparaiso in 1888, and in 1885 its construction was completed. In 1929, due to the creation of the Diocese of Iquique, the church acquired the rank of Cathedral.

In 1989 the cathedral, together with the parochial houses attached to it, was declared a historical monument (Monumento histórico).

== See also ==
- Roman Catholicism in Chile
- Immaculate Conception Cathedral
