= Basilica Cathedral (disambiguation) =

Basilica Cathedral of Arequipa is in Arepuipa, Peru.

Basilica Cathedral may also refer to:

- Vannes Cathedral, also known as Basilica Cathedral St. Peter and St. Patern, Vannes
- Basilica of Our Lady of the Pillar, also known as Our Lady of the Pilar Basilica-Cathedral

== See also ==
- Cathedral of the Immaculate Conception (disambiguation)
- Cathedral Basilica (disambiguation)
- Basilica
