= Cathedral Basilica of Mérida, Venezuela =

Cathedral Basilica of the Immaculate Conception
- Catedral Basílica Menor de la Inmaculada Concepción de Mérida
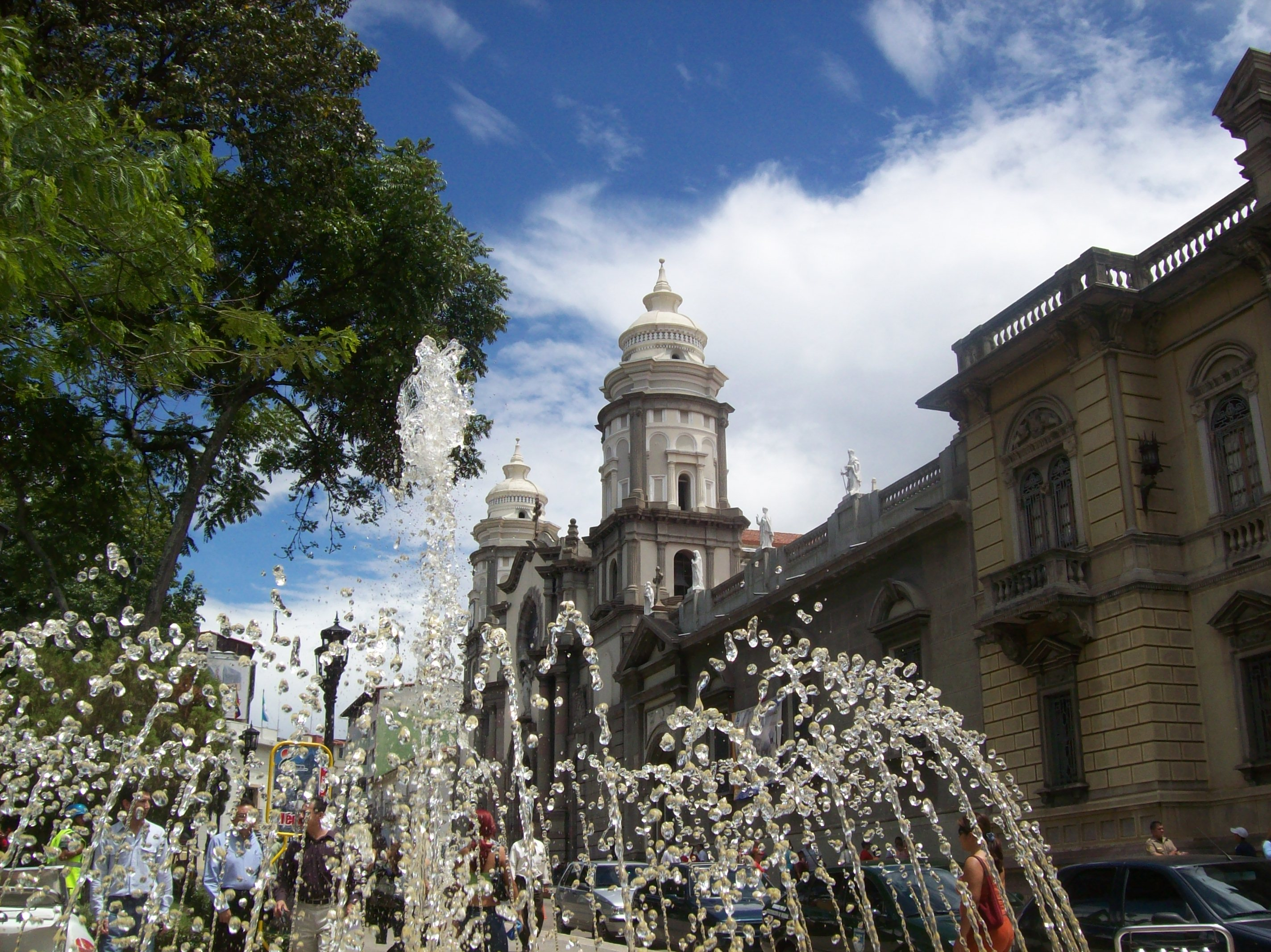
- Cathedral Basilica of the Immaculate Conception
- 8.59708°N 71.14383°W
- Location: Mérida
- Country: Venezuela
- Denomination: Roman Catholic Church

The Cathedral Basilica of the Immaculate Conception (Spanish: Catedral Basílica Menor de la Inmaculada Concepción de Mérida) or Metropolitan Cathedral of Mérida is a religious building of the Roman Catholic church located in the city of Mérida in western Venezuela, in the state of the same name, part of the Andean region in that country.

It is the seat of the Archdiocese of Mérida. It was built from 1805 with various modifications until 1960. It has numerous stained glass and religious objects of great historical value.

It was built near the Plaza Bolivar in Mérida and the Archbishop's Palace and Archdiocesan Museum.

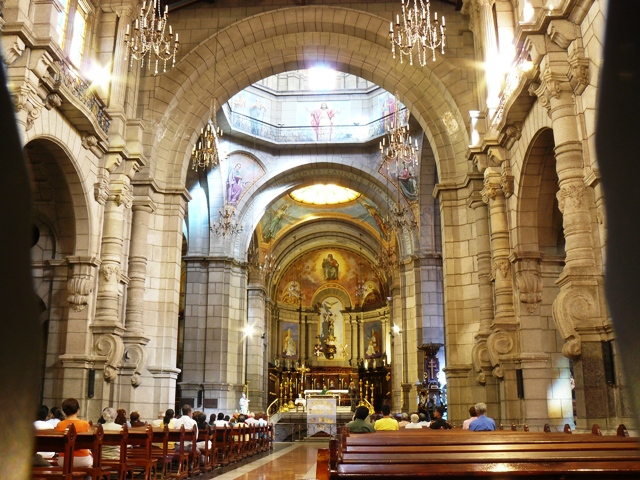
Internal view

== See also ==
- Roman Catholicism in Venezuela
