= Immaculate Conception Cathedral, Colón =

Coordinates: 9.36097°N 79.90397°W

Immaculate Conception Cathedral
- Catedral de la Inmaculada Concepción
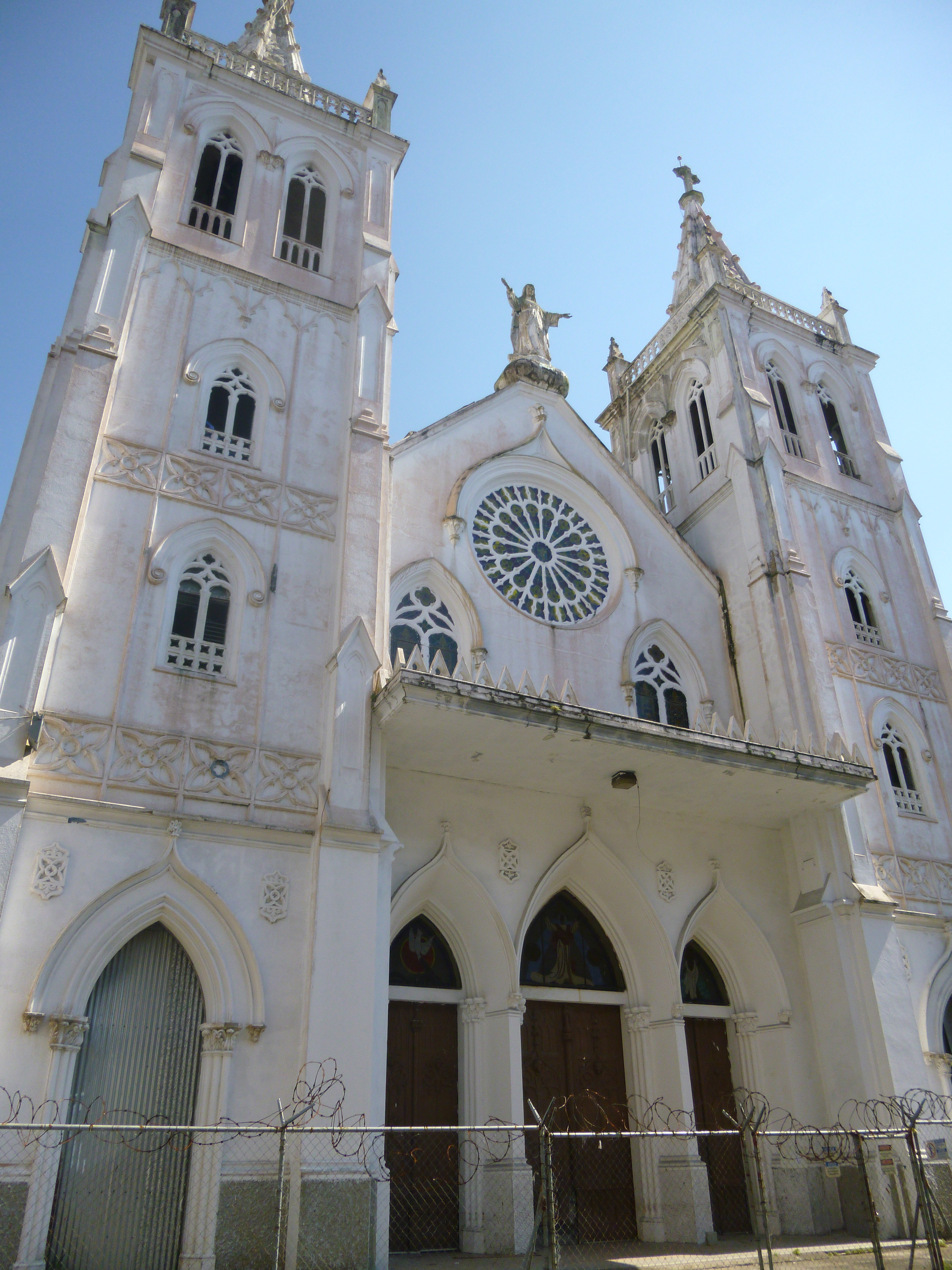
- Immaculate Conception Cathedral
- Location: Colón, Panama
- Country: Panama
- Denomination: Roman Catholic Church

The Immaculate Conception Cathedral (Spanish: Catedral de la Inmaculada Concepción) or Cathedral of Colón and more formally called the Cathedral of the Immaculate Conception of Mary is a religious building belonging to the Catholic Church, and located in the city of Colón to the north of Panama.

Follow the Latin or Roman rite and is the seat of the constituency of the Diocese of Colón-Kuna Yala (Latin: Columbensis-Kunayalensis) created on June 13, 1997, and depends on the ecclesiastical province of Panama.

== See also ==
- Roman Catholicism in Panama
