= Immaculate Conception Cathedral, La Vega =

Immaculate Conception Cathedral
- Catedral de la Inmaculada Concepción
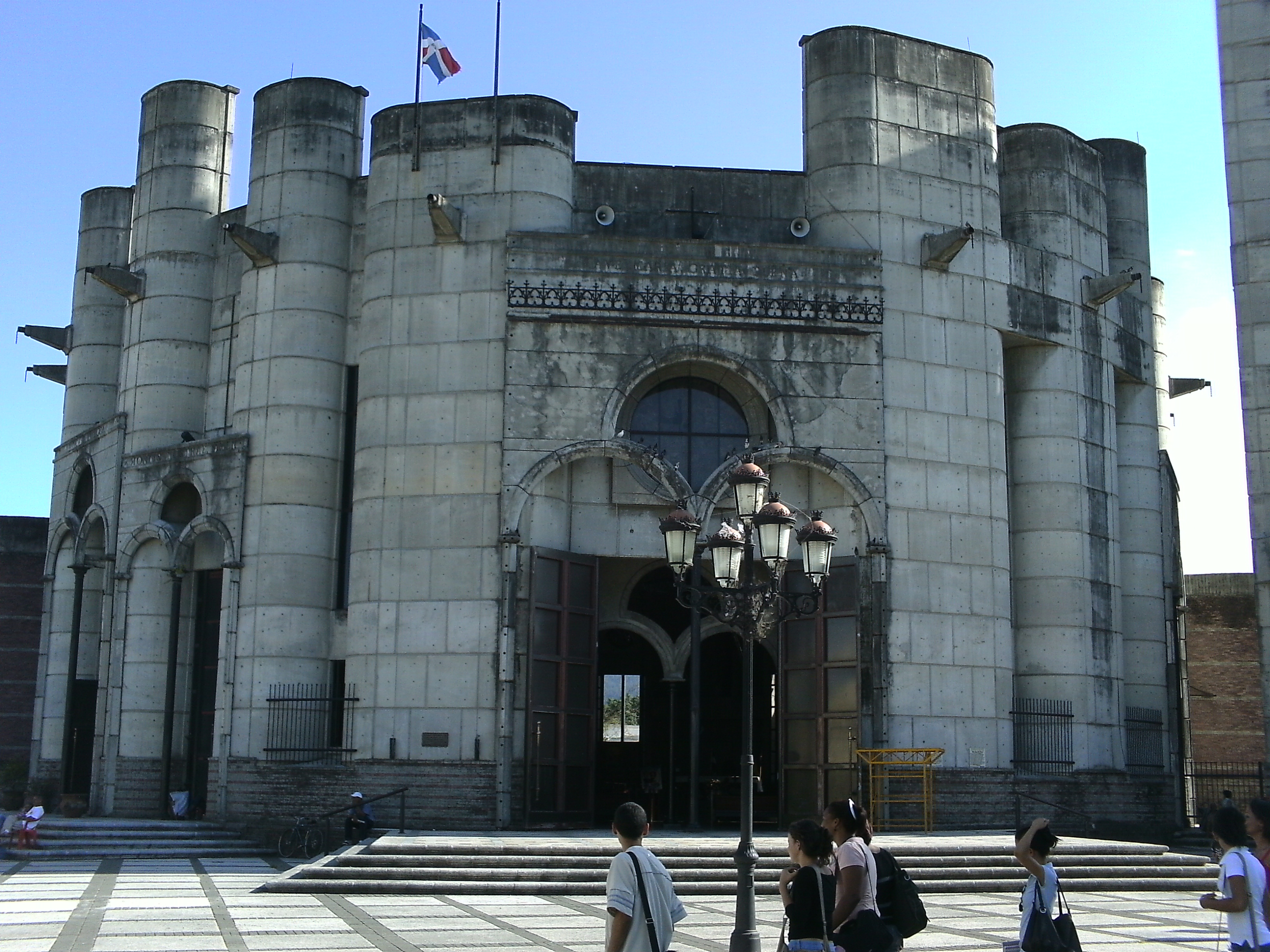
- Immaculate Conception Cathedral
- 19°13′26″N 70°31′58″W
- Location: La Vega
- Country: Dominican Republic
- Denomination: Roman Catholic Church

The Immaculate Conception Cathedral (Spanish: Catedral de la Inmaculada Concepción) also called The Cathedral of La Vega, it is a religious building of the Catholic Church located in the city of La Vega, Dominican Republic. It is the cathedral of the Diocese of La Vega and one of the most important shrines of the Dominican Republic.

The design of the cathedral, located opposite the central park of this city, corresponded to the Dominican architect Pedro Mena Lajara and was inaugurated on February 22, 1992, by the then president of that country Joaquin Balaguer, who handed the keys to the Bishop Monsignor Juan Antonio Flores. Since its inception, this religious monument became a place of choice for both parishioners and devotees of the Virgin Mary, as domestic and foreign tourists.

== Celebrations Schedule ==
Monday to Friday

- 6:30 AM (Morning)
- 5:30 PM (17:30 afternoon)

Saturday

- 6:30 AM (Morning)
- 5:00 PM (17:00 afternoon)

Sunday

- 6:30 AM (Morning)
- 8:30 AM (Morning)
- 10:30 AM (Morning)
- 6:00 PM (18:00 afternoon)

Updated on (11/07/2026)

== See also ==
- Roman Catholicism in the Dominican Republic

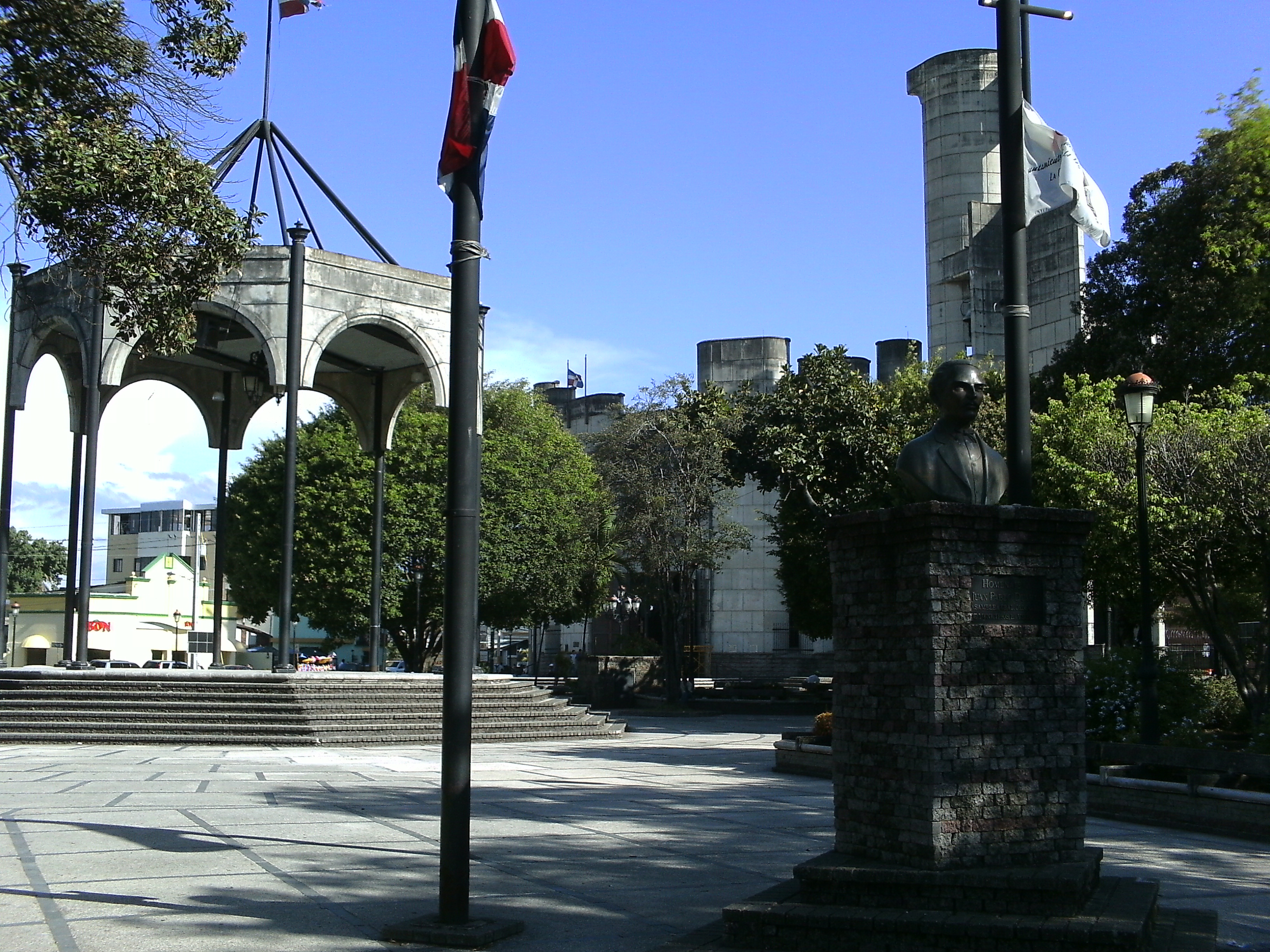
Another view
