= Apatzingán Cathedral =

Immaculate Conception Cathedral
- Catedral de la Inmaculada Concepción
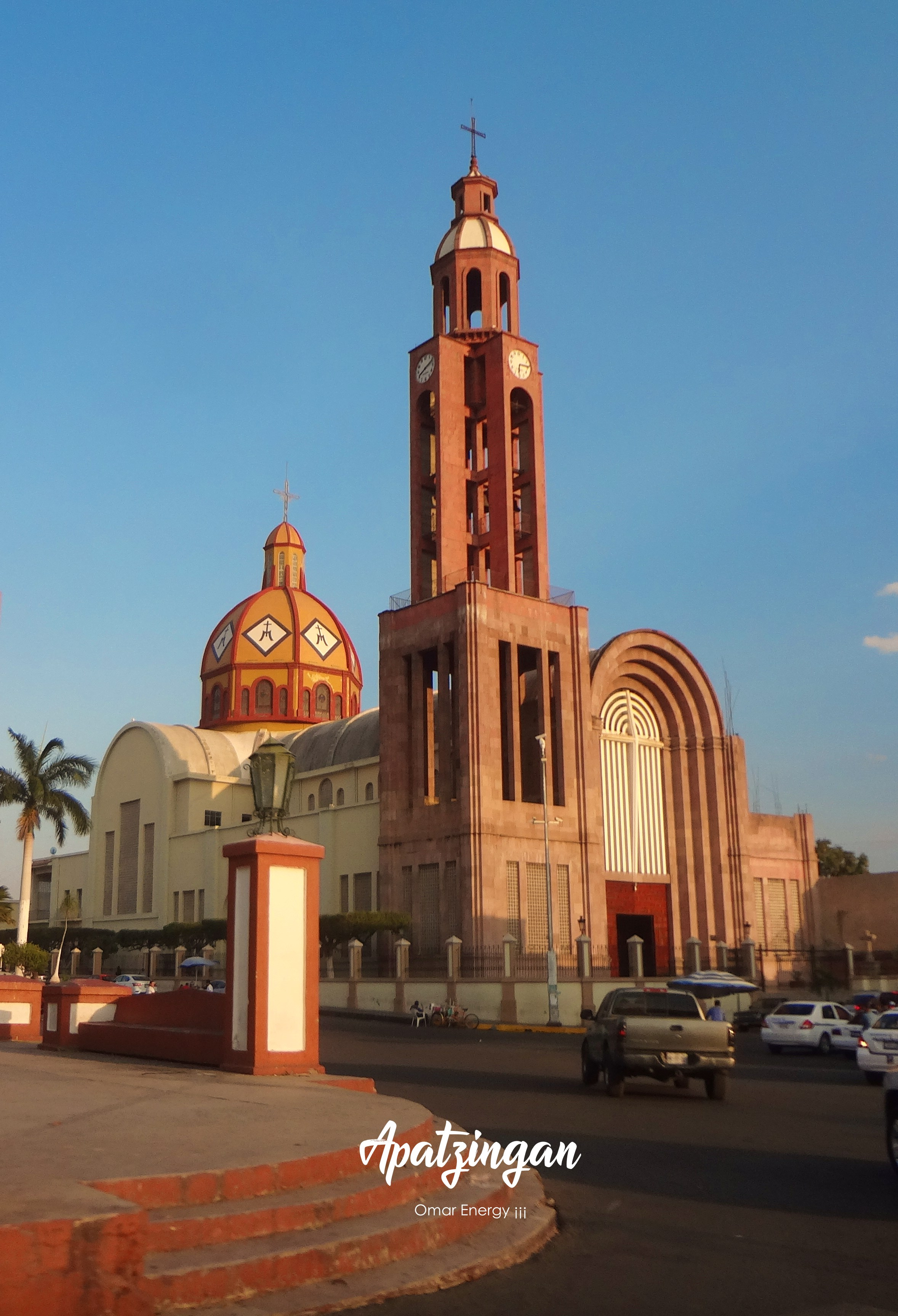

- Location within Michoacán Location within Mexico
- Immaculate Conception Cathedral
- 19°05′11″N 102°21′15″W
- Location: Apatzingán
- Country: Mexico
- Denomination: Roman Catholic Church

The Immaculate Conception Cathedral (also Apatzingán Cathedral; Spanish: Catedral de la Inmaculada Concepción) is a Catholic church in the city of Apatzingán, Michoacán, Mexico. It is a Modernist building and the headquarters of the Diocese of Apatzingán. It was built in the second half of the 20th century.

Before the present building, there was another building of simple proportions, possibly built in the sixteenth century. The old building, made of adobe and stone, consisted of a single nave that supported a gabled roof covered by tile. The portal, very simple, consisted of a semicircular arch, topped by a cornice and a small window in the choir loft. On the right side was the bell tower, with three sections and a cupola, which had a clock.

At the beginning of the second half of the twentieth century, and with the growth of the city and the need for greater space for parishioners, it was decided to demolish the previous construction in order to build a new building in accordance with the ideal of progress that predominated in the region. It was decided to build it in modernist style that was in vogue at the time.

The new building was elevated to the rank of cathedral on July 24, 1962, with the creation of the Diocese of Apatzingán.

== See also ==
- Roman Catholicism in Mexico
- Immaculate Conception Cathedral
