= Cathedral Basilica of St. Joseph =

There are at least two buildings known as Cathedral Basilica of St. Joseph:

- Cathedral Basilica of St. Joseph in Edmonton, Alberta, Canada
- Cathedral Basilica of St. Joseph (San Jose, California) in San Jose, California, United States
