= Apatzingán =

- City and municipality
- Apatzingán de la Constitución
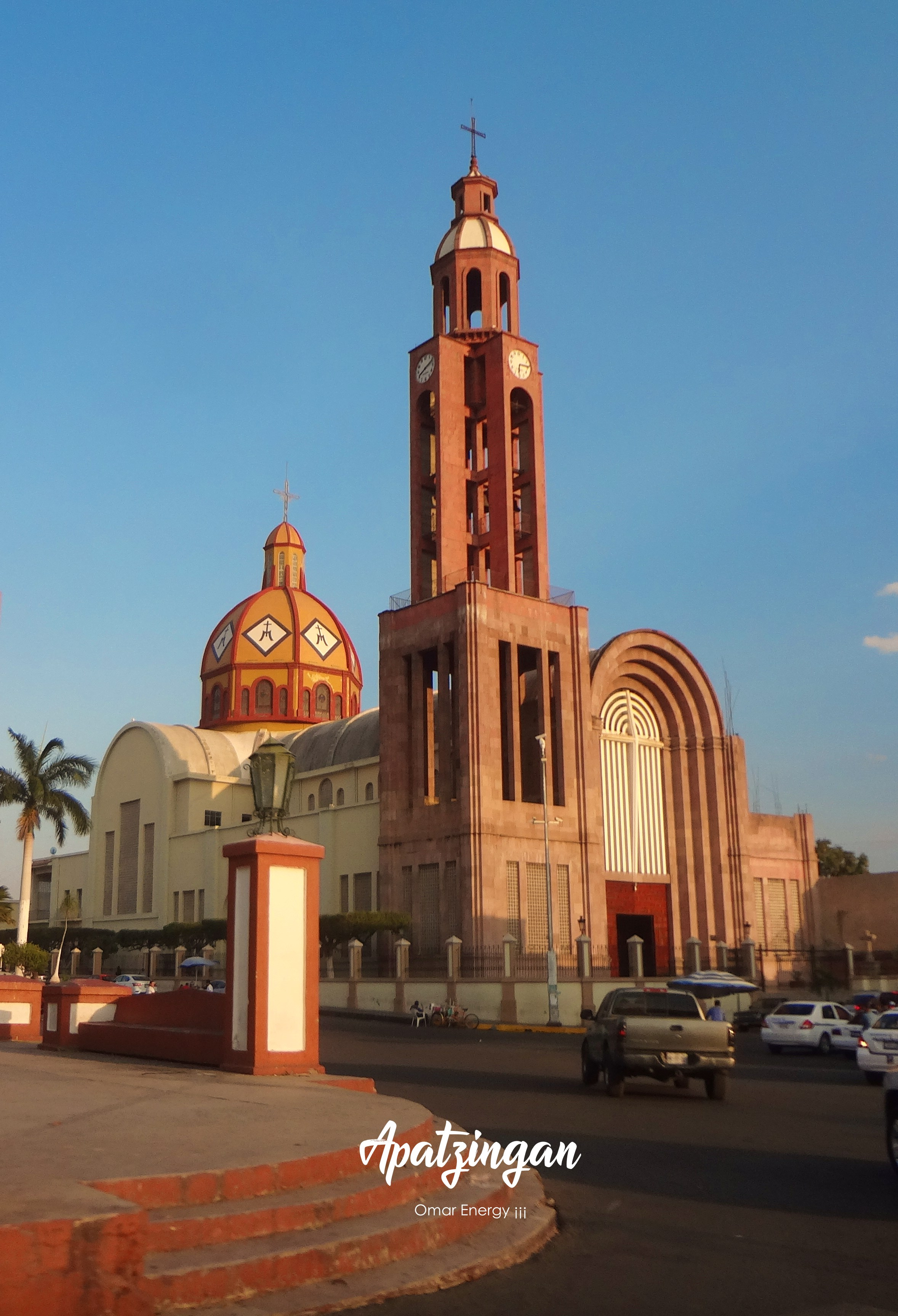
- Immaculate Conception Cathedral, Apatzingán, Michoacán Mexico

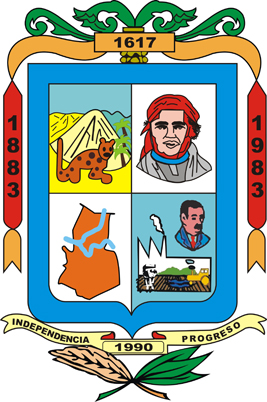
- Coat of arms
- Nicknames: La Perla de Tierra Caliente, Cuna de la Constitución Mexicana
- Location of Apatzingán in Mexico Apatzingán (Mexico)
- Coordinates: 19°05′19″N 102°21′03″W
- Country: Mexico
- State: Michoacán
- Founded: 1617

Government
  - Municipal President: Jose Torres (PRI)

Area
  - Total: 24 km^{2} (9.3 sq mi)
- Elevation: 325 m (1,066 ft)

Population (2020)
  - Total: 102,362
  - Density: 4,300/km^{2} (11,000/sq mi)
  - Municipality: 126,191
- Time zone: UTC-6 (CST)
- Postal code: 60600 - 60753
- Area code: 453
- Website: Official website

Apatzingán (in full, Apatzingán de la Constitución) is a city and municipal seat of the municipality of Apatzingán in the west-central region of the Mexican state of Michoacán.

== History ==
Mexico's Constitution of Apatzingán was signed in the city in 1814, during the Mexican War of Independence in the Viceroyalty of New Spain against the Spanish Empire.

Six federal police officers were charged with murder on August 21, 2019 for their supposed involvement in a police operation that left nine dead on January 6, 2015 in Apatzingán. At least nine people died and several were injured when police fired against members and sympathizers of self-defense groups who had taken over the municipal palace.

== Geography ==
The Municipality of Apatzingán is located in the Tierra Caliente Valley. It has an area of 1,656.67 km^{2} (639.64 sq mi), and reported a population of 99,010 (2010).

The city of Apatzingán is the sixth-largest in Michoacán (behind Morelia, Uruapan, Zamora, Lázaro Cárdenas, and Zitácuaro), with a 2015 census population of 128,250 persons.

The major Sierra Madre del Sur mountain range and the municipality of Coalcomán de Vázquez Pallares are to the west.

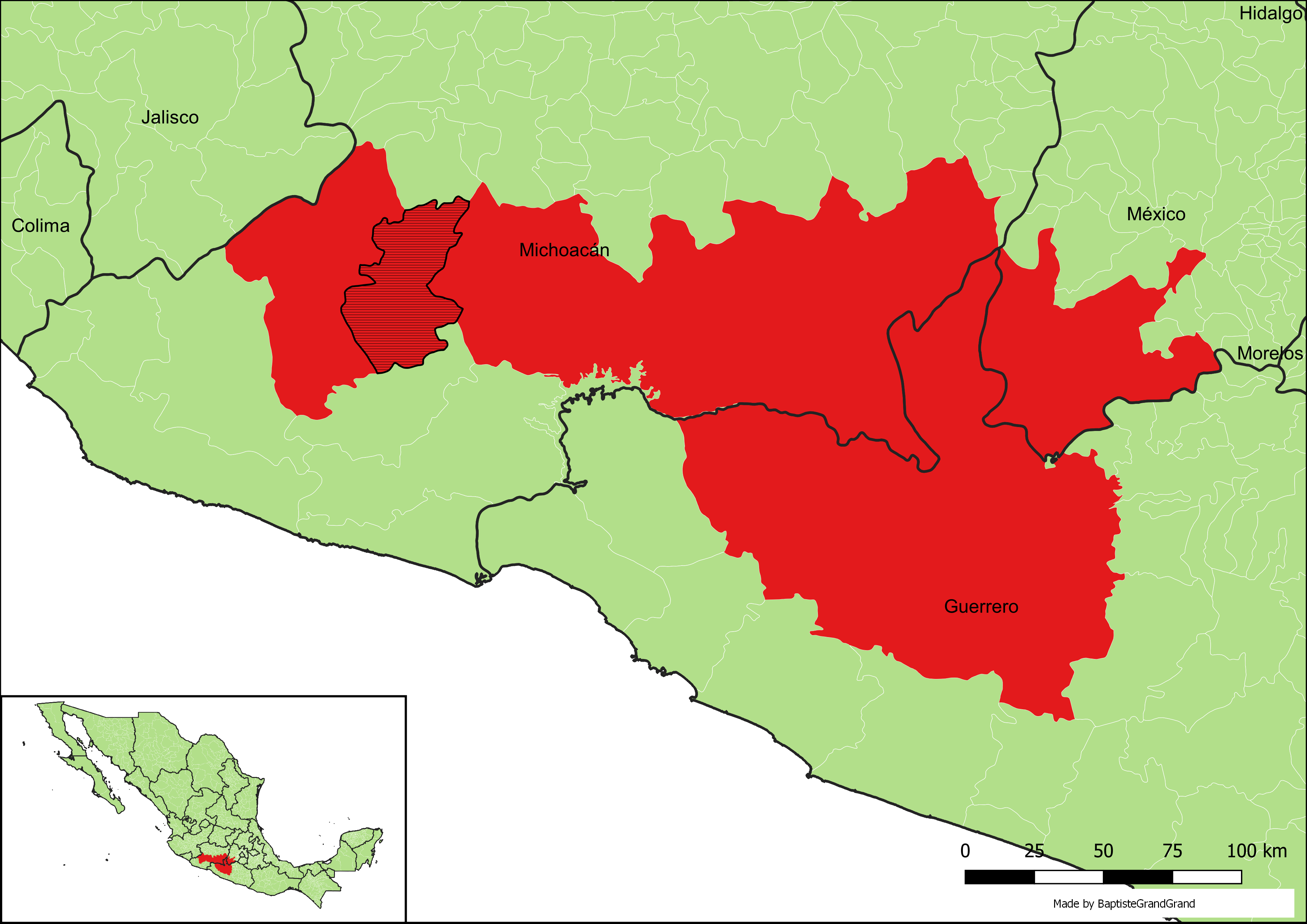
Apatzingán in the Tierra Caliente region.

=== Climate ===
Despite having an annual precipitation of 752 millimetres (29.6 in), Apatzingán has a semi-arid climate (Köppen climate classification BSh) due to its hot temperatures and high evaporation rates.

Climate data for Apatzingán
Month	Jan	Feb	Mar	Apr	May	Jun	Jul	Aug	Sep	Oct	Nov	Dec	Year
Record high °C (°F)	38.0 (100.4)	39.0 (102.2)	42.0 (107.6)	43.0 (109.4)	46.5 (115.7)	44.0 (111.2)	43.0 (109.4)	39.5 (103.1)	39.0 (102.2)	41.5 (106.7)	43.0 (109.4)	37.0 (98.6)	46.5 (115.7)
Mean daily maximum °C (°F)	32.3 (90.1)	33.8 (92.8)	36.4 (97.5)	39.0 (102.2)	40.0 (104.0)	37.8 (100.0)	34.7 (94.5)	34.1 (93.4)	33.7 (92.7)	34.1 (93.4)	34.0 (93.2)	32.9 (91.2)	35.2 (95.4)
Daily mean °C (°F)	24.7 (76.5)	26.0 (78.8)	28.4 (83.1)	30.7 (87.3)	32.7 (90.9)	31.6 (88.9)	29.2 (84.6)	28.5 (83.3)	28.2 (82.8)	28.2 (82.8)	27.3 (81.1)	25.7 (78.3)	28.4 (83.1)
Mean daily minimum °C (°F)	17.1 (62.8)	18.1 (64.6)	20.3 (68.5)	22.4 (72.3)	25.4 (77.7)	25.5 (77.9)	23.6 (74.5)	22.9 (73.2)	22.7 (72.9)	22.2 (72.0)	20.7 (69.3)	18.5 (65.3)	21.6 (70.9)
Record low °C (°F)	8.5 (47.3)	10.0 (50.0)	13.0 (55.4)	13.0 (55.4)	17.5 (63.5)	15.0 (59.0)	17.0 (62.6)	18.5 (65.3)	19.0 (66.2)	14.0 (57.2)	11.0 (51.8)	10.0 (50.0)	8.5 (47.3)
Average precipitation mm (inches)	17.1 (0.67)	1.1 (0.04)	0.8 (0.03)	0.6 (0.02)	11.2 (0.44)	129.5 (5.10)	166.2 (6.54)	175.2 (6.90)	148.5 (5.85)	81.9 (3.22)	14.6 (0.57)	5.2 (0.20)	751.9 (29.60)
Average precipitation days (≥ 0.1 mm)	1.3	0.4	0.3	0.2	1.6	11.4	14.6	14.3	12.3	5.6	1.5	0.6	64.1
Source: Servicio Meteorologico Nacional

== See also ==
- Immaculate Conception Cathedral, Apatzingán
