= Cathedral of the Immaculate Conception (San Carlos, Cojedes) =

Coordinates: 9.66156°N 68.59034°W

- Catedral de la Inmaculada Concepción de San Carlos
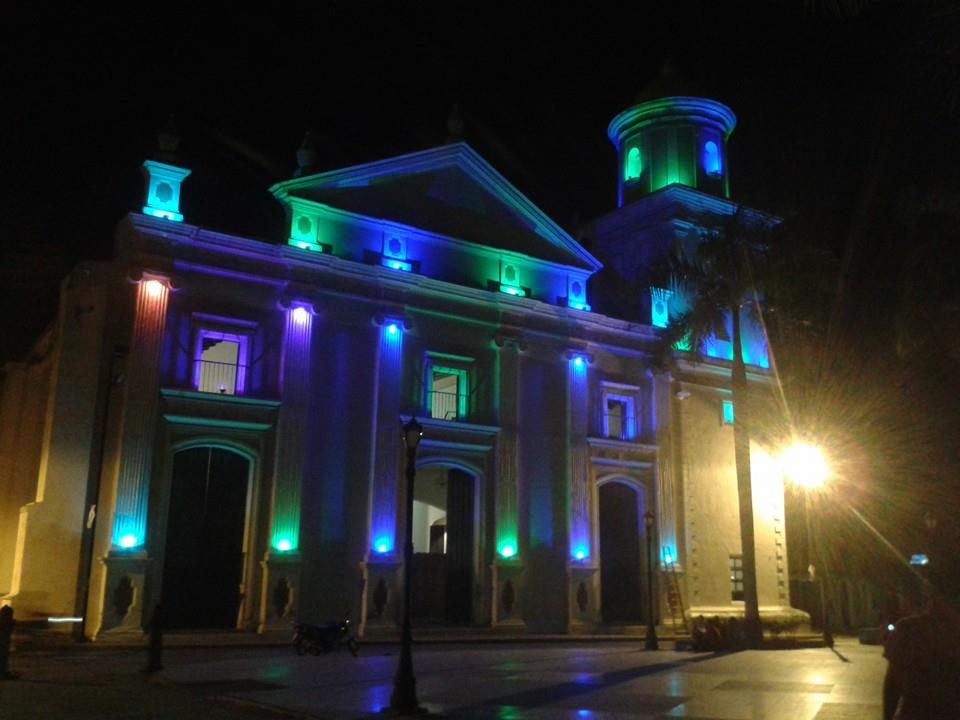
- Cathedral of the Immaculate Conception
- Location: San Carlos
- Country: Venezuela
- Denomination: Roman Catholic Church

The Cathedral of the Immaculate Conception (Spanish: Catedral de la Inmaculada Concepción de San Carlos) or simply Cathedral of San Carlos is a religious building belonging to the Catholic Church and is located between Silva Avenue and Sucre Street, in the town of San Carlos, the capital city of Cojedes State, in the plains of the South American country of Venezuela. It has been declared a national historical monument so it is a protected site.

The temple follows the Roman or Latin rite and functions as the headquarters of the Diocese of San Carlos (Dioecesis Sancti Caroli in Venetiola) created on 16 May 1972 by bull In vertice of Pope Paul VI.

It is under the pastoral responsibility of the Bishop Polito Rodríguez Méndez. The original cathedral building dates back to 1680. It was completely remodeled in 1957.

== See also ==
- Roman Catholicism in Venezuela
