= Immaculate Conception Cathedral, Apia =

Coordinates: 13°49′55.9″S 171°45′59.49″W

Immaculate Conception Cathedral
- The new cathedral in 2016
- Immaculate Conception Cathedral
- Location: Apia
- Country: Samoa
- Denomination: Roman Catholic Church

Administration
- Archdiocese: Archdiocese of Samoa–Apia

Clergy
- Archbishop: Most Rev. Mosese Vitolio Tui

The Immaculate Conception Cathedral (also called Cathedral of Apia or Mulivai Cathedral) is the Catholic cathedral in Apia, the capital of Samoa, an insular country in Oceania. It suffered damage in the earthquake of 2009, and has undergone restoration and extension.

The congregation follows the Roman or Latin rite and is the mother church of the Archdiocese of Samoa–Apia (Latin: Archidioecesis Samoa–Apiana; Samoan: Fa'aAkiepikopo Samoa–Apia), which was created in 1966 by Pope Paul VI through the bull "Prophetarum voes".

After three years of repairs, the new cathedral of Apia was opened to the public on 2 June 2014 in the presence of Archbishop Martin Krebs, the apostolic nuncio in New Zealand. The church was rebuilt on the site of the original cathedral, which dated from 1857.

== History ==
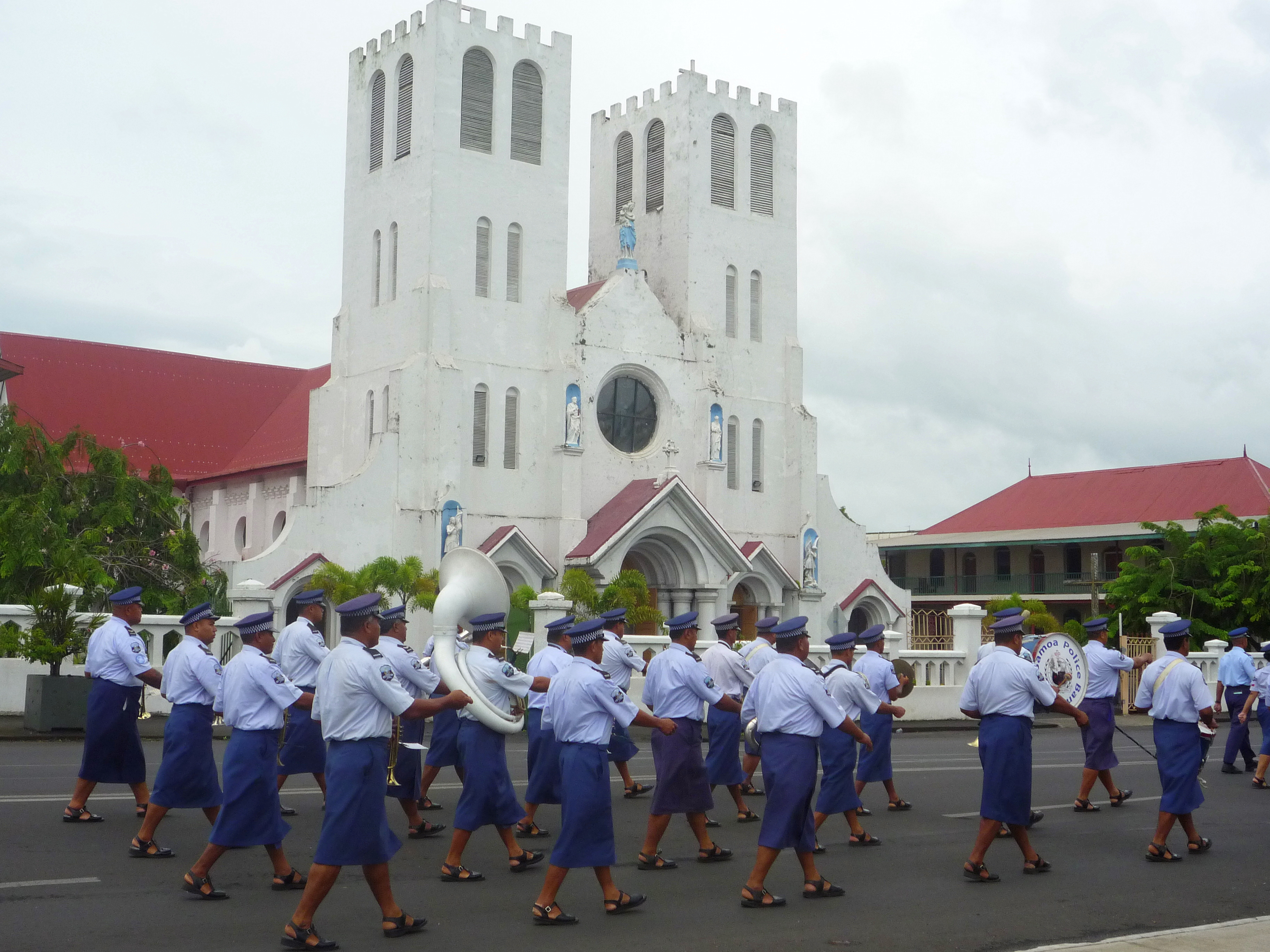
The old cathedral with the Police Band of Samoa

In 1852, William Pritchard sold a plot of land in Mulivai, about three-quarters of an acre (or 3000 m²), to Bishop Bataillon, onto which Bataillon's brother, Jacques, began building a church and a parish house. The first stone was blessed by the bishop on 8 December 1852, but work was interrupted by epidemics and a tropical cyclone in 1854, which destroyed eight ships and caused great damage to the plantations, resulting in problems with the food supply. As a result, the church was completed in 1857.

The church stood in the same place as the current one, while the residence was near Mulivai.

== See also ==
- Roman Catholicism in Samoa
- Immaculate Conception
