= Apifo'ou College =

School in Tonga

‘Apifo‘ou College

Location
- ‘Apifo‘ou, Hala Fātima, Ma'ufanga, Tonga; 21.1439°S 175.1780°W

Information
- Motto: Adveniat Regnum Tuum
- Religious affiliation: Roman Catholic
- Patron saint: St. Peter Chanel
- Founded: 1865
- Founder: Fr. Jean-Amand Lamaze S.M.
- Oversight: Diocese of Tonga and Niue
- Principal: Fr. Valu Siua S.M.
- Enrollment: 1400 students (in 2019)
- Language: Tongan & English
- Colors: Sky-blue & white
- Nickname: Lalo Kāsia
- Website: https://www.apifoou.college

‘Apifo‘ou College (Tongan: Kolisi ‘Apifo‘ou) is a co-educational secondary school located at Ma’ufanga on the island of Tongatapu in the Kingdom of Tonga. It is the largest and oldest Catholic secondary school in Tonga. It is owned by the Roman Catholic Diocese of Tonga and Niue, and is run by priests of the Society of Mary.

== History ==
‘Apifo‘ou College traces its foundation to 1865 when French Marist priest, Fr. Jean-Amand Lamaze, founded an all-boys secondary school named St. Stanislaus at ‘Ahopanilolo, Ma’ufanga with a syllabus that included reading, writing, geography, history, arithmetic, astronomy, geometry and catechism. With a view to expanding the school, St. Stanislaus College was moved around 1886-1887 to the nearby property of Vusi to continue as a day school with Fr. Armand Olier as the first teacher and Principal at the 'new property' (Tongan: 'Api Fo'ou). With the arrival of Fr. Emilien Thomas in Tonga in February 1888, he became soon thereafter the first resident priest at the college which became a boarding school in 1889, with the college name changed from St. Stanislaus to Blessed Peter Chanel who was beatified that year. On account of its strategic location, the college was relocated to Meleka from April 1942 so as to allow Allied forces to set up camp at 'Api Fo'ou; the college did not return to 'Api Fo'ou until February 1943. In an effort to raise the academic standard, Bishop John Rodgers established St. John's High School at Makamaka in 1962 so as to allow boys to follow the NZ syllabus before relocating it to ‘Api Fo’ou in 1964. The Missionary Sisters of the Society of Mary then set up St. Anne's High School at Makamaka in 1964 as an all-girls school under the NZ syllabus before it, too, along with newly established St. Cecilia at 'Ahopanilolo (since January 1965) were both relocated to ‘Api Fo’ou on September 8, 1965 to form St. Mary's High School. In marking the centenary of 'Api Fo'ou in 1986, Bishop Patelisio Punou-Ki-Hihifo Finau decided to amalgamate the all-boys St. John's High School and all-girls St. Mary's High School in 1987 into a single co-educational school named 'Apifo'ou College under the school's old motto of 'Adveniat Regnum Tuum'. This was followed in 2011 with the celebration of the school's 125-year anniversary, hence counting once again from 1886. However, in 2020, the college celebrated its 155th anniversary, thereby recognizing the college that was first set up at 'Ahopanilolo in 1865 by Fr. Lamaze as its veritable foundation. In 2025, plans to celebrate the college's 160th anniversary, scheduled for April, had to be scaled back due to the death of Pope Francis, with ex-students at home and abroad marking it in a toned-down manner.

== Cyclone Gita ==
Severe tropical Cyclone Gita struck Tonga on February 17, 2018. Of the secondary schools on the island of Tongatapu that were affected by the cyclone, none sustained heavier damage than ‘Apifo’ou College. Rebuilding of the damaged classrooms was completed at the end of 2020 thanks to funding from the World Bank and the Australian government.

== Clergy ==
‘Apifo‘ou College has a long history of being a source of clergy for the local Catholic Diocese of Tonga and Niue and elsewhere. The current bishop, Soane Patita Paini Cardinal Mafi, is a past student of the school, as were two of his predecessors, Patelisio Punou-Ki-Hihifo Finau and Soane Lilo Foliaki.

== Notable alumni ==
- Cardinal Soane Patita Paini Mafi – Member of the College of Cardinals & head of the Catholic Church in Tonga and Niue
- Bishop Patelisio Punou-Ki-Hihifo Finau – Former head of the Catholic Church in Tonga and Niue
- Bishop Soane Lilo Foliaki – Former head of the Catholic Church in Tonga and Niue
- Sir Sofele Kakala – Knight of the Order of St Gregory the Great
- Lord Sevele of Vailahi – Former Prime Minister of Tonga
- Lita Foliaki Edwards – Honorary Member of the New Zealand Order of Merit
- 'Alisi Afeaki Taumoepeau – First Tongan woman to become a Government Minister
- Vaea Naufahu 'Anitoni – US Rugby Hall of Fame inductee
- Manakaetau 'Otai – Former Captain & Coach of ‘Ikale Tahi
- Shannon Frizell – New Zealand All Blacks blindside flanker
