= Basilica of St. Anthony of Padua, Tonga =

Catholic church building in Tonga

Basilica of St. Anthony of Padua
- Basilica of St. Anthony of Padua
- 21°8′12″S 175°12′7″W
- Location: Nukualofa
- Country: Tonga
- Denomination: Catholic Church

The Basilica of St. Anthony of Padua or simply Church of St. Anthony of Padua, is a Catholic church in the Taufa'ahau road in the town of Nukualofa, the capital of the Kingdom of Tonga in the Pacific Ocean.

== Description ==
This is one of the country's most important Catholic churches, and the other being the main Cathedral of St. Mary in the same city. The basilica on the Diocese of Tonga. The current structure near the royal tombs was built by volunteers starting in 1977 and completed in 1980. Pope John Paul II granted the title of basilica.

== See also ==
- Catholic Church in Tonga
- Basilica of St. Anthony of Padua
