= Feleti Sevele =

Prime Minister of Tonga from 2006 to 2010

The Honourable Lord Sevele of Vailahi
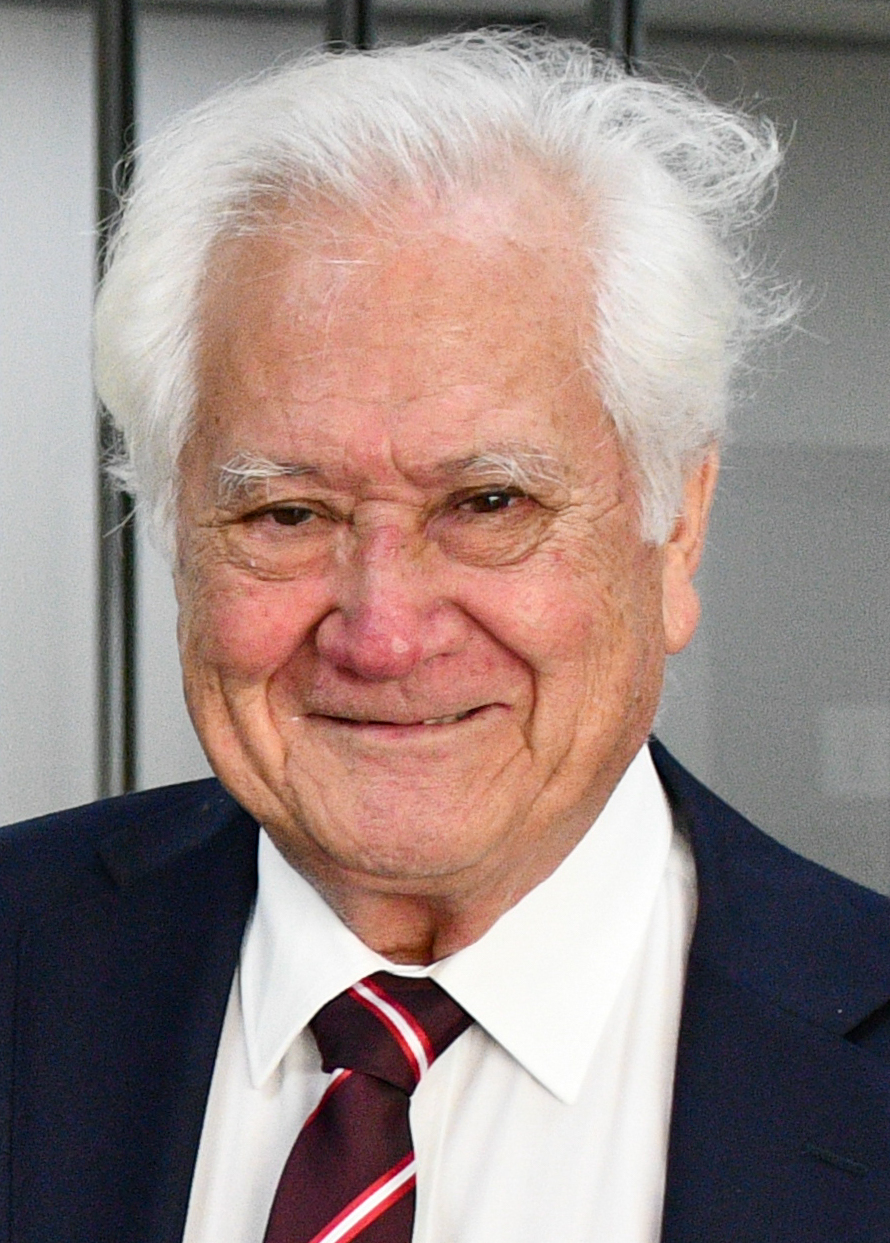
- Lord Sevele in 2023

Prime Minister of Tonga
- In office 30 March 2006 – 22 December 2010; Acting: 11 February 2006 – 30 March 2006
- Monarchs: Tāufaʻāhau Tupou IV; George Tupou V
- Deputy: Viliami Tangi
- Preceded by: ʻAhoʻeitu ʻUnuakiʻotonga Tukuʻaho
- Succeeded by: Sialeʻataongo Tuʻivakanō

Personal details
- Born: 7 July 1944 (age 82) Nukuʻalofa, Tonga
- Spouse: Ainise Sevele
- Children: Maliana, Frederick Stephen and Pisila
- Parent(s): Viliami Vaka'uta Sevele; Mele Yarnton
- Education: University of Canterbury

Feleti Vakaʻuta Sevele, Lord Sevele of Vailahi (born 7 July 1944) is a Tongan politician who served as the prime minister of Tonga from 30 March 2006 to 22 December 2010.

== Biography ==
=== Early life ===
Lord Sevele was born in Maʻufanga, Nukuʻalofa. He began his high school education at Apifoʻou College in Tonga, then went to school in Fiji at St John's College in Levuka on the island of Ovalau, and the Marist Brothers High School, Suva. He then attended St Bede's College in Christchurch, New Zealand, before going to the University of Canterbury where he graduated with a BSc degree in mathematics, and a BA, an MA and a PhD degree in economic geography titled 'Regional inequalities in socio-economic development in Tonga' . He was awarded an honorary doctorate in 2003.

=== Career ===
Upon returning to Tonga he was employed by the Tonga Commodities Board, then as chief economist for the South Pacific Commission, and as a councillor for the University of the South Pacific. He subsequently worked as Director of Catholic Education, a consultant, and businessman.

Sevele was first elected as one of nine People's Representatives to the Legislative Assembly (Fale Alea) in the 1999 election and re-elected in subsequent elections. In March 2005 he was appointed to the Cabinet as Minister for Labour, Commerce and Industries, becoming one of the first two elected representatives to be appointed to Cabinet. In this capacity, he negotiated Tonga's becoming a member of the World Trade Organization in December 2005. In early 2006 he presented an Employment Relations Bill to Cabinet, based on the Fijian bill of the same name, as a response to the public service strike of 2005.

== Prime minister ==
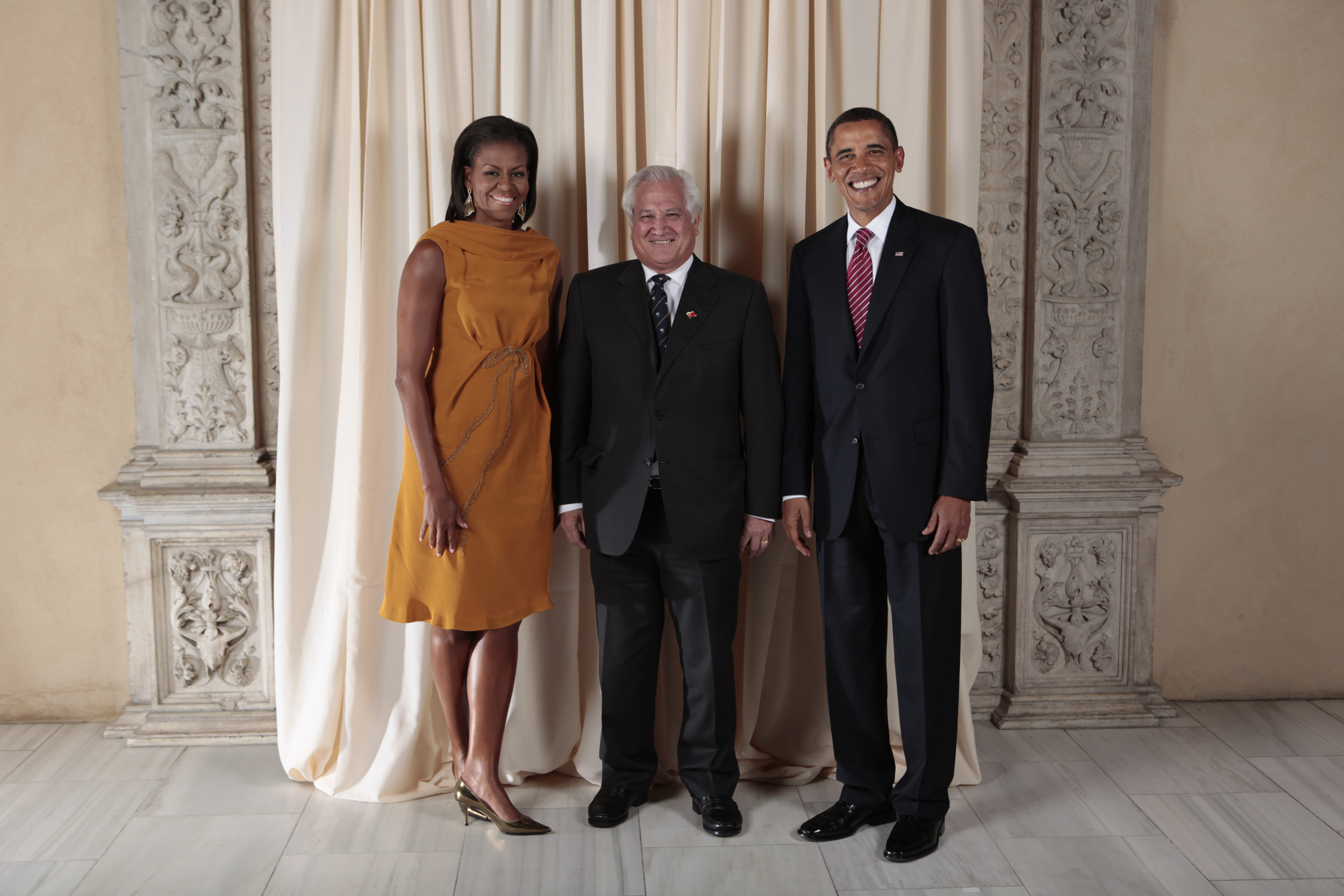
Feleti Sevele with US president Barack Obama and First Lady Michelle Obama in September 2009

Sevele was appointed acting prime minister after the sudden resignation of Prince ʻUlukālala Lavaka Ata on 11 February 2006, six months after the series of strikes calling for a lesser role in government for the royal family. Sevele's role was made permanent by King Tāufaʻāhau Tupou IV on 30 March 2006. He is the country's third non-noble Prime Minister after Shirley Waldemar Baker and Siosateki Tonga.

On 19 September 2007, Sevele was received by Philippine President Gloria Macapagal Arroyo in Malacañang, while he was in the country to attend the Asian Development Bank's "Mobilizing Aid for Trade" conference (18 to 20 September).

Following the resignation of Finance Minister Siosiua ʻUtoikamanu, Sevele temporarily took over his portfolio on 26 February 2008 until Afuʻalo Matoto was appointed as Finance Minister on 20 March.

Sevele did not seek re-election at the 2010 elections. Following the completion of his term as prime minister, he was created a Tongan life peer by King George Tupou V with the noble title of Lord Sevele of Vailahi.

== Honours ==
National honours

- Order of Queen Sālote Tupou III, Knight Grand Cross with collar (31 July 2008).

Political offices
Preceded by ʻAhoʻeitu ʻUnuakiʻotonga Tukuʻaho	Prime Minister of Tonga; 2006–2010	Succeeded by Sialeʻataongo Tuʻivakanō
