= Soakimi Gatafahefa =

First Polynesian Catholic priest (1838–1896)

Soakimi Gatafahefa (1838 – 24 May 1896), also known as simply Soakimi Gata, a Polynesian transliteration of Joachim Gata, was the first Roman Catholic priest from Polynesia. He worked in several Oceanic countries including Tonga, Samoa, Fiji, Wallis and Futuna, and later Australia and New Zealand.

== Biography ==
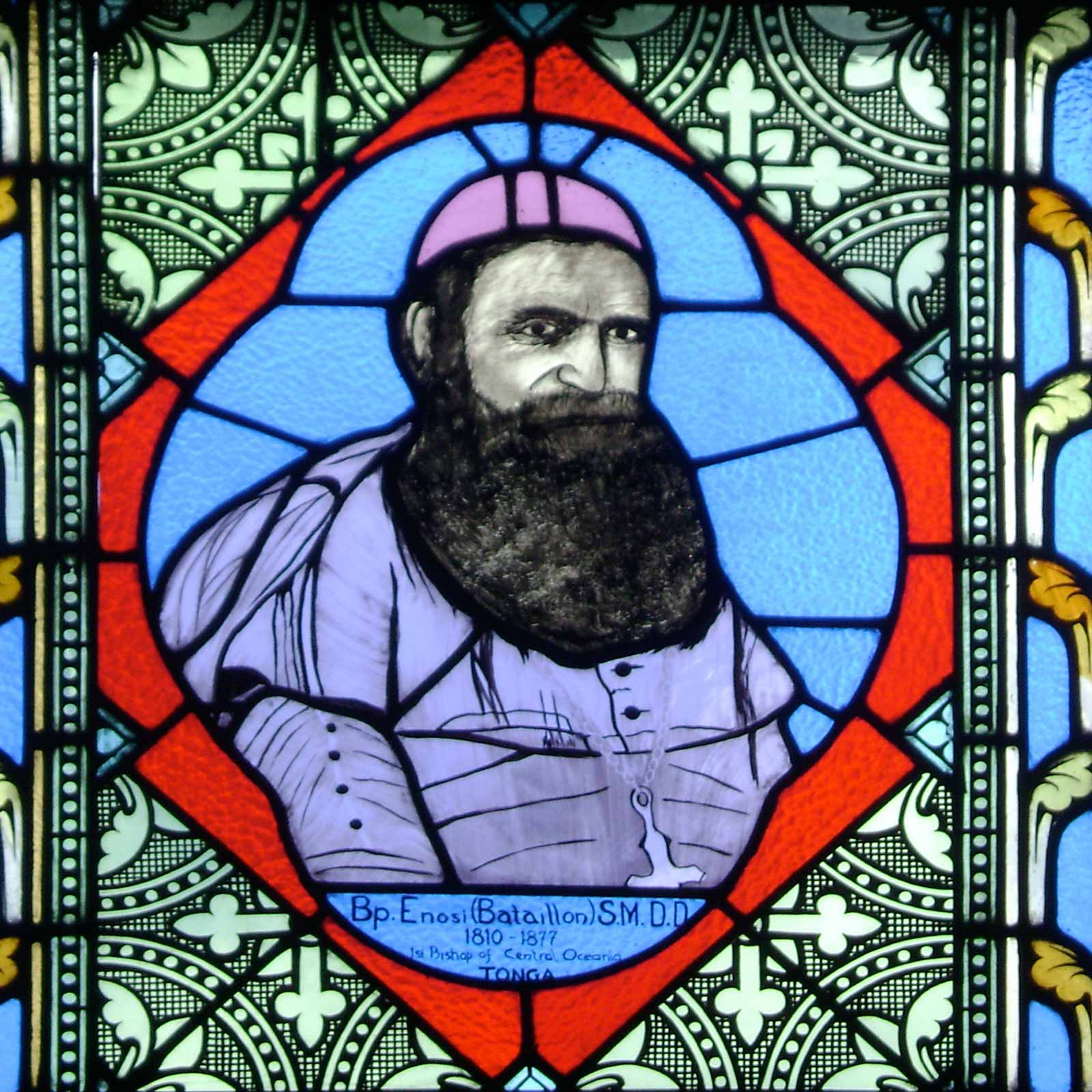
Bishop Pierre Bataillon, Vicar Apostolic of Central Oceania

Gatafahefa was born on Lakeba in the Lau Islands, Fiji, the son of Tongan parents. From the island of Tongatapu, his family were relatives of Tāufaʻāhau, the later Tongan King George Tupou I. Gatafahefa converted to Roman Catholicism with his father. Baptised as Soakimi or Joachim, he spent most of his formative years on Futuna. He entered the school at Kolopelu, on Futuna, and then the Seminary of Lano, on Wallis, founded by the French Marist missionary priest, Bishop Pierre Bataillon, the Vicar Apostolic of Central Oceania.

Recognising his potential, Bishop Bataillon took Gatafahefa with him to Sydney, New South Wales, for further education. In 1856, he took him to Europe along with two other Polynesian students: a Rotuman named Rafaele and a Wallisian named Motesito. They visited France and Rome, Italy, where Gatafahefa met Pope Pius IX. Staying in Rome, the three students attended the Propaganda College and studied to become priests. He was the only one of the Polynesian students to finish his studies and was ordained to the priesthood by Cardinal Costantino Patrizi Naro on 10 June 1865 at the Archbasilica of St. John Lateran. Thus he became the first Polynesian to be ordained a priest. Despite his training in Europe, his later appointments in Tonga, Samoa, Wallis and Futuna were met with controversy. Encyclopaedic sources claim that Bishop Bataillon believed that Gatafahefa was attempting to persuade the people of Futuna to distance themselves from European Roman Catholic clergymen.

After these incidents, Gatafahefa was sent for retraining in Sydney and New Caledonia. Archbishop Redwood accepted him into the Archdiocese of Wellington as long as no mention was made of his past. So he subsequently lived and worked for twenty years in New Zealand most of them as a lay brother at the Marist Mission Station and later Seminary in Meeanee, where he was known as "Brother Joe." He died on 24 May 1896, at the age of 58, and was buried in the Taradale Cemetery, Napier, Hawke's Bay; the name "Father Joachim Gata Gatafahefa" is now inscribed on his gravestone. After his death, although other Polynesians entered the priesthoods, no indigenous Tongans were ordained as Catholic clergymen until 1925.

== Bibliography ==
- Angleveil, Frederic (2007). "The first Oceanian priest, Soakimi Gata". Marist Messenger. April and May.
- Lal, Brij V.; Fortune, Kate (2000). The Pacific Islands: An Encyclopedia. Honolulu: University of Hawaii Press. ISBN 978-0-8248-2265-1.
- Lange, Raeburn (2006). Island Ministers: Indigenous Leadership in Nineteenth Century Pacific Islands Christianity (PDF). Christchurch, New Zealand: Macmillan Brown Centre for Pacific Studies, University of Canterbury. ISBN 978-1-74076-176-5.
- Munro, Doug; Thornley, Andrew, eds. (1996). The Covenant Makers: Islander Missionaries in the Pacific. Suva, Fiji: Pacific Theological College and The Institute of Pacific Studies at the University of the South Pacific. ISBN 978-982-02-0126-2.
- Revue du Monde Catholique. Vol. XVII. Paris: Librairie Victor Palmé. 1867.
