= Apostolic Vicariate of Central Oceania =

Catholic missionary jurisdiction

The Vicariate Apostolic of Central Oceania was a Catholic missionary jurisdiction in the Southern Pacific.

== History ==
The whole of Oceania had at first been entrusted by the Roman Congregation for the missions, Propaganda Fide, to the Society of the Sacred Hearts of Jesus and Mary (1825); but the territory proving too large, the western portion was afterwards formed into an Apostolic vicariate and given to the Society of Mary (1836), Jean Baptiste Pompallier being appointed first ordinary of the Apostolic Vicariate of Western Oceania.

In 1842, the Propaganda Fide created an Apostolic Vicariate of Central Oceania, including New Caledonia, Tonga, Samoa and Fiji Islands. On 23 July 1847, it lost territory to establish the Apostolic Vicariate of New Caledonia, on 20 August 1850 again to the newly established Apostolic Vicariate of Archipelago of the Navigators and 27 March 1863 to the newly established Apostolic Prefecture of Fiji Island. After these subdivisions, the vicariate included only the Tonga, the Wallis Islands, Futuna and Niue. The Tonga Islands extend from 15° to 22° S. lat. and from 173° to 176° W. long. Niue is three hundred miles to the east. The Wallis Islands lie in 13° S. lat. and 178° W. long.; Futuna, in 40° 14' S. lat. and 179° 33' W. long. These archipelagos were divided among several more or less constitutional monarchies; the Kingdoms of Tonga, Niue, Wallis and the two Kingdoms of Futuna. Tonga and Niue were under British protectorate, Wallis and Futuna, under French.

By the early 20th century, freedom of worship was theoretically recognized everywhere except in Niue, which was exclusively Protestant; Wallis and Futuna were entirely Catholic. In Tonga, there were Catholics, Methodists belonging to the Sydney conference, independent Methodists forming a national Church, some Anglicans, Adventists and Mormons. The total population was 34,000, with 9200 Catholics.

In the early 20th century, there were 35 Catholic churches; 21 European and 1 native Marist priests, and 3 native secular priests; 28 schools with 2039 children; 2 colleges; 1 seminary. The establishments for girls were under the care of 52 Sisters of the Third Order of Mary. The boys' schools were conducted by native lay teachers; the colleges and the seminary by priests. The islands were divided into districts, with resident missionaries assembling every month for an ecclesiastical conference. There were annual retreats for the priests, for the sisters and for the catechists, besides general retreats for the faithful about every two years. In each village there was a sodality of men (Kan Apositolo) and another of women (Fakafeao). The yearly number of baptisms averaged 310; of marriages, 105. The vicariate has given to the Church the proto-martyr of Oceania, Blessed P. Chanel.

== Legacy ==
After having lost more territory to establish the Apostolic Vicariate of Wallis and Futuna on 1935.11.11, by now being reduced to a tiny part of its original expanse, it was on 13 April renamed as Apostolic Vicariate of Tonga Islands, on 22 March 1957 again renamed as Apostolic Vicariate of Tonga Islands and Niue, which would on 21 June 1966 be promoted as the Diocese of Tonga, yet remains exempt, i.e. directly subject to the Holy See.

== List of incumbent ordinaries ==
All were titular bishops and members of the same missionary congregation, the Marists (S.M.)

Vicars Apostolic of Central Oceania

- Pierre Bataillon, S.M. (1842.11.22 – 1863)
- Aloys Elloy, S.M. (1872 – 1878.11.22)
- Jean-Amand Lamaze, S.M. (1879.05.09 – 1906.09.09)
- Armand Olier, S.M. (1906.09.09 – 1911.09.17)
- Joseph Felix Blanc, S.M. (1912.02.17 – 1937.04.13), who went on as first Apostolic Vicar of Tonga Islands (1937.04.13 – 1952)

== Sources and external links ==
- GigaCatholic with incumbent ordinaries list and biography links
