= Diocese of Australia and New Zealand =

Diocese of Australia and New Zealand may refer to:

- Serbian Orthodox Eparchy of Australia and New Zealand
- Macedonian Orthodox Diocese of Australia and New Zealand
- Russian Orthodox Diocese of Sydney, Australia and New Zealand

== See also ==
- List of Catholic dioceses in Oceania
