= St. Mary's Cathedral, Tonga =

Religious building located in the Kingdom of Tonga

Coordinates: 21°08′27″S 175°10′54″W

Saint Mary's Cathedral
- Cathedral of St. Mary; Cathedral of Nukualofa; Cathedral of the Immaculate Conception
- St Mary's Cathedral, Tonga
- Saint Mary's Cathedral
- Country: Tonga
- Denomination: Catholic

Administration
- Diocese: Tonga

Clergy
- Bishop: Most Rev. Soane Patita Paini Mafi

St Mary's Cathedral, Tonga

The Cathedral of St. Mary (or simply Cathedral of Nukualofa and also alternately called the Cathedral of the Immaculate Conception and locally in Tongan: Malia Tupu Imakulata) is a religious building located on Vuna Road in the town of Nukualofa, capital of the Kingdom of Tonga a small independent state in Oceania. It should not be confused with the Basilica of Saint Anthony of Padua also located in the same city.

The church follows the Roman or Latin rite and serves as the seat of the diocese of Tonga (Latin: Dioecesis Tongana) which was created in 1966 by bull "Prophetarum voices" of Pope Paul VI. It is under the pastoral responsibility of Cardinal Soane Patita Paini Mafi.
