= Armand Olier =

French clergyman

Armand Olier S.M.
- Vicar Apostolic of Central Oceania
- Church: Catholic Church
- See: Vicariate Apostolic of Central Oceania
- In office: 9 September 1906 – 17 September 1911
- Predecessor: Jean-Amand Lamaze
- Successor: Joseph-Félix Blanc
- Previous posts: Titular Bishop of Tipasa in Mauretania (1903-1911); Coadjutor Vicar Apostolic of Central Oceania(1903-1906)

Orders
- Ordination: 8 August 1880
- Consecration: 17 April 1904 by Francis Moran

Personal details
- Born: 6 May 1851 Montjaux, France
- Died: 17 September 1911 (aged 60) Moafaga, Tonga

Armand Olier (1851 – 17 September 1911) was a French clergyman and bishop for the Roman Catholic Diocese of Tonga. He was in Marzials and appointed bishop in 1903. He died in 1911 in Moafaga, Tonga.
