= Siaosi Tukuʻaho =

Prime Minister of Tonga from 1890 to 1893

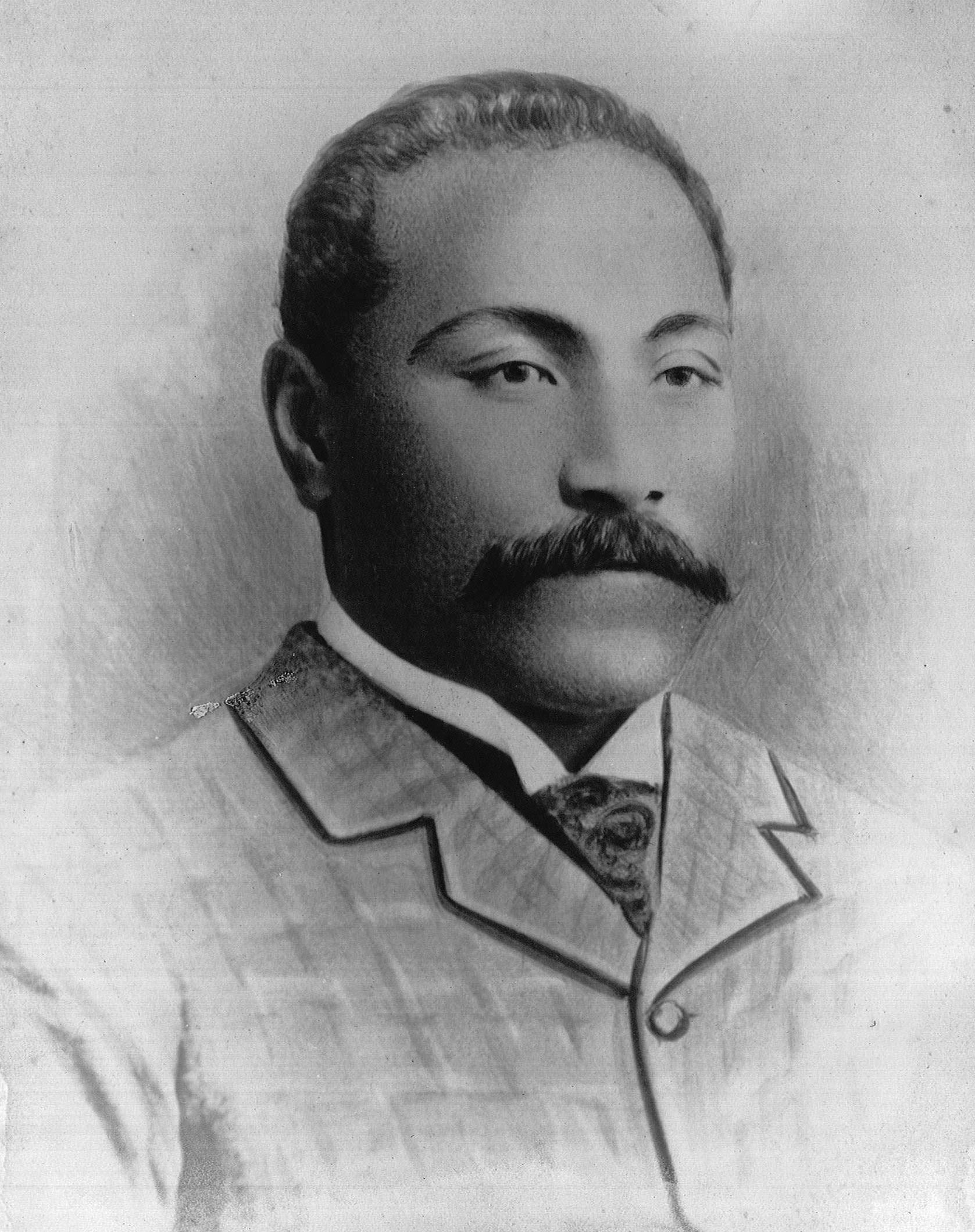

Prime Minister of Tonga
- In office July 1890 – 1893
- Monarch: George Tupou I
- Preceded by: Shirley Waldemar Baker
- Succeeded by: Siosateki Tonga

Personal details
- Children: Viliami Tungī Mailefihi

Siaosi Tukuʻaho was a politician from Tonga who served as Prime Minister of Tonga from July 1890 to 1893.
