= Sioeli Nau =

Tongan missionary (1825–1895)

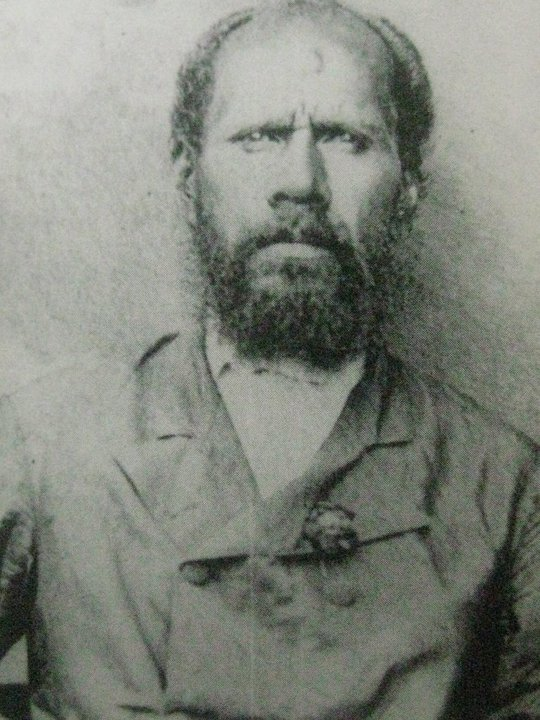
- Born: 1825; Tonga
- Died: 1895 (aged 69–70)
- Occupation: Methodist Minister
- Title: Sioeli Nau
- Spouse: ʻAkosita Tuikadavu
- Children: Tevita Kata Nau II; Semisi Nau 'Apisai Nau; Hosea Nau 'Alifaleti Nau; Pita Nau; Lu'isa Nau; Filipe Mahe Nau; Mafi Nau
- Parents: Filipe 'Onevela (father); Lu'isa Lauaki (mother)

Sioeli Nau (1825 – 1895), also known as Joel Nau, was a Tongan Methodist minister. He was the son of Lu'isa Ma'ukakalafo'ou Lauaki and Filipe 'Onevela. He was also the grandson of Matapule Lauaki the Nima Tapu.

== Origin of his name ==
His real surname was "‘Onevela"; he got his surname when he and his family turned from worshipping idol gods and "Now" to worshipping the Christian God. English word "Now" is the Tongan translation name of "Nau." His English name for "Sioeli" is "Joel".

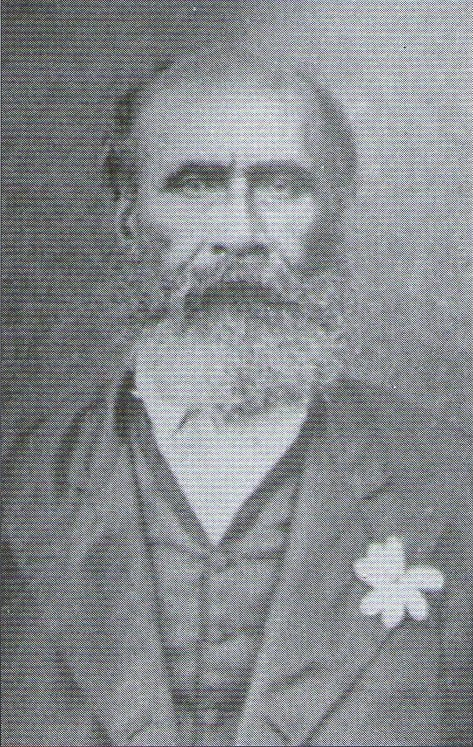
Filipe 'Onevela: Father of Sioeli Nau

== Family background ==
Sioeli Nau was the youngest of six children. His father was from Masilamea, Neiafu, Vava'u in Tonga. He had five older brothers: Tama Watson Nau, Paula Fuikefu Nau, Tevita Kata Nau I, Simione Nau and 'Aisea Nau. His mother was the oldest daughter and first child of Matapule Lauaki the Royal Undertaker.

Matapule Lauaki had a second daughter called Pe'emoana Lauaki. Through her daughter, Hepisipa, she became the ancestor of the powerful aristocratic noble in Vava'u, Hon. Lord Finau ʻUlukalala V (Misini). The line continued through Hon. Lord Ve'ehala (Toluhama'a Tungi Vi) since his maternal grandfather was Hon. Lord Finau ʻUlukalala VI (Ha'amea).

== Beginning of his ministry ==
He was a Tongan Methodist minister who worked in Vava'u and Ha'apai in 1850. About this same year, Rev Sioeli Pulu arrived to Tonga from Fiji asking King George Tupou I for more missionaries and teachers. In 1856, Sioeli Nau was selected to lead the missionary group. He, his wife and his son, along with other missionaries journeyed to the people of Bau Island, Fiji, the relatives of the Fijian chief Tui Bau Cakobau. During this time he worked together with Rev Sioeli Pulu and established successful tasks in Bau Island. In 1861, his wife was infected with a serious illness and died. Not much is known about his son and his name is remained unknown even to this day.

From 1863 to 1875, he was stationed on Kadavu Island where he continued working as a missionary. He was urged by the missionaries to get married, he agreed and married a Fijian woman 'Akosita, daughter of Tuikadavu Chief of Kadavu Island. They had ten children. Four of them worked for the church, three of them as missionaries.

Sioeli Nau was for a time a tutor at the Fijian Methodist District Institution at Navuloa where, according to his obituary, "he was highly esteemed by all the Missionaries". He was stationed in Tonga, at the Island of 'Eua (1877–1878), Tu'anekivale on Vava'u (1879–1881), Angaha on the remote northern island of Niuafo'ou (1882–1884). He was listed as being stationed at Ha'ano Island in the Ha'apai Group in 1885, but it is unlikely that he took up this appointment. In 1886, he appears in the Methodist lists as a "supernumerary" and in 1887 as "under the direction of the Chairman of the District".

== Issue ==
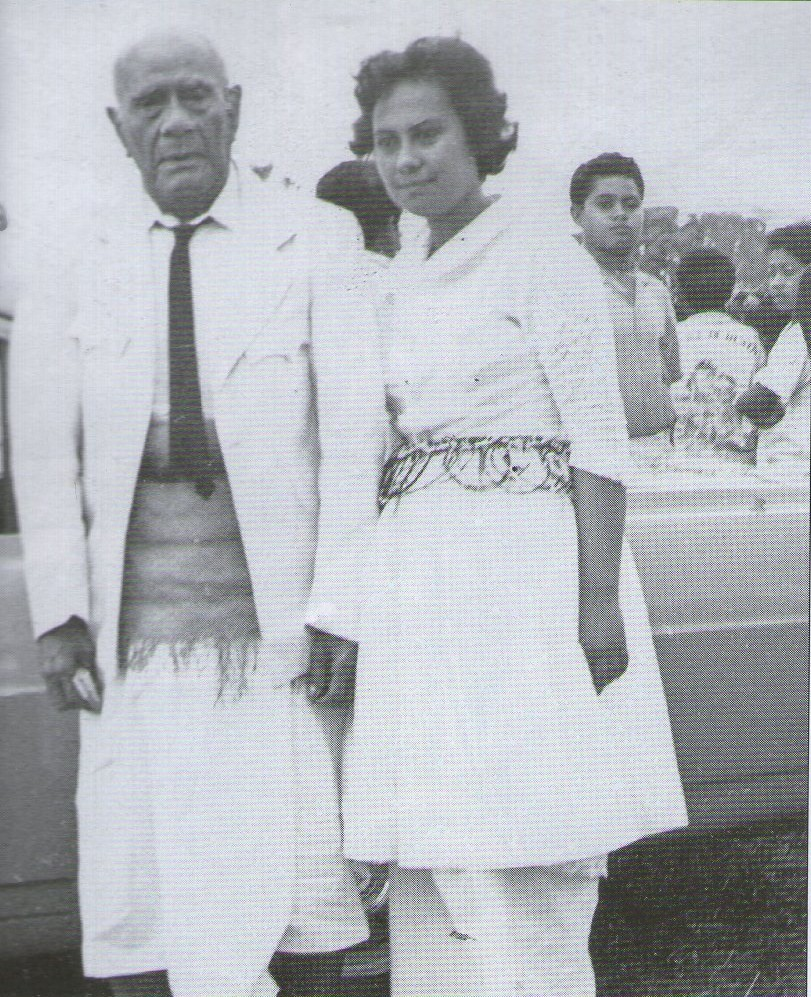
Pita Nau (son of Sioeli Nau) and Lesieli Galloway at the reunion of Tupou College in 1968

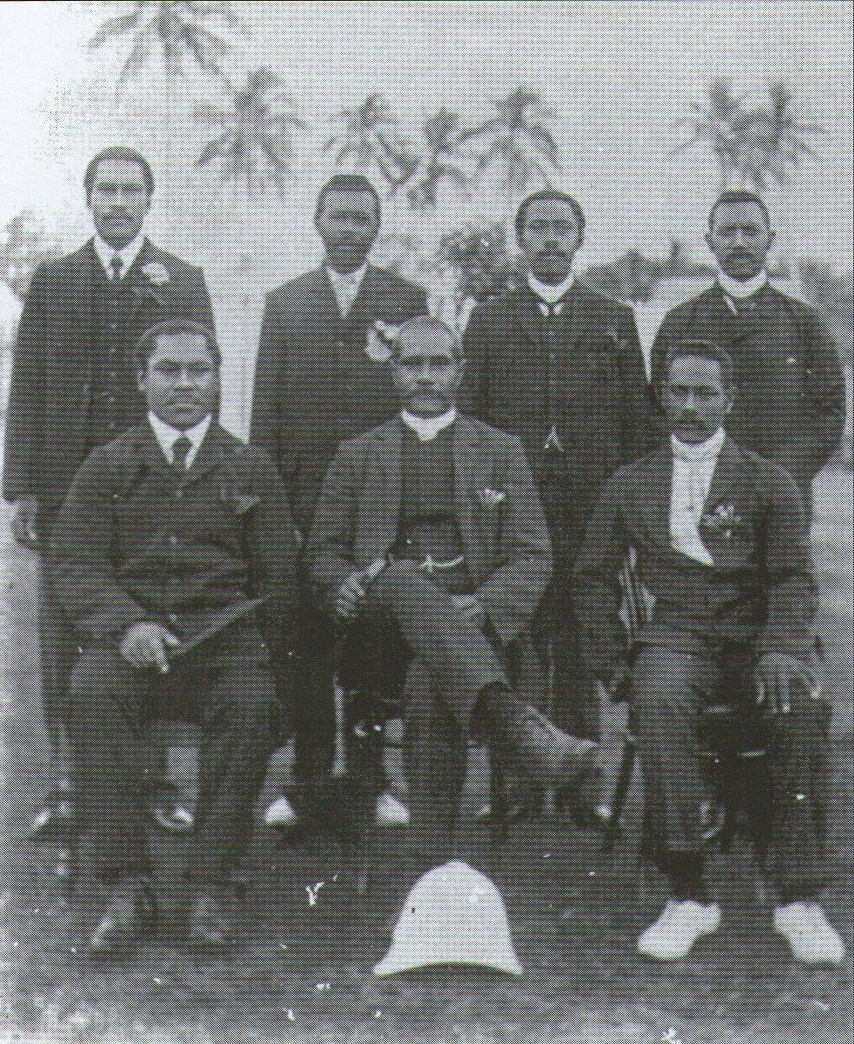
Former Students of Tupou College: Front Row (Left to Right); Prince Consort Viliami Tungī Mailefihi, Sione Havea and Lotima Palu. Back Row (Left to Right); 'Ikani Taliai, Tevita Kata Nau II, Suliasi Tolu and Lesinali Tovo

Name	Occupation	Marriage	Children
Tevita Kata Nau II	Rev Methodist Minister	Married Sela Mahe and had issue	Fangahau Nau; 'Ana Kata Nau; 'Oliva Nau; Lupe Nau
Semisi Nau	Rev Methodist Minister who worked as a missionary at the Solomon Islands	Matelita Fatumu Tuliakiono	'Akosita Nau; 'Ilisapesi Nau
‘Apisai Nau	Rev Methodist Minister who worked in Fiji	Married and had adopted issue	'Ana Lini Nau; Lisi Nau
Hosea Nau	Rev Methodist Minister	Unknown	
‘Alifaleti Nau	Aged Care Nurse for the elderly	Sela Tai Lelenoa	Finau Nau; Sioeli Nau; Lekaumoana Nau; Simipale Nau; 'Ana Pesi Nau; Saane Nau; 'Apisai Nau; Tupa Nau; Suluo'o Nau; Meleseini Nau
Pita Nau	Teacher who accompanied Semisi Nau at the Solomon Islands	Lile 'Iongi	'Eleni Nau; Sela Ma'ake Nau
Lu‘isa Nau	Unknown	Henele Ma'u	Fifita Ma'u; Fane Ma'u; Sikipio Ma'u; Taitusi Ma'u; Lopeti Ma'u; Tevita Ma'u
Filipe Mahe Nau	Unknown	Mele Tufui Fonua	Sela Nau; Sione Palu Nau; Oliveti Nau; Semisi Nau; Analiva Vasavasa Nau
Mafi Nau	Unknown	Married and had issue	

== Persecution ==
In 1885, before Sioeli Nau could leave Niuafo’ou, he was caught up in the division which resulted from the split between the Free Church of Tonga and the Wesleyan Mission. Those who refused to join the Free Church of Tonga were persecuted by Shirley Waldemar Baker with the help of the king George Tupou I. When this happened the majority of the people had left the Wesleyan mission and joined the Free Church. However, Sioeli remained loyal to Rev Dr James Egan Moulton and the minority Wesleyan Mission, (who were faithful to the Australasian Conference). He was brought to court standing before the magistrate and the people of the parliament. At this moment Sioeli Nau reflected the almost intolerable test of loyalty which Tongans were faced with.

The people were interrogated and asked individually:

(1) Do you love Tubou or Moulton?

(2) Whom will you worship with? Tubou or Mr Moulton?

The dilemma faced by Tongans was graphically described and spoken by Sioeli on behalf of the Wesleyans:

"It is our habit to obey our chiefs in all things. We cannot follow our own minds in anything. If our chiefs tell us to do this thing, and it is quite clear to us that it is wrong we must nevertheless do it. Numbers have gone over through fear alone. Their bodies have gone over - their souls are with our church…. I am like Esther, "If I perish, I perish". I shall not leave the Wesleyan Church. I remember my vows made in your presence the missionaries of God and in the presence of God, and in the presence of God I would do my duty in the Wesleyan Church unto my death - and by God's help I will follow this out".

He along with the Wesleyan group suffered persecution because they refused to join the Free Church of Tonga. He described how he was "accused of speaking against the king" and "of rebelling and persuading the people of the island to come over to my side". In August 1886 he was found guilty of libelling the king, sentenced to five years imprisonment and fined $100 with $50 costs. He was sentenced to further five years "for saying that the thing that the king wishes was wrong". Sioeli was transferred from prison in Tongatapu to Vava’u in January 1887 along with other Wesleyan prisoners where they "were at once ‘told off’ to join the pontoon gangs (procuring stone for building piles)".

== Life in exile ==
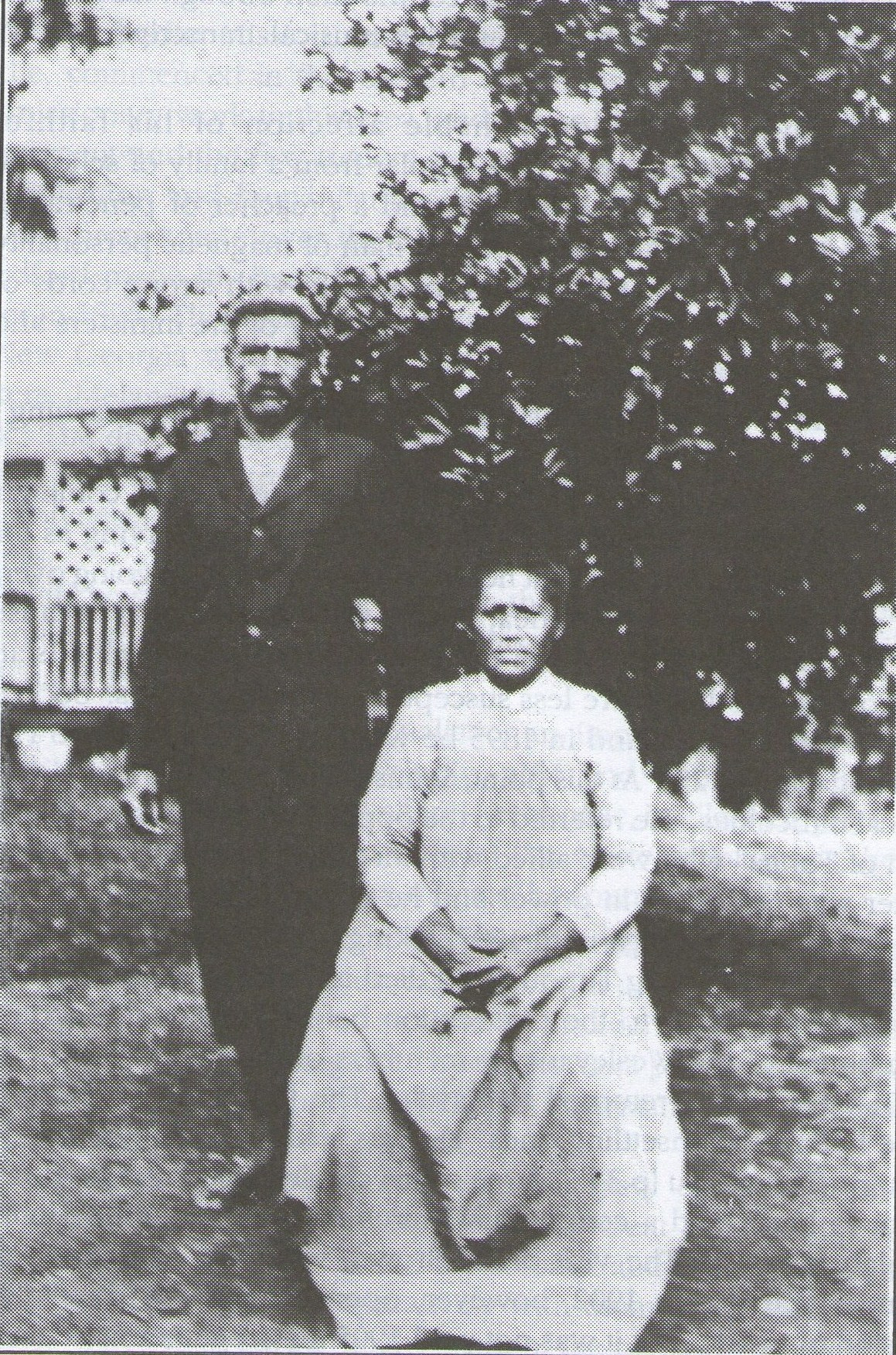
Sioeli Nau's son and daughter-in-law: Semisi Nau with his wife Matelita Fatumu Nau

Rev Dr James Egan Moulton appealed for the safe removal of the remaining Wesleyans and their children from Tonga. Sioeli was still in prison when Sir Charles Mitchell arrived on 27 March 1887, to investigate the troubles in Tonga. The inquiry was requested by the British government because of the considerable publicity which had been given in the Australasian and British press to the persecution of the Wesleyans. Mitchell conducted a thorough investigation although in his findings he steered a middle course between taking the side of either Baker and the King or Moulton and the Wesleyans. He decided against deporting Baker because of the valuable service he had rendered to the King. But he urged the King to grant "a general amnesty for acts done during the past disturbances", the release of all the political prisoners and the full restoration of "liberty to worship in accordance with conscience". Ten days later, Sioeli along with the Wesleyan prisoners were released under this amnesty and went with other exiles to Fiji.

Living in exile, he, his wife and children were among the 90 Tongan Wesleyans who resided on Koro Island, Fiji. He took charge of the Beqa section in the Rewa Circuit, where he worked "with considerable vigour". He was appointed to Naitasiri where he served from 1888 to 1890.

== Return ==
After the deportation of Shirley Waldemar Baker by John Bates Thurston from Tonga, on 17 July 1890, more than 130 Tongan exiles were allowed to return home. Sioeli was again reappointed to Tonga, taking an appointment again at Niuafo'ou (1891–1893) and then on Lifuka in the Ha'apai Group (1894–1895). Some of the returning Wesleyans initially experienced harassment and Sioeli was among them. Disturbances were reported at Niuafo'ou where "the chief cannot leave the Wesleyans alone, but has been acting very harshly…...The Wesleyan Minister Joel Nau - one of the late exiles - has not met with the best treatment." When Dr Moulton visited Niuafo’ou a year later, relationships were much more harmonious. The Free Church minister "with the best of taste and kindly feeling" invited "the Wesleyan minister and their people" to join them in the anniversary commemoration of a volcanic eruption, "and both parties mixed together most cordially and had a right happy time".

== Death ==
Sioeli Nau's death was a tragic one. He disappeared on 18 December 1895 supposedly having "walked in his sleep to the rocks at the back of the island" and "been drawn under the surf". In his obituary, it is recorded that:

"His piety was deep and fervent, and his sermons powerful, and full of the unction of the Holy One; so he made many converts. He was one of the heartiest and most genial of men, it used to be said that his laugh shook the town….He had been 35 years a minister, and was about 70 years of age."
