= Francis Moran (cardinal) =

Catholic cardinal (1830–1911)

His Eminence Patrick Francis Moran
- Cardinal, Archbishop of Sydney
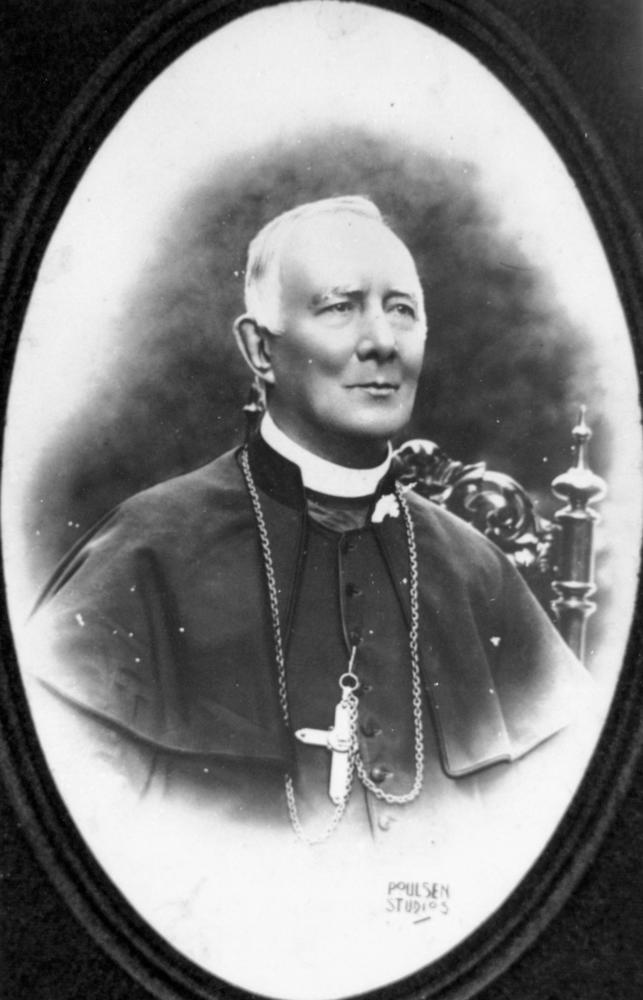
- Portrait of Cardinal Moran taken in Brisbane, Queensland, c. 1900
- Archdiocese: Sydney
- Installed: 1884
- Term ended: 1911
- Predecessor: Roger Vaughan
- Successor: Michael Kelly
- Other posts: Bishop of Ossory (1872–1884); Cardinal-priest of Santa Susanna (1885-1911)

Orders
- Ordination: 19 March 1853
- Consecration: 5 March 1872
- Created cardinal: 27 July 1885 by Leo XIII
- Rank: Cardinal-priest

Personal details
- Born: 16 September 1830 Leighlinbridge, County Carlow, Ireland
- Died: 16 August 1911 (aged 80) Sydney, Australia
- Buried: St. Mary's Cathedral, Sydney
- Denomination: Roman Catholic Church
- Parents: Patrick Moran; Alicia Mary Cullen
- Education: Irish College, Rome
- Coat of arms

Patrick Francis Moran (16 September 1830 – 16 August 1911) was a prelate of the Catholic Church and the third Archbishop of Sydney and the first cardinal appointed from Australia.

== Early life ==
Moran was born at Leighlinbridge, County Carlow, Ireland, on 16 September 1830. His parents were Patrick and Alicia Cullen Moran. Of his three sisters, two became nuns, one of whom died nursing cholera patients. His parents died by the time he was 11 years old. In 1842, at the age of twelve, he left Ireland in the company of his uncle, Paul Cullen, rector of the Irish College in Rome. There Moran studied for the priesthood, first at the minor seminary and then at the major seminary.

Moran was considered so intellectually bright that he gained his doctorate by acclamation. By twenty-five he spoke ten languages, ancient and modern. He focused on finding and editing important documents and manuscripts related to Irish ecclesiastical history. Some editions of his works remain important source materials to this day.

He was appointed vice-rector at the Irish College and also took the chair of Hebrew at Propaganda Fide. He was also some-time vice-rector of the Scots College in Rome. In 1866 Moran was appointed secretary to his mother's half-brother, Cardinal Paul Cullen of Dublin. Moran was also appointed professor of scripture at Clonliffe College, Dublin. He founded the "Irish Ecclesiastical Record" (on which he later modelled the "Australasian Catholic Record").

In 1869 he accompanied Cardinal Cullen to the First Vatican Council, a council also attended by Melbourne's then-first archbishop, James Alipius Goold. According to Michael Daniel, it is generally agreed that the definition of the Catholic doctrine of papal infallibility was based on Cullen's proposal, and Ayres suggests that there is strong evidence that Cullen's proposal was largely drafted by Moran. While in Rome and Ireland he was very active politically in opposing English Benedictine plans for monastic foundations undergirding the Catholic Church in Australia.

== Bishop of Ossory ==
Moran was appointed coadjutor bishop of Ossory on 22 December 1871 and was consecrated on 5 March 1872 in Dublin by his uncle, Paul Cardinal Cullen. On the death of Bishop Edward Walsh, he succeeded as Bishop of Ossory on 11 August 1872. He championed Home Rule and was consulted by W. E. Gladstone prior to the introduction of his Home Rule Bills.

== Cardinal ==
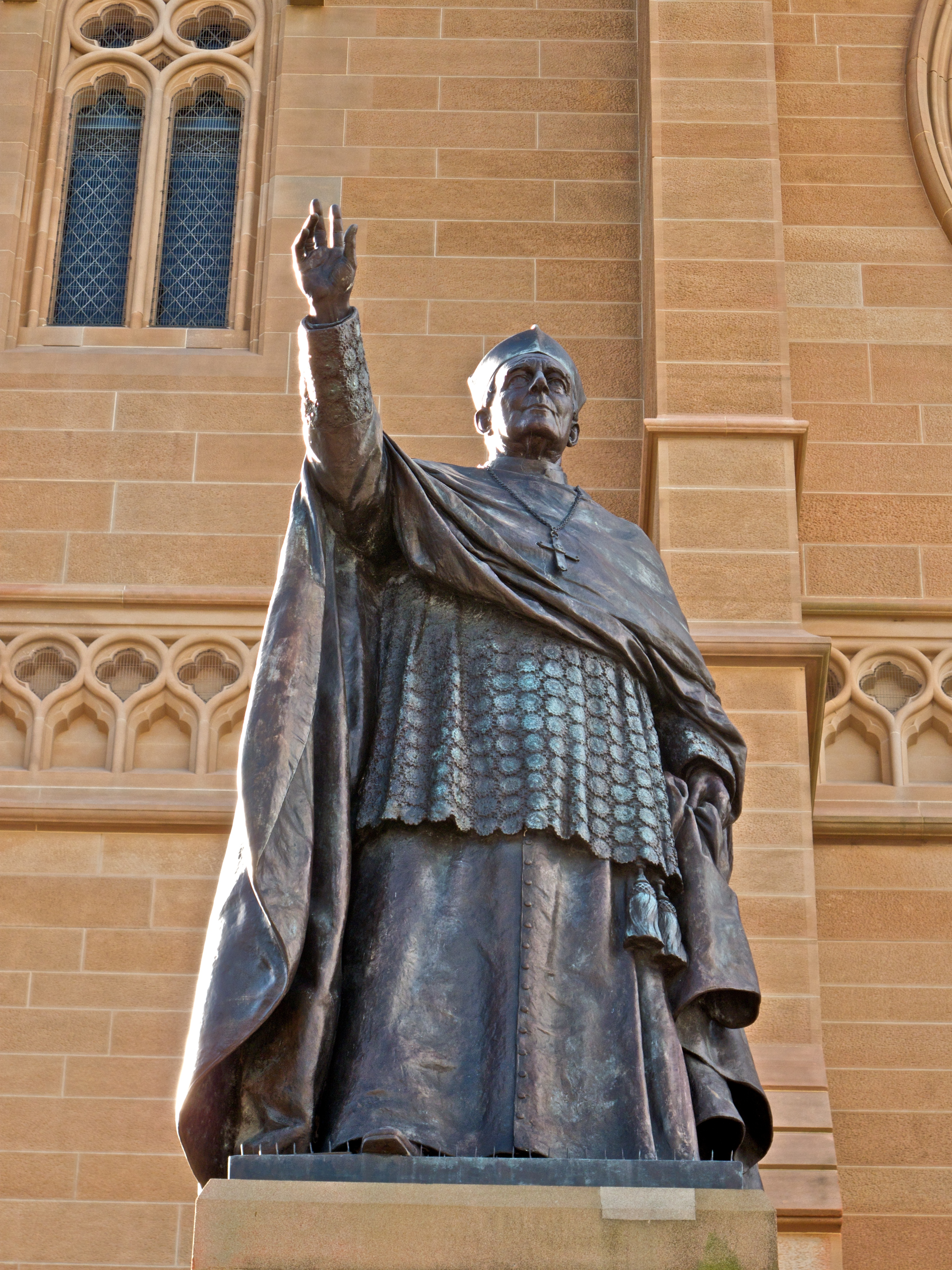
Statue of Moran at St Mary's Cathedral, Sydney

Moran was personally chosen and promoted by Pope Leo XIII to head the Archdiocese of Sydney – a clear policy departure from the previous English Benedictine incumbents (Polding and Vaughan) who were experiencing tension leading the predominantly Irish-Australian Catholics. In the archbishop's farewell audience with Leo XIII, it was evident that the intrigues of parties, the interference of government agencies and the influence of high ecclesiastics had made the matter almost impossible to decide by Propaganda. In the presence of others, the Pope said clearly: "We took the selection into our own hands. You are our personal appointment." Moran was appointed to Australia on 25 January 1884 and arrived on 8 September 1884. He was created cardinal-priest on 27 July 1885 with the title of St Susanna. The new Irish-Australian cardinal made it his business to make his presence and leadership felt.

Moran began transforming the Sydney St Patrick's Day festivities by inaugurating the celebration of a solemn High Mass at St Mary's Cathedral on St Patrick's Day 1885. Over time the day's events changed from an Irish nationalist and political day into an occasion "for the demonstration of Irish Catholic power and respectable assimilation" as well as "for the affirmation of Irish Catholic solidarity".

In the year 1886, it is estimated that Moran travelled 2,500 miles over land and sea, visiting all the dioceses of New Zealand. In 1887 he travelled 6,000 miles to consecrate fellow Irishman Matthew Gibney at Perth. He also travelled to Ballarat, Bathurst, Bendigo, Hobart, Goulburn, Lismore, Melbourne and Rockhampton for the consecration of their cathedrals. Following the 1891 encyclical Rerum Novarum, he supported the right of labourers to better their conditions.

During his episcopate, Moran consecrated 14 bishops (he was the principal consecrator of William Walsh, Michael Verdon, Patrick Vincent Dwyer, Armand Olier and also assisted in consecrating Patrick Clune, among others). He ordained nearly 500 priests, dedicated more than 5,000 churches and professed more than 500 nuns. He made five journeys to Rome on church business between 1885 and 1903, but did not participate in the papal conclave of 1903 because of the relatively short notice and the distance, making it impossible for him to reach Rome within 10 days of the death of Pope Leo.

Moran was a strong supporter of Federation, and in November 1896 attended the People's Federal Convention in Bathurst. In March 1897 Moran stood as a candidate election of ten delegates from New South Wales to the Australasian Federal Convention. Although he stated he would not attend the Convention in any official capacity, but in a solely individual one, his candidacy sparked a sectarian reaction. 29 per cent of voters gave one of their ten votes to Moran, but he came only thirteenth in number of total votes and was not elected.

From 1900 to 1901, Moran's leadership survived a crisis when his personal secretary, Denis O'Haran, was named as co-respondent in the divorce case of the cricketer Arthur Coningham. Moran vigorously defended O'Haran and a jury found in his favour.

Moran died in Manly, Sydney, in August 1911, aged 80. It was early in February 1911 that the late Cardinal Moran laid the foundation stone of the present cathedral in Armidale NSW. A quarter of a million people (the largest crowd ever to gather in Australia until that date) witnessed his funeral procession through the centre of Sydney. He is buried in St Mary's Cathedral, Sydney.

== Publications ==
- "Memoir of the Most Rev. Oliver Plunkett" (1861)
- "Essays on the Origin, etc., of the Early Irish Church" (1864)
- "History of the Catholic Archbishops of Dublin" (1864)
- "Historical Sketch of the Persecutions, etc., under Cromwell and the Puritans" (1866)
- "Acta S. Brendani" (1872)
- "Monasticon Hibernicum" 2 vols. by Mervyn Archdall, as editor (1873)
- "Spicilegium Ossoriense, being a Collection of Documents to illustrate the History of the Irish Church from the Reformation to the Year 1800" (3 vols., 4to, 1879)
- "Irish Saints in Great Britain" (1879)
- "a volume of poems entitled "Fragmentary Thoughts"
- "The Federal Government of Australasia,"
- "Letters on the Anglican Reformation" (1890).
- History of the Catholic Church in Australasia (1895), 2 volumes
- "St. Patrick", Catholic Encyclopedia (1911)

Catholic Church titles
Preceded by Edward Walsh	Bishop of Ossory; 1872–1884	Succeeded by Abraham Brownrigg
Preceded by Roger Bede Vaughan, O.S.B.	Archbishop of Sydney; 1884–1911	Succeeded by Michael Kelly
Preceded by Bartolomeo D'Avanzo	Cardinal-Priest of Santa Susanna; 1885–1911	Succeeded by François-Virgile Dubillard
