= Aloys Elloy =

Aloys Elloy S.M.
- Vicar Apostolic of Central Oceania
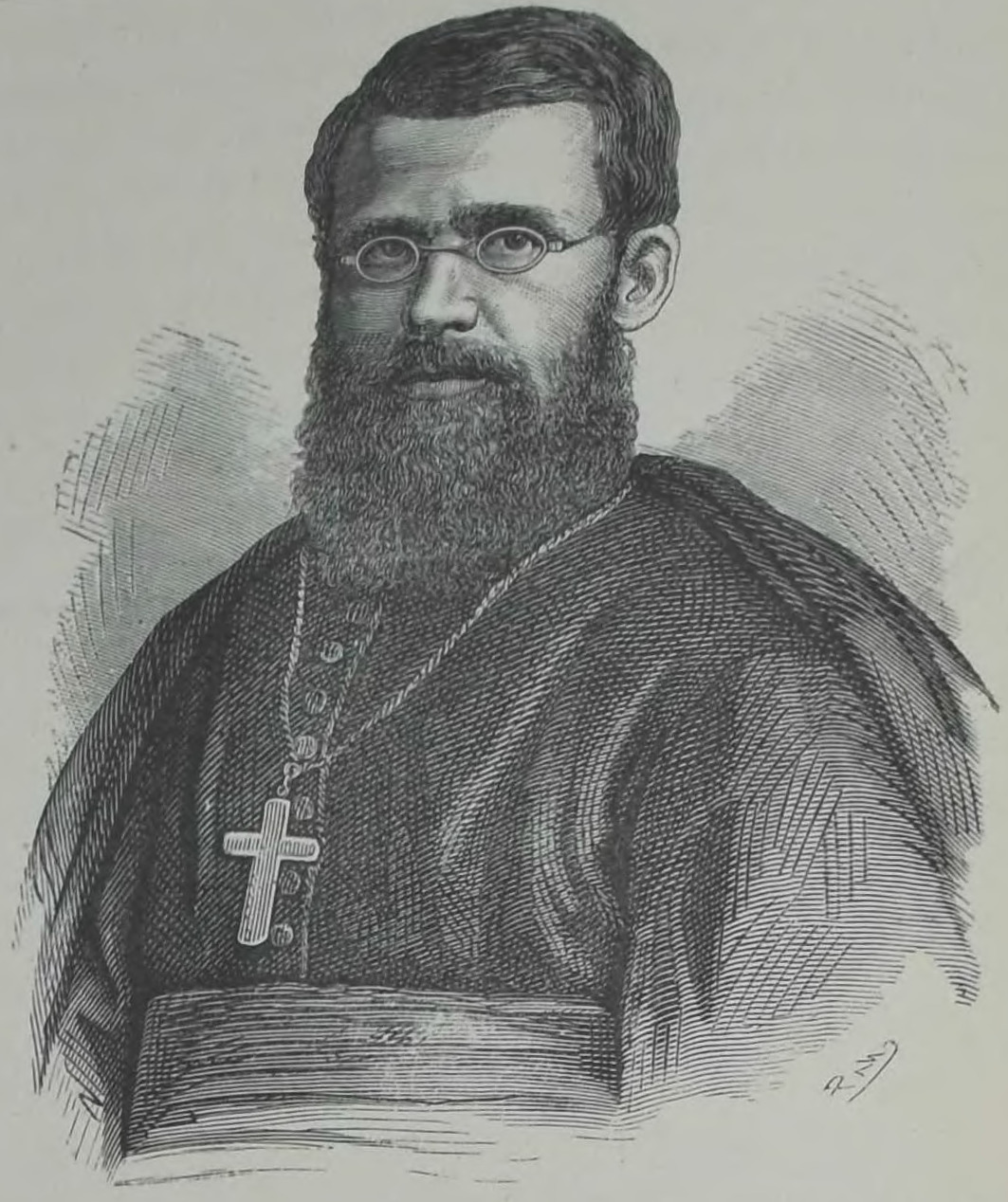
- Church: Catholic Church
- See: Vicariate Apostolic of Central Oceania
- In office: 11 April 1877 – 22 November 1878
- Predecessor: Pierre Bataillon
- Successor: Jean-Amand Lamaze
- Other posts: Apostolic Administrator of Archipelago of the Navigators (1870-1878); Titular Bishop of Tipasa in Mauretania (1863-1878)
- Previous post: Coadjutor Vicar Apostolic of Central Oceania (1863-1877)

Orders
- Ordination: 19 June 1853
- Consecration: 30 November 1864 by Pierre Bataillon

Personal details
- Born: 1829 Servigny-lès-Raville, Moselle, Kingdom of France
- Died: 22 November 1878 (aged 48–49)

Aloys Elloy (born 1829) was a French clergyman and bishop for the Roman Catholic Diocese of Tonga. He joined the Marist Fathers in 1852 and was sent as a missionary to Samoa. He was appointed bishop in 1863. He died in 1878.
