= Siosateki Tonga =

Prime Minister of Tonga from 1893 to 1905

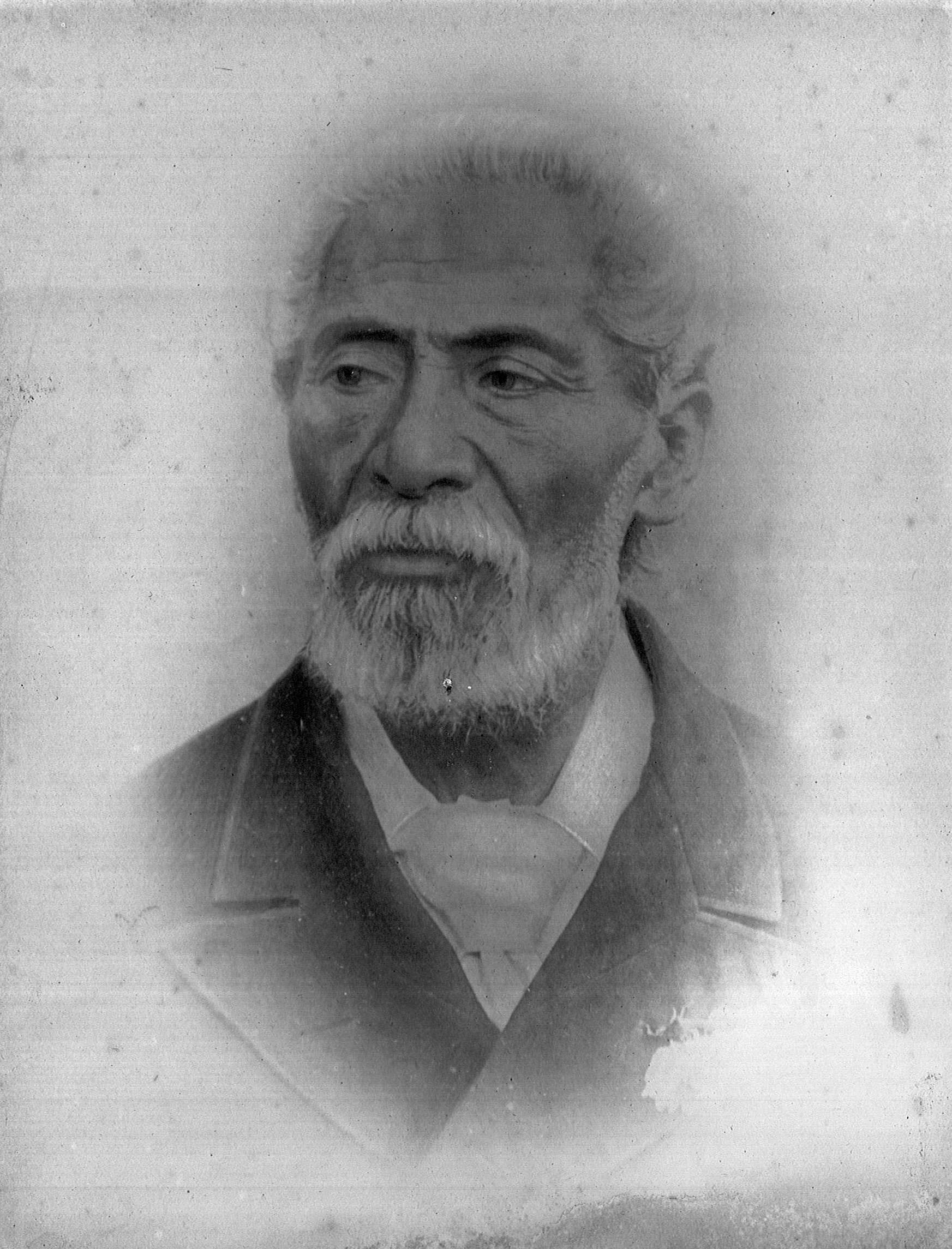

Prime Minister of Tonga
- In office 1893 – January 1905
- Monarch: George Tupou II
- Preceded by: Siaosi Tukuʻaho
- Succeeded by: Siaosi Tuʻipelehake

Personal details
- Born: 1853
- Died: 1913 (aged 59–60)
- Occupation: Politician

Siosateki Tonga was a politician from Tonga who served as 4th Prime Minister of Tonga from 1893 to January 1905. He was the first holder of the title Veikune which he got from George Tupou II in 1903.
