= Joseph-Félix Blanc =

French clergyman

Joseph-Félix Blanc S.M.
- Vicar Apostolic of Central Oceania/Tonga Islands
- Church: Catholic Church
- See: Vicariate Apostolic of Tonga Islands
- In office: 17 February 1912 – 1953
- Predecessor: Armand Olier
- Successor: John Rodgers
- Other post: Titular Bishop of Dibon (1912-1962)

Orders
- Ordination: 23 June 1895
- Consecration: 29 June 1912 by Francis Redwood

Personal details
- Born: 26 March 1872 Toulon, France
- Died: 8 June 1962 (aged 90) Tonga, United Kingdom

Joseph-Félix Blanc (1872 - June 1962) was a French clergyman and bishop for the Roman Catholic Diocese of Tonga. He was born in Toulon. He was appointed bishop in 1912. He retired as Bishop in 1953, and returned to France. He died in June 1962 in Tonga.
