= Shirley Waldemar Baker =

Prime Minister of Tonga from 1881 to 1890

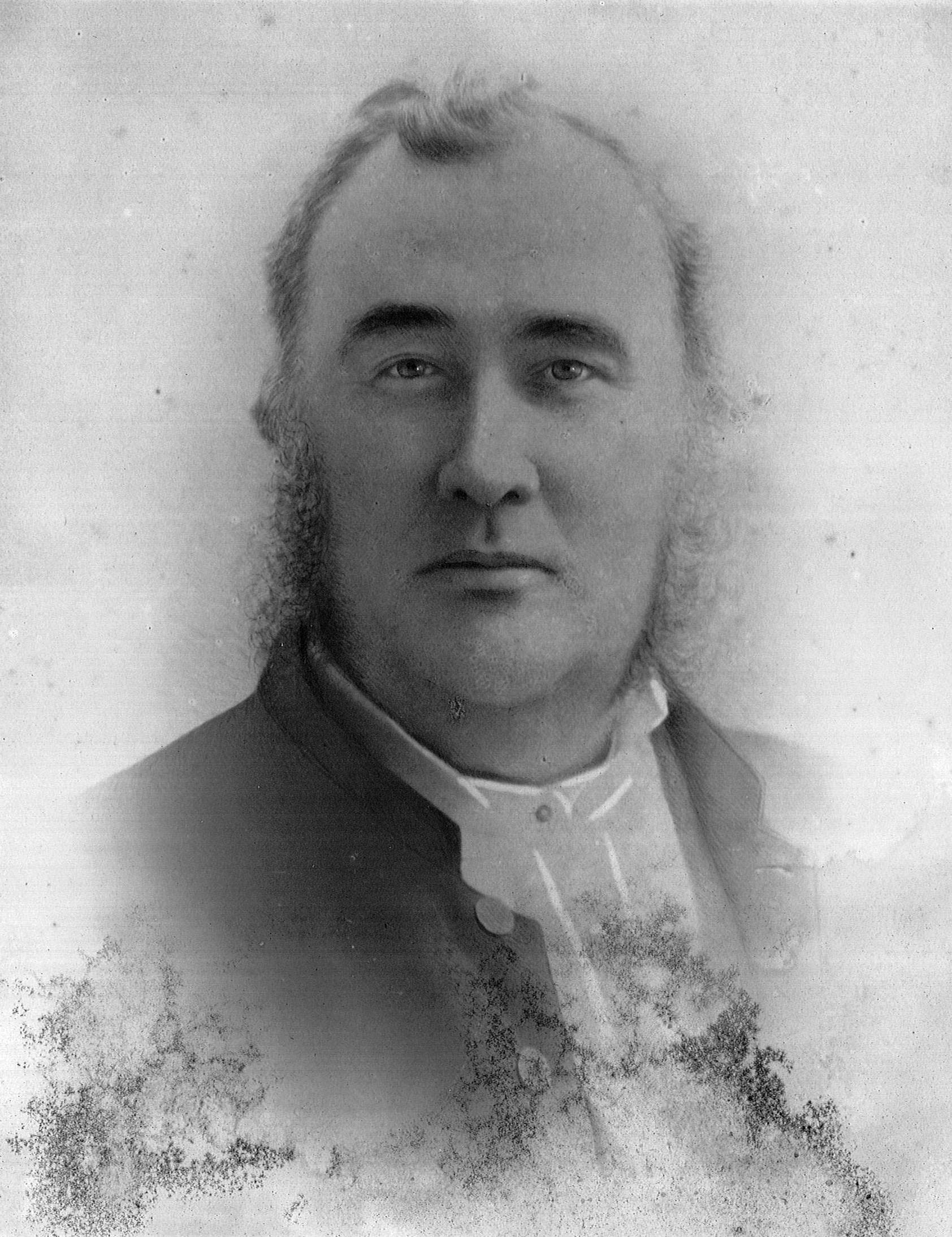

Prime Minister of Tonga
- In office April 1881 – July 1890
- Monarch: George Tupou I
- Preceded by: Tēvita ʻUnga
- Succeeded by: Siaosi Tukuʻaho

Personal details
- Born: 1836 London, United Kingdom
- Died: 16 November 1903 (aged 66–67) Haʻapai, Tonga
- Spouse: Elizabeth Powell (m. 1859)

Shirley Waldemar Baker (1836 – 16 November 1903) was a Methodist missionary and politician in Tonga during the late 19th century. He was a key adviser to King George Tupou I and served as prime minister of Tonga from 1881 to 1890.

Baker was born in London and moved to Australia in 1852, where he completed missionary training. He first arrived in Tonga in 1860 and in 1869 became president of the Wesleyan mission. Baker soon became a key adviser to George Tupou and helped draft the Tongan constitution adopted in 1875. His activities in the kingdom, including the establishment of the Free Church of Tonga, brought him into conflict with British authorities elsewhere in the Pacific. He was deported on the orders of the High Commissioner of the Western Pacific in 1890, but he returned to Tonga in 1898 and lived on Haʻapai until his death in 1903.

== Early life ==
Baker was born in London in 1836. He was the son of Jane (née Woolmer) and George Baker. His father was an Anglican clergyman, while his maternal grandfather was a Methodist minister.

Baker arrived in Melbourne in 1852 during the Victorian gold rush, as a stowaway. Historian Niel Gunson later speculated that he was "probably escaping from his heredity and also possible neglect", as his father later died at the Cleveland Street Workhouse of alcoholism and syphilis. Baker subsequently worked on the goldfields as a farmhand, miner and apothecary's assistant. In 1855, he became a teacher at a Wesleyan school in Castlemaine. He subsequent undertook training as a missionary, during which time he stayed with his uncle Edward Stone Parker at Franklinford, the site of a former Aboriginal protectorate.

== Tonga ==
Etching of Baker published by The Australasian Sketcher, 1887

Baker was sent to Tonga as a missionary in 1860. He became a close confidante of King George Tupou I and in 1862 helped draft a new code of laws which included the emancipation of serfs in the kingdom. He returned to Australia in 1866 and worked as an itinerant preacher for several years.

In 1869, Baker returned to Tonga as president of the Wesleyan mission district. He significantly expanded the presence of the Methodist mission and secured its financial independence through increased tithing. In 1875 the Wesley Conference granted ecclesiastical independence to the Tongan district. Baker continued to serve as an adviser to George Tupou and was the primary author of the Tongan constitution adopted in 1875. He negotiated the establishment of Germany–Tonga relations in 1876, which brought him to the attention of British authorities and resulted in his recall to Australia in 1879.

Baker resigned from the mission and returned to Tonga in 1880, where George Tupou appointed him prime minister. He was credited with reorganising the national finances, revising land laws and establishing a system of state schools. In 1885 he helped establish the Free Church of Tonga in opposition to the Australian-controlled Wesleyan mission. Baker attempted to establish diplomatic relations with the Hawaiian Kingdom, having earlier used the Hawaiian constitution as a model for the 1875 Tongan constitution. He corresponded with Hawaiian foreign minister William Lowthian Green but plans to exchange ambassadors and sign a friendship treaty did not eventuate.

Baker was eventually deported from Tonga in 1890 on the orders of John Bates Thurston, the High Commissioner for the Western Pacific, following the assertion of British influence over the islands.

=== Assassination attempts ===
In late 1886, a group of chiefs from Muʻa – led by Siaosi Tukuʻaho – hatched a plan to arrest Baker and deport him to Fiji, likely with the support of Basil Thomson. This subsequently evolved into an assassination plot, with four outlaws being sheltered in Muʻa volunteering their services. The first attempt was made on Christmas Eve, when Lavuso – a Muʻa supporter and staff member of Tupou College – and another man went to Baker's house intending to club him to death, but were distracted by the presence of a group of schoolchildren. A second attempt was made a week later on New Year's Eve, with the assailants lying in wait for Baker to attend a service at the king's chapel but ultimately aborting the attempt.

On 12 January 1887, the four outlaws and Tōpui, the son of a Muʻa chief, arrived in Nukuʻalofa and hid along Beach Road near Baker's house. With no opportunity arising to ambush Baker, they stayed with Lavuso at Tupou College before returning to Beach Road the following evening. Around 7:30 pm, Baker went out for an evening drive in his horse and buggy, taking his son Shirley Jr. and daughter Beatrice. The assassins fired upon the buggy, hitting Shirley Jr. in the shoulder and Beatrice in the thigh, as well as wounding the horse. Beatrice also received a spinal injury after falling out of the buggy.

King Tupou regarded the shooting as an act of rebellion and called on the chiefs of Tongatapu to assemble armed forces for an expedition against the Muʻa conspirators. A group of Tupou's supporters ransacked Tōpui's village of Holonga, with the Muʻa chiefs ultimately convincing Tōpui to give himself up rather than confront the government forces. The group of outlaws also surrendered, and over a dozen co-conspirators were arrested, imprisoned and charged with treason. On 31 January, ten of the leading conspirators, including Tōpui, were found guilty and sentenced to death, while four others who had turned King's evidence were pardoned or given light sentences.

Baker reportedly intended for the ten death sentences to be commuted to life imprisonment, but was over-ruled by Tupou who ordered the immediate execution of six men without Baker's knowledge. The condemned men were taken in leg irons to the small islet of Malinoa, along with 50 soldiers, and executed by firing squad. Baker subsequently convinced Tupou to postpone the executions of the four remaining men, who were instead banished from Tonga. Tupou also ordered or sanctioned a number of punitive expeditions against individuals associated with the conspirators, with at least twenty villages being looted and a number of assaults carried out.

== Later life ==
Baker towards the end of his life

After his deportation, Baker visited the United States and attempted to lobby the American government to intervene in Tonga on his behalf. However, his efforts were hindered by publication in November 1890 of a report by Basil Thomson into Tonga's finances, which showed a number of irregularities in the Treasury Department and that Baker had used government funds to pay for groceries, alcohol and other personal expenses. Baker subsequently settled in Auckland where he "owned a large house in a select part of the town" and reportedly had "extensive investments". However, by the mid-1890s he was "reduced to comparative penury" by a nationwide economic depression.

In February 1897, Baker returned to Tonga and sought appointment as government medical officer. His application was refused following the interference of British officials. He made a further visit in October 1897, unsuccessfully applying for appointment as a Free Church minister, before returning to Tonga permanently in May 1898. He settled in Haʻapai where he had built a small house, living with his three unmarried daughters who opened a school. He supplemented the family income by dispensing medicines.

At a Free Church conference in Vavaʻu in August 1898, Baker unsuccessfully sought back-payment from the church of £100 per annum plus ten percent interest. He subsequently resigned his membership in the Free Church and inaugurated the Siasi a Vikia ("Queen Victoria's Church") in Haʻapai, which claimed an Anglican affiliation. In November 1898 he returned to Tongatapu and established a branch of his new church. The following year, Siaosi Tukuʻaho and his family briefly affiliated with Baker as a protest against the Free Church. However, Baker was soon publicly denounced by Tupou's successor George Tupou II after it was discovered that he had no formal affiliation with the Church of England, and the Tongatapu congregation rejected his leadership in favour of Alfred Willis, the former Anglican bishop of Hawaii.

Baker spent his final years in Haʻapai, dying of a heart attack on 16 November 1903. According to local tradition he was "found dead with the tongue protruding, by which the Tongans knew that the devil had got him at the end". His grave and monument still stand as a tourist attraction in Pangai on Lifuka, Haʻapai.

== See also ==
- William Mariner's accounts of pre-Christian Tonga
- Rev Sioeli Nau, a Methodist minister
- Rev Dr James Egan Moulton
- King George Tupou I

== Notes ==
Political offices
Vacant Title last held by Tēvita ʻUnga	Prime Minister of Tonga; 1881–1890	Succeeded by Siaosi Tukuʻaho
