= List of Catholic dioceses in Oceania =

This is a list of the Roman and Eastern Catholic dioceses in Oceania.

Because Oceania is one of the more sparsely populated areas of the world, the majority of its dioceses are located in Australia and New Zealand, although they range as far as the Midway Atoll in the Pacific Ocean to Tasmania.

== Episcopal Conference of Australia ==
=== Exempt ===
Exempt archdioceses are immediately subject to the Holy See:

- Archdiocese of Canberra and Goulburn, covering the federal district Canberra and adjacent part of New South Wales
- Archdiocese of Hobart, covering Tasmania
- Military Ordinariate of Australia, for the armed forces
- Personal Ordinariate of Our Lady of the Southern Cross, with see in Maylands, Western Australia (for former Anglicans in Australia and Japan)

=== Ecclesiastical Province of Adelaide ===
The ecclesiastical Province of Adelaide covers the whole of the state of South Australia, and the territory of the Northern Territory

- Metropolitan Archdiocese of Adelaide, in South Australia
  - Diocese of Darwin, covering the Northern Territory
  - Diocese of Point Pirie, in South Australia

=== Ecclesiastical Province of Brisbane ===
The ecclesiastical Province of Brisbane covers the whole of the state of Queensland

- Metropolitan Archdiocese of Brisbane
  - Diocese of Cairns
  - Diocese of Rockhampton
  - Diocese of Toowoomba
  - Diocese of Townsville

=== Ecclesiastical Province of Melbourne ===
The province covers the whole of the state of Victoria

- Metropolitan Archdiocese of Melbourne
  - Diocese of Ballarat
  - Diocese of Sale
  - Diocese of Sandhurst
  - Ukrainian Catholic Diocese of Saints Peter and Paul of Melbourne (Ukrainian Catholic Church Byzantine Rite Eparchy (Diocese), with cathedral see in North Melbourne, Victoria, Australia; also covers New Zealand and Oceania

=== Ecclesiastical Province of Perth ===
The ecclesiastical Province of Perth covers all of Western Australia

- Metropolitan Archdiocese of Perth, also covers Christmas Island, Cocos Islands, Heard Island and McDonald Islands
  - Diocese of Broome
  - Diocese of Bunbury
  - Diocese of Geraldton

=== Ecclesiastical Province of Sydney ===
The province covers most of the state of New South Wales

- Metropolitan Archdiocese of Sydney, also covers Norfolk Island
  - Diocese of Armidale
  - Diocese of Bathurst
  - Diocese of Broken Bay
  - Diocese of Lismore
  - Diocese of Maitland-Newcastle
  - Diocese of Parramatta
  - Diocese of Wagga Wagga
  - Diocese of Wilcannia-Forbes
  - Diocese of Wollongong

=== Eastern Catholic dioceses ===
- Maronite Diocese of Saint Maron of Sydney, with cathedral see in Redfern, New South Wales; immediately subject to the Maronite Patriarch of Antioch (in Lebanon; Antiochian Rite)
- Melkite Greek Catholic Eparchy of Saint Michael Archangel in Sydney, with cathedral see in Darlington, New South Wales; also covers New Zealand; immediately subject to the Melkite Catholic Patriarchate of Antioch in Syria (a Byzantine Rite)
- Syro-Malabar Diocese of Saint Thomas the Apostle of Melbourne, with cathedral see in Melbourne, Victoria; immediately subject to the Major Archbishop of Ernakulam–Angamaly in India (a Syro-Oriental Rite)
- Chaldean Catholic Eparchy of Saint Thomas the Apostle of Sydney, with cathedral see at Bossley Park, New South Wales; also covers New Zealand; immediately subject to the Chaldean Catholic Patriarch of Babylon in Iraq (Chaldean Rite).

== Episcopal Conference of New Zealand ==
- See under § Episcopal Conference of Australia for the Chaldean Catholic, Melkite and Ukrainian Catholic dioceses competent for both countries, with sees in Sydney, Melbourne.
- See also the infra-Episcopal Conference of the Pacific §§ Ecclesiastical Province of Samoa-Apia, Ecclesiastical Province of Suva, and Immediately Subject to the Holy See for three island dependencies of New Zealand, being: the diocese of Rarotonga (on the Cook Islands, also covering Niue) and the Mission Sui Iuris of Tokelau, both suffragans of the Metropolitan Archbishop of Suva
- Exempt, i.e., immediately subject to the Holy See:
  - Military Ordinariate of New Zealand, for the armed forces

=== Ecclesiastical Province of Wellington ===
- Metropolitan Archdiocese of Wellington
  - Diocese of Auckland
  - Diocese of Christchurch
  - Diocese of Dunedin
  - Diocese of Hamilton in New Zealand
  - Diocese of Palmerston North

== Episcopal Conference of the Pacific ==
- For Ukrainian Catholics, see § Episcopal Conference of Australia, under Melbourne
- The "United States Minor Outlying Islands" (U.S. Minor Islands), such as Wake, Midway, Johnston, which are Unincorporated Territories of USA, are administered by the Archdiocese for the Military Services of the United States in Washington, D.C.
- Honolulu (on and for Hawaii) is a suffragan diocese in the ecclesiastical Province of San Francisco in California, U.S.
- Exempt, i.e., immediately subject to the Holy See
  - Diocese of Tonga

=== Ecclesiastical Province of Agaña ===
- Metropolitan Archdiocese of Agaña
  - Diocese of Caroline Islands
  - Diocese of Chalan Kanoa
  - Prefecture of the Marshall Islands

=== Ecclesiastical Province of Nouméa ===
- Metropolitan Archdiocese of Nouméa
  - Diocese of Port-Vila
  - Diocese of Wallis et Futuna

=== Ecclesiastical Province of Papeete ===
- Metropolitan Archdiocese of Papeete
  - Diocese of Taiohae o Tefenuaenata

=== Ecclesiastical Province of Samoa-Apia ===
- Archdiocese of Samoa-Apia
  - Diocese of Samoa-Pago Pago
  - Mission Sui Iuris of Funafuti
  - Mission Sui Iuris of Tokelau

=== Ecclesiastical Province of Suva ===
- Metropolitan Archdiocese of Suva
  - Diocese of Rarotonga
  - Diocese of Tarawa and Nauru

== Episcopal Conference of Papua New Guinea ==
=== Ecclesiastical Province of Madang ===
- Metropolitan Metropolitan Archdiocese of Madang
  - Diocese of Aitape
  - Diocese of Lae
  - Diocese of Vanimo
  - Diocese of Wewak

=== Ecclesiastical Province of Mount Hagen ===
- Metropolitan Archdiocese of Mount Hagen
  - Diocese of Goroka
  - Diocese of Kundiawa
  - Diocese of Mendi
  - Diocese of Wabag

=== Ecclesiastical Province of Port Moresby ===
- Metropolitan Archdiocese of Port Moresby
  - Diocese of Alotau-Sideia
  - Diocese of Bereina
  - Diocese of Daru-Kiunga
  - Diocese of Kerema

=== Ecclesiastical Province of Rabaul ===
- Metropolitan Archdiocese of Rabaul
  - Diocese of Bougainville
  - Diocese of Kavieng
  - Diocese of Kimbe

== Episcopal Conference of the Solomon Islands ==
=== Ecclesiastical Province of Honaira ===
- Metropolitan Archdiocese of Honiara
  - Diocese of Auki
  - Diocese of Gizo

== See also ==
- List of Catholic dioceses (structured view)
- List of Catholic dioceses (alphabetical)
