= Veikune =

Veikune is a surname and Tongan hereditary title. Notable people with the surname include:

- David Veikune (born 1985), American football player
- Viliami Veasiʻi Veikune, Tongan noble and politician
- Fatafehi Fuatakifolaha, Lord Veikune until 2006
