= Santa Paola Romana =

- Church of Saint Paula the Roman
- Chiesa di Santa Paola Romana
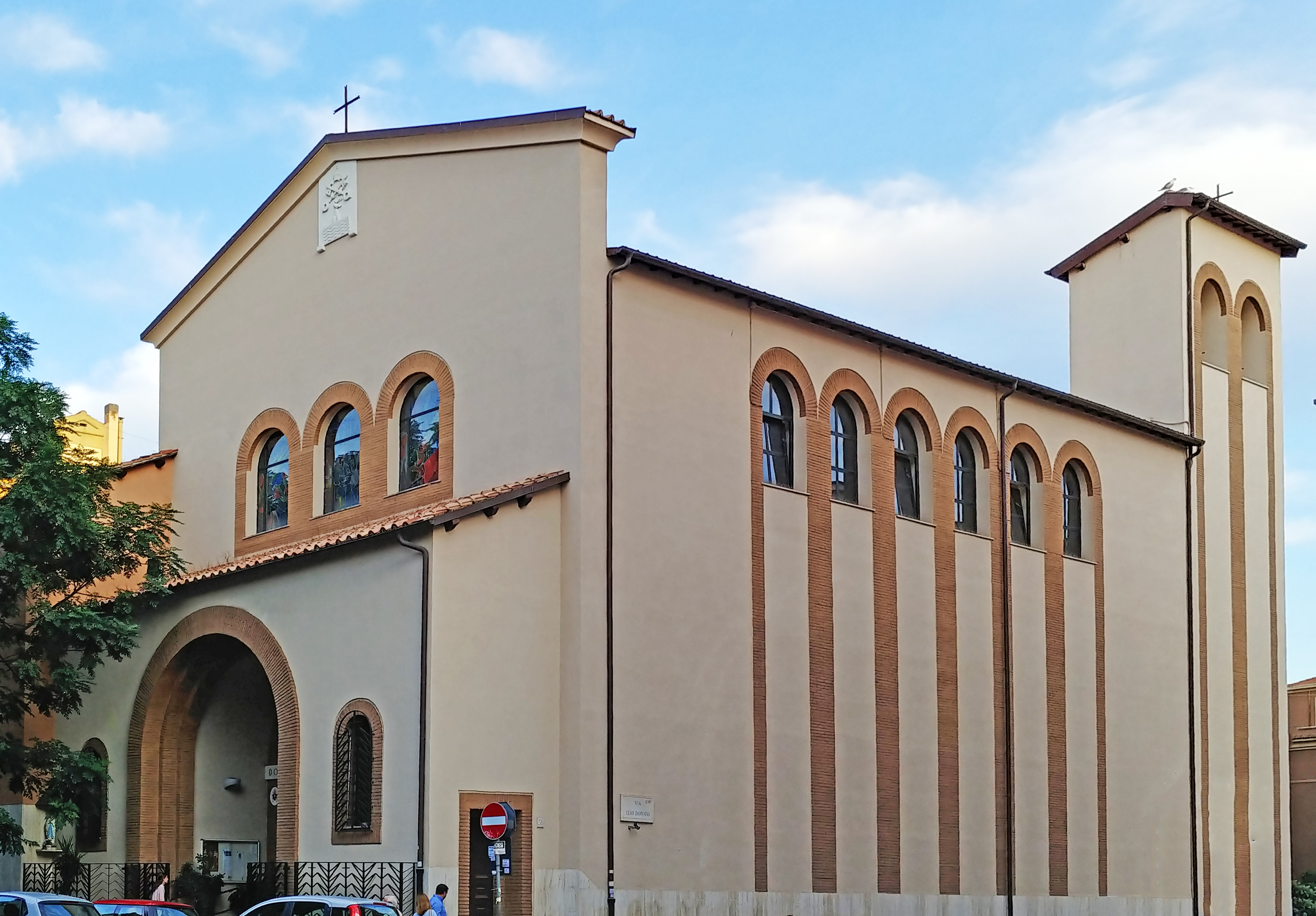
- Click on the map for a fullscreen view
- 41°54′48″N 12°26′35″E
- Location: Via Duccio Galimberti 9, Trionfale, Rome
- Country: Italy
- Language: Italian
- Denomination: Catholic
- Tradition: Roman Rite
- Website: www.santapaolaromana.org

History
- Status: titular church
- Dedication: Saint Paula of Rome
- Consecrated: 1951

Architecture
- Architect(s): Tullio Rossi, Silvio Casadori
- Architectural type: Modern
- Groundbreaking: 1949
- Completed: 1951

Administration
- Diocese: Rome

Santa Paola Romana is a 20th-century parish church and titular church in Rome, Italy, dedicated to Saint Paula of Rome.

== History ==
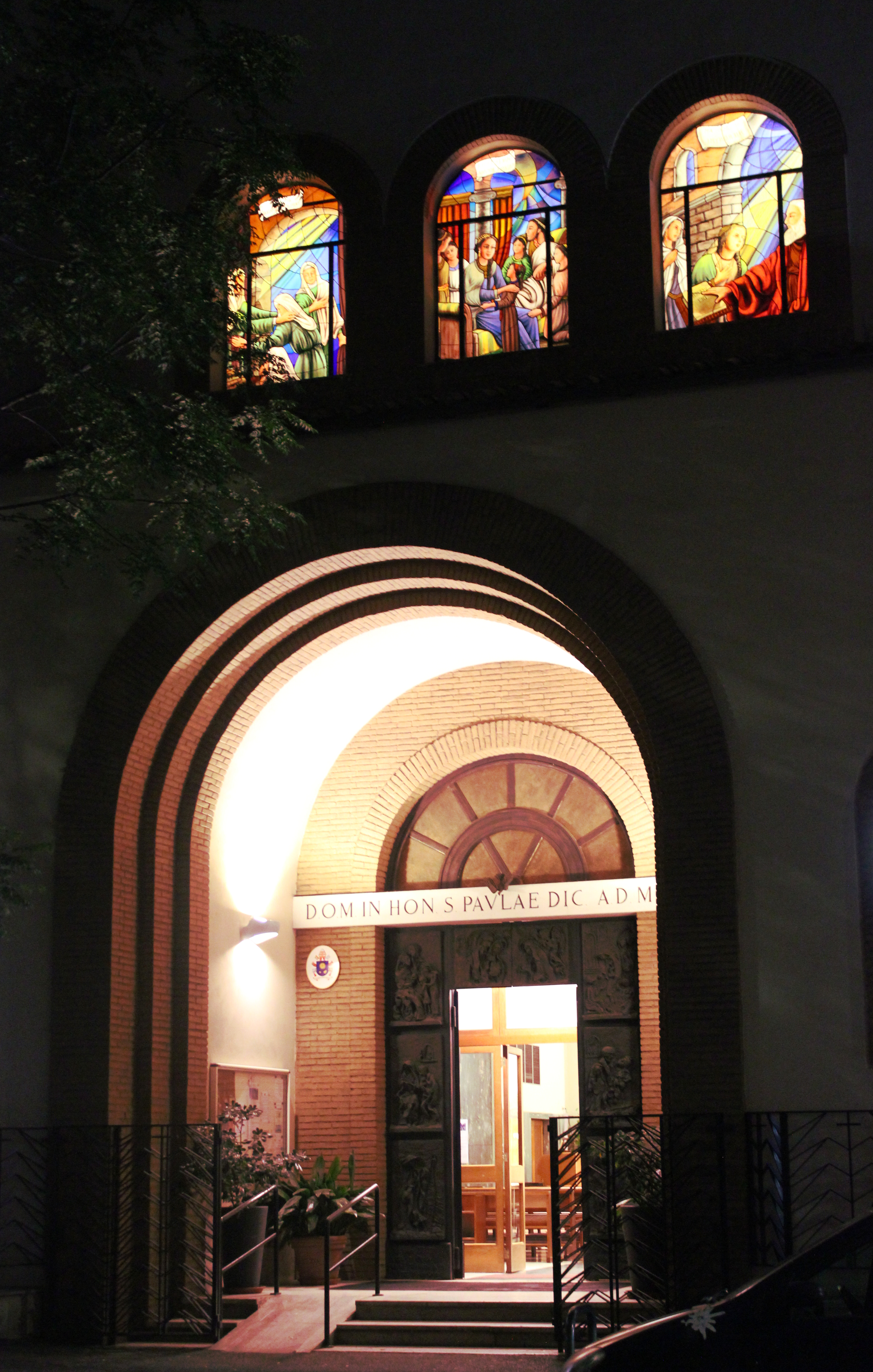
The vestibule at night, lit up

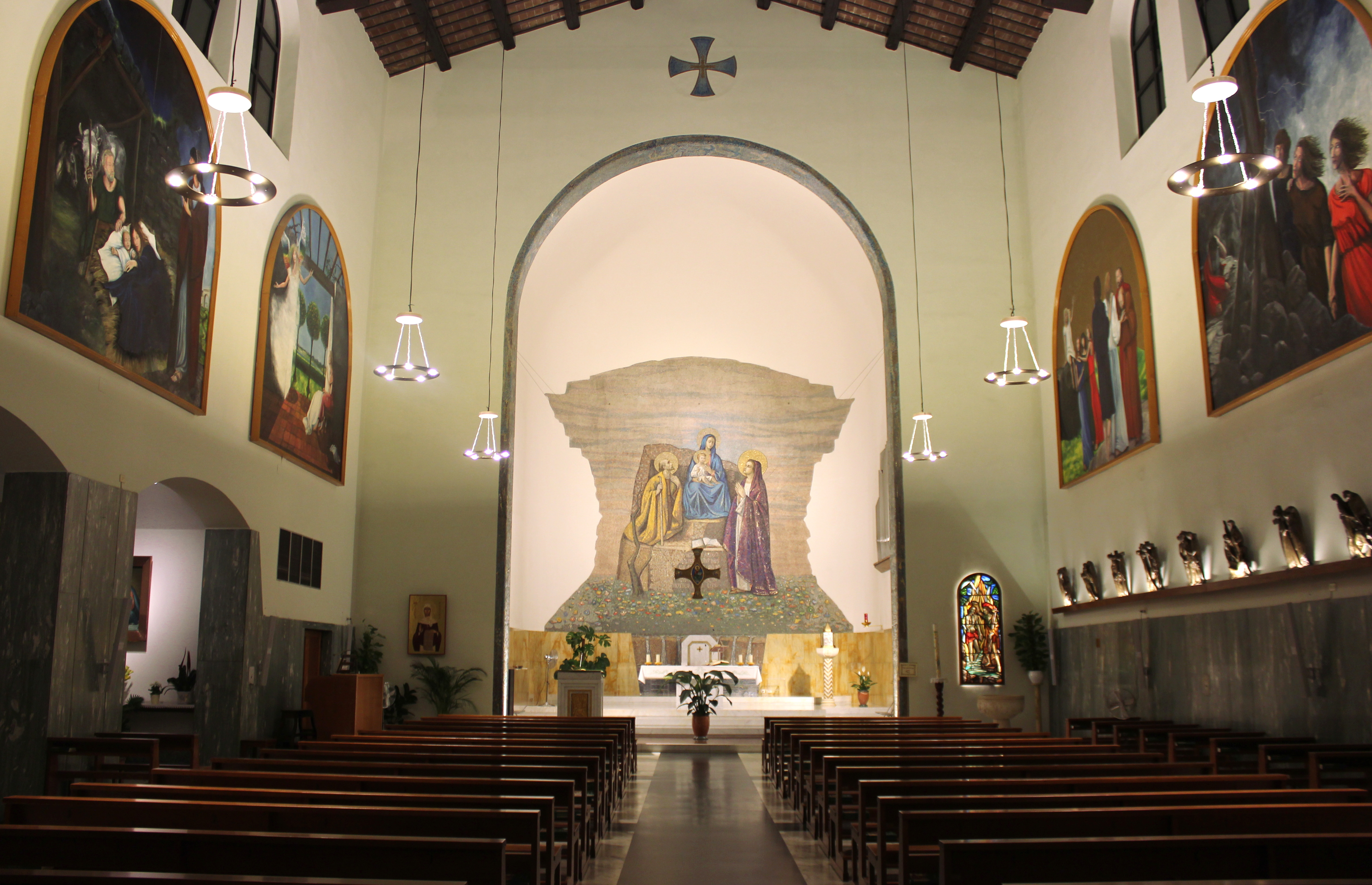
The main altar dedicated to Saint Paula

The church was built in 1949–51. Its bronze door was added in 2001, sculpted by Capri Otti.

On 14 February 2015, it was made a titular church to be held by a cardinal-priest, with its first titular being the Tongan bishop Soane Patita Paini Mafi.

Titulars

- Soane Patita Paini Mafi (2015–present)

== See also ==
- List of titular churches in Rome
- San Girolamo della Carità
