= Soane Patita Paini Mafi =

Tongan Catholic cardinal

His Eminence and Lordship Soane Patita Paini Mafi
- Cardinal; Bishop of Tonga
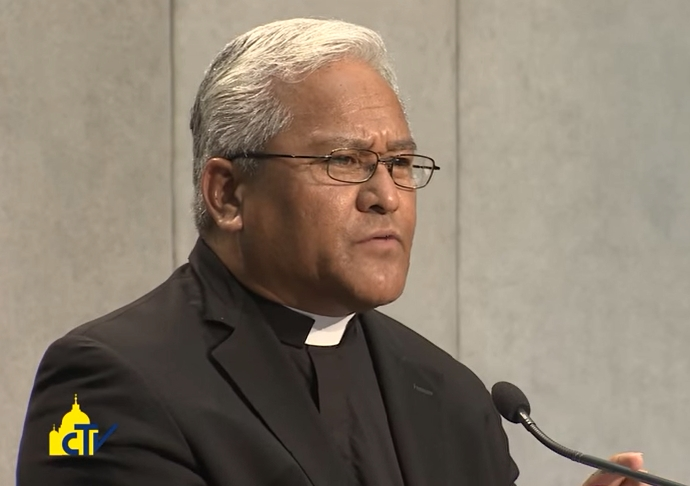
- The cardinal in Rome on 23 October 2015.
- Church: Catholic Church
- Diocese: Tonga
- See: Tonga
- Appointed: 18 April 2008
- Installed: 21 April 2008
- Predecessor: Soane Lilo Foliaki
- Other post: Cardinal-Priest of Santa Paola Romana (2015-)
- Previous posts: Coadjutor Bishop of Tonga (2007-08); President of CEPAC (2010-16)

Orders
- Ordination: 29 June 1991 by Patelisio Punou-Ki-Hihifo Finau
- Consecration: 4 October 2007 by Soane Lilo Foliaki
- Created cardinal: 14 February 2015 by Pope Francis
- Rank: Cardinal-Priest

Personal details
- Born: Soane Patita Paini Mafi; 19 December 1961 (age 64) Nukuʻalofa, Tonga
- Motto: Ke Loloto e Tui (Deepen the Faith)
- Coat of arms: Soane Patita Paini Mafi's coat of arms

Ordination history of Soane Patita Paini Mafi
History
Episcopal consecration
- Principal consecrator: Soane Lilo Foliaki, SM
- Co-consecrators: Alapati Lui Mataeliga; Petero Mataca
Cardinalate
- Elevated by: Pope Francis

Styles of Soane Patita Paini Mafi
- Reference style: His Eminence and Lordship
- Spoken style: Your Eminence and Lordship
- Religious style: Cardinal
- Informal style: Cardinal

Soane Patita Paini Mafi (Tongan pronunciation: [soaːne patita paɪni mafi]) (born 19 December 1961) is a Tongan Catholic prelate who has served as Bishop of Tonga since 2008. Pope Francis made him the first cardinal from Tonga in 2015; he was then the youngest member of the College of Cardinals.

== Early life ==
Mafi was born into a strongly Catholic family. His father and grandfather were catechists. He grew up in Tonga and, as a young man, joined a youth group at his parish in Kolofo'ou near the capital Nuku'alofa on the main island of Tongatapu. He studied for the priesthood at the Pacific Regional Seminary in Suva, Fiji. He was ordained a priest in 1991 at the age of 29.

== Priesthood ==
He then spent four years in parish work on the Tongan island group of Ha'apai. In 1995 Bishop Foliaki appointed him Vicar-General of the diocese at the age of 34. He was only 5 years ordained.

He spent three years studying religious education at Loyola University, Baltimore, Maryland, graduating in 2000. He was then stationed for six years in Suva (Fiji), engaged in the formation training of local priests.

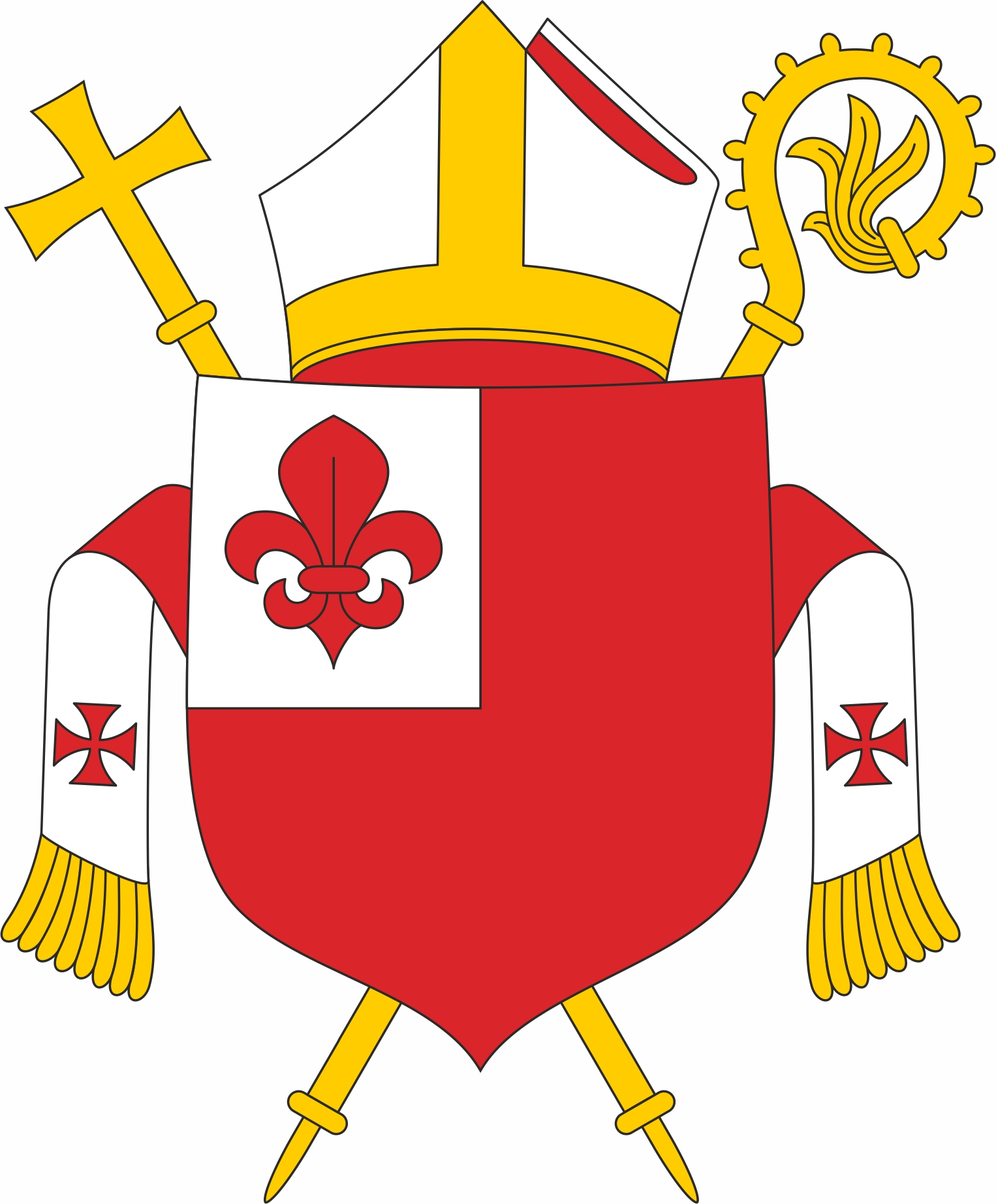
Coat of arms of Diocese of Tonga

== Bishop ==
Mafi was appointed coadjutor bishop of Tonga in June 2007 and was consecrated bishop in that year. When he succeeded Bishop Soane Lilo Foliaki as Bishop of Tonga on 18 April 2008, he became the first diocesan priest to be bishop of the diocese of Tonga. His three predecessors were members of the Society of Mary. He participated in the Third Extraordinary General Assembly of the Synod of Bishops on the Pastoral Challenges of the Family in the Context of Evangelization held on October 5–19, 2014. Mafi has been president of the Episcopal Conference of the Pacific since 2010.

== Cardinal ==
On 14 February 2015, Pope Francis appointed Mafi a cardinal with the title of Cardinal-Priest of Santa Paola Romana. On 13 April 2015, he was appointed a member of the Congregation for the Evangelization of Peoples and of the Pontifical Council Cor Unum for Human and Christian Development.

He participated as a cardinal elector in the 2025 papal conclave that elected Pope Leo XIV.

== Honours and awards ==
National honours

- Order of Queen Sālote Tupou III, Commander (31 July 2008).

== See also ==
- Cardinals created by Francis
- Roman Catholicism in Tonga

Catholic Church titles
Preceded by Soane Lilo Foliaki	Bishop of Tonga; 2008–present	Incumbent
Preceded by titular church established	Cardinal Priest of Santa Paola Romana; 2015–present	Incumbent
