= Soane Lilo Foliaki =

Soane Lilo Foliaki S.M.
- Bishop of Tonga
- Church: Catholic Church
- Diocese: Diocese of Tonga
- In office: 10 June 1994 – 18 April 2008
- Predecessor: Patelisio Punou-Ki-Hihifo Finau
- Successor: Soane Patita Paini Mafi

Orders
- Ordination: 21 July 1959 by John Rodgers
- Consecration: 23 June 1994 by Thomas A. White

Personal details
- Born: 18 April 1933 Maʻufanga, Nukuʻalofa, Tonga, British Empire
- Died: 24 December 2013 (aged 80) Nukuʻalofa, Tonga

Soane Lilo Foliaki (18 April 1933 − 24 December 2013) was the third Roman Catholic bishop of the Roman Catholic Diocese of Tonga.

== Education ==
Soane was educated at St Patrick's College, Silverstream. He graduated the University of Hull, and achieved a degree in mathematics.

== Priesthood ==
He was ordained to the priesthood on 21 July 1955, Foliaki was named bishop of the Roman Catholic Diocese of Tonga, Tonga on 10 June 1994 and retired on 18 April 2008.

== Death ==
He died in Nuku‘alofa on 24 December 2013. His funeral was held at St Peter Chanel’s church, Clover Park, New Zealand on 29 December 2013.

Catholic Church titles
Preceded by Patelisio Punou-Ki-Hihifo Finau	Bishop of Tonga; 1994-2008	Succeeded by Soane Patita Paini Mafi
