= Jean-Amand Lamaze =

Jean-Amand Lamaze S.M.
- Vicar Apostolic of Central Oceania
- Church: Catholic Church
- See: Vicariate Apostolic of Central Oceania
- In office: 23 May 1879 – 9 September 1906
- Predecessor: Aloys Elloy
- Successor: Armand Olier
- Other post: Titular Bishop of Olympus (1879-1906)
- Previous posts: Apostolic Administrator of Archipelago of the Navigators (1879-1896)

Orders
- Ordination: 1 May 1857
- Consecration: 21 December 1879 by Louis-Marie Caverot

Personal details
- Born: 28 March 1833 Saint-Michel-sur-Meurthe, Kingdom of France
- Died: 9 September 1906 (aged 73)

Jean-Amand Lamaze (1833 - 9 September 1906) was a French clergyman and bishop for the Roman Catholic Diocese of Tonga. He was born in Saint-Michel-sur-Meurthe and came to Australia in 1864. He then worked as a missionary in Tonga for 15 years, before being appointed bishop in 1879. He died in 1906 and was buried in Maufaga.
