= Saint-Michel-sur-Meurthe =

- Commune
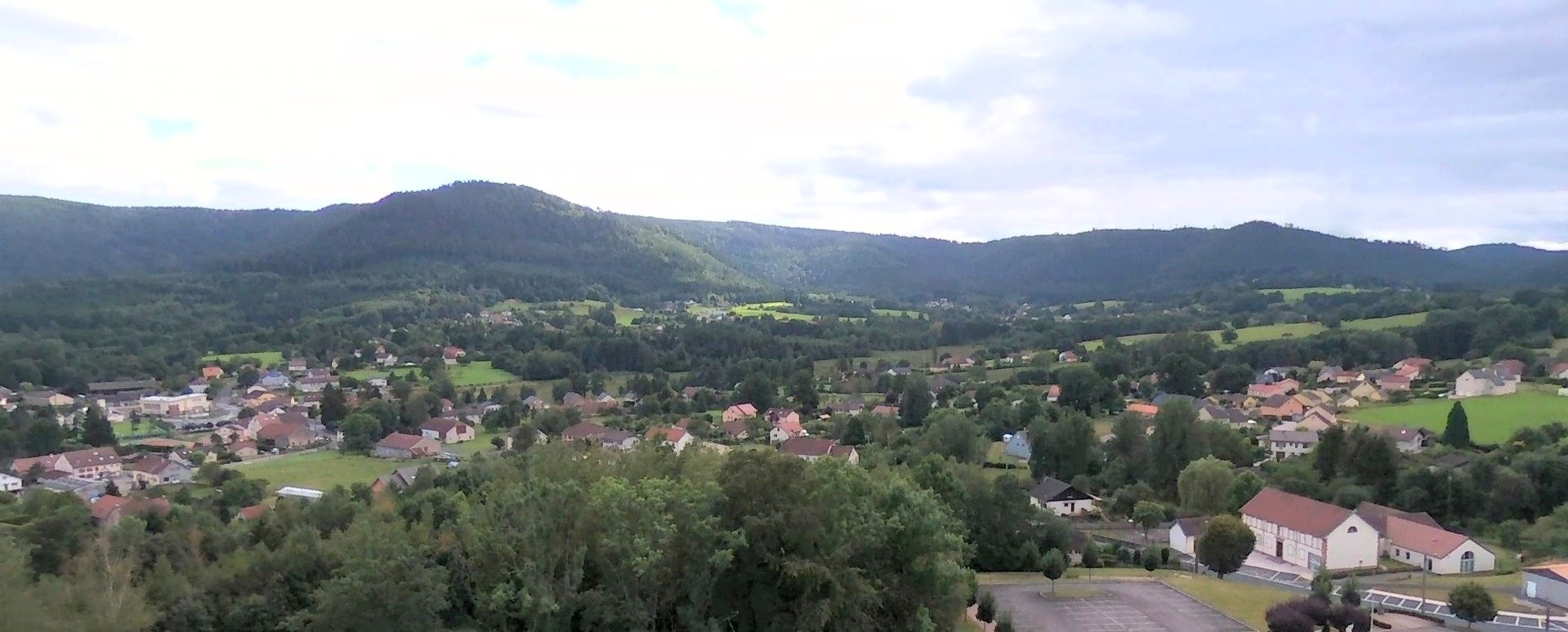
- A general view of Saint-Michel-sur-Meurthe

- Coat of arms
- Location of Saint-Michel-sur-Meurthe
- Location within France Location within Grand Est
- Coordinates: 48°19′06″N 6°53′15″E
- Country: France
- Region: Grand Est
- Department: Vosges
- Arrondissement: Saint-Dié-des-Vosges
- Canton: Saint-Dié-des-Vosges-1
- Intercommunality: CA Saint-Dié-des-Vosges

Government
  - Mayor (2020–2026): William Mathis
- Area^{1}: 15.54 km^{2} (6.00 sq mi)
- Elevation: 314 m (1,030 ft)
- Highest elevation: 658 m (2,159 ft)
- Lowest elevation: 301 m (988 ft)
- Population (2023): 1,785
  - Density: 114.9/km^{2} (297.5/sq mi)
- Time zone: UTC+01:00 (CET)
  - Summer (DST): UTC+02:00 (CEST)
- INSEE/Postal code: 88428 /88470
- ^{1} French Land Register data, which excludes lakes, ponds, glaciers > 1 km^{2} (0.386 sq mi or 247 acres) and river estuaries.

Saint-Michel-sur-Meurthe (French pronunciation: [sɛ̃ miʃɛl syʁ mœʁt], literally Saint-Michel on Meurthe) is a commune in the Vosges department in Grand Est in northeastern France.

== Population ==
Historical population
Year	Pop.	±% p.a.
1968	1,307	—
1975	1,420	+1.19%
1982	1,567	+1.42%
1990	1,797	+1.73%
1999	1,951	+0.92%
2007	2,052	+0.63%
2012	2,012	−0.39%
2017	1,864	−1.52%
2023	1,785	−0.72%
Source: INSEE

== See also ==
- Communes of the Vosges department
