= Catholic Church in Tonga =

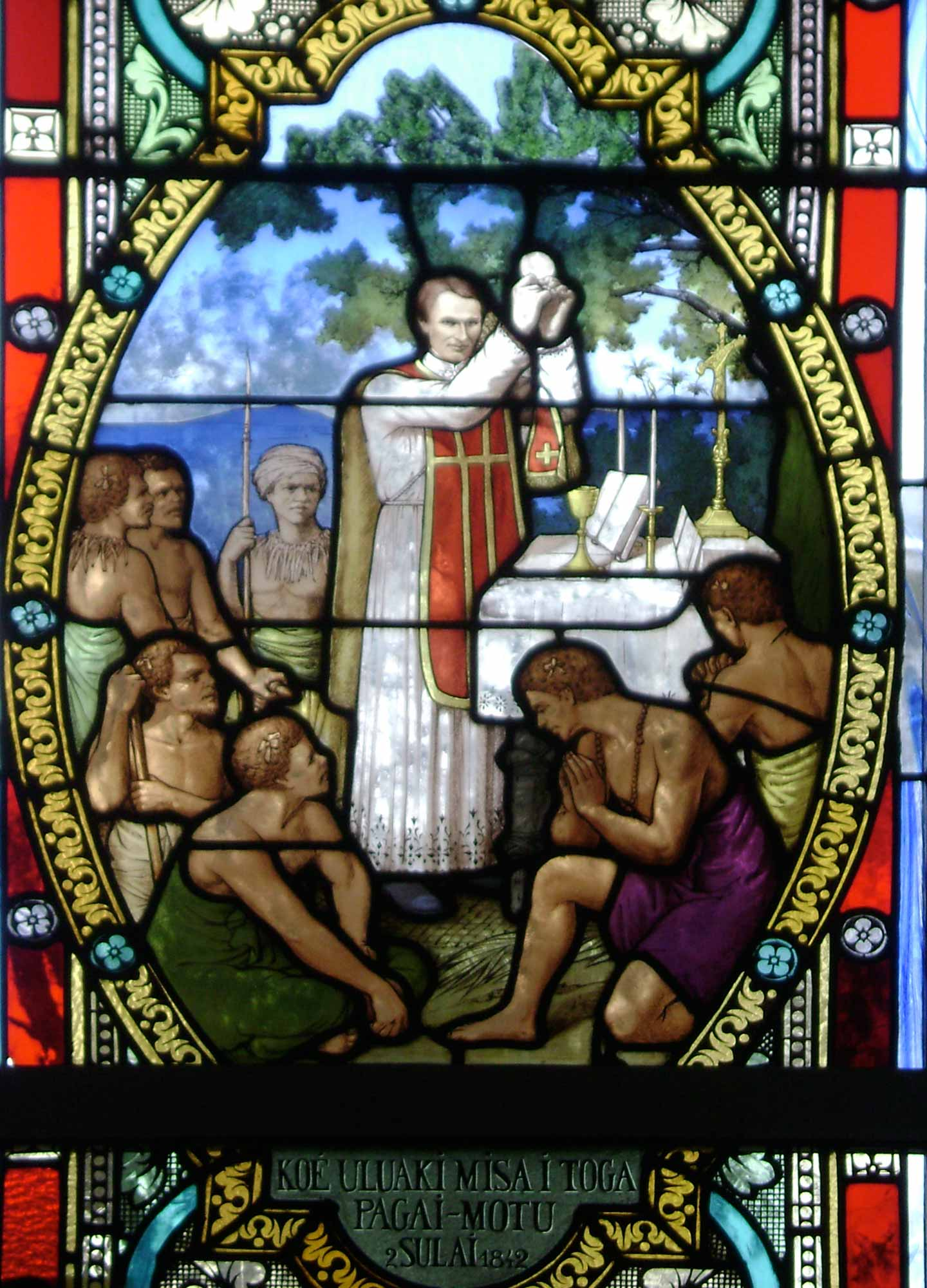
First mass in Tonga, depicted on a glass-in-lead window of the Catholic Church of Lapaha.

The Catholic Church in Tonga is part of the worldwide Catholic Church under the leadership of its local bishop in communion with the Bishop of Rome. It is estimated that approximately 16% of the population of the Pacific island Kingdom are Catholic, being 15,767 in 2004.^{1} Bishop Soane Patita Paini Mafi succeeded as Bishop of Tonga in 2008.

== History ==
Prior to the arrival of European sailors and missionaries, the islands of Tonga practised an animistic Polynesian religion. Responsibility for Oceania was given by the Catholic Church to the Society of the Sacred Hearts of Jesus and Mary in 1825; but the territory was judged to be too large, and the western portion was formed into a vicariate Apostolic and given to the Society of Mary in 1836, with Mgr Jean Baptiste Pompallier (1807–1871) appointed vicar Apostolic of Western Oceania. In 1842, the vicariate Apostolic of Central Oceania was created comprising New Caledonia, Tonga, Samoa, and Fiji. A later subdivision, reduced the vicariate to include only Tonga, the Wallis Islands, Futuna, and Niué. In 1937 the Vicariate Apostolic of Tonga Islands was created and in 1957 it became the Vicariate Apostolic of Tonga Islands and Niue and in 1966 the region became the Diocese of Tonga.

The conversion to Christianity of King George Tupou I, who was the political architect of modern Tonga, had a great influence on the religious life of the Polynesian nation. Of note, the last of the Tu'i Tonga line of Tongan Kings was Catholic. This is cited as being the reason that Lapaha in Mu'a, the former capital of the Tu'i Tongan Empire, is Catholic in contrast to neighbouring Tatakamotonga, which is predominantly Methodist. Tonga sent a delegation of young people for the first time to World Youth Day 2008 when it was held in Sydney, Australia.

There is no official state religion in Tonga, but around 63% of Tongans are Christian, including around 48% Protestant and 15% Catholic. There is also 18% American Mormon sect. The constitution declared Sabbath a holy day and the law restricts activities on Sundays. The Catholic Church in Tonga has accepted and included Tongan culture.

As in other countries, the Catholic Church runs schooling and social services in Tonga. On 4 January 2015, Pope Francis announced his intention to appoint the present Bishop of Tonga Soane Patita Paini Mafi as a cardinal at a Papal consistory to be held on 14 February 2015.

== See also ==
- Diocese of Tonga
