= Patelisio Punou-Ki-Hihifo Finau =

Tongan Roman Catholic bishop

- Bishop of Tonga
- Church: Roman Catholic
- Diocese: Tonga
- Predecessor: John Hubert Macey Rodgers
- Successor: Soane Lilo Foliaki
- Other post: President of CEPAC (1978–1982)
- Previous post: Coadjutor Bishop of Tonga

Orders
- Ordination: 21 July 1959
- Consecration: 13 February 1972 by Pope Paul VI

Personal details
- Born: 15 March 1934 Ma'ufanga, Tonga
- Died: 4 October 1993 (aged 59) Nukuʻalofa, Tonga

Patelisio Punou-Ki-Hihifo Finau (15 March 1934 – 4 October 1993) was the first Catholic Bishop of Tonga who was born in Tonga.

He was also, from 1978 to 1982, president of CEPAC.

== See also ==
- Roman Catholicism in Tonga

Catholic Church titles
Preceded by James William Gleeson	Titular bishop of Aurusuliana; 1971–1972	Succeeded by Roberto Antonio Dávila Uzcátegui
Preceded by John Hubert Macey Rodgers	Bishop of Tonga; 1972–1993	Succeeded by Soane Lilo Foliaki
