= Pierre Bataillon =

French catholic priest (1810 - 1877)

Pierre Bataillon S.M.
- Vicar Apostolic of Central Oceania
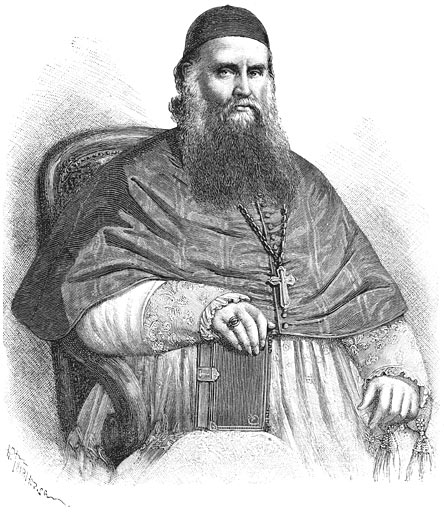
- Church: Catholic Church
- See: Vicariate Apostolic of Central Oceania
- In office: 23 August 1842 – 1863
- Predecessor: Position established
- Successor: Aloys Elloy
- Other post: Titular Bishop of Aenus (1842-1877)

Orders
- Ordination: 19 December 1835
- Consecration: 3 December 1843 by Guillaume Douarre

Personal details
- Born: 6 January 1810 Saint-Cyr-les-Vignes, Loire, French Empire
- Died: 10 April 1877 (aged 67)

Pierre Bataillon (born in 1810 in Saint-Cyr-les-Vignes - 1877) was a French clergyman and bishop for the Roman Catholic Diocese of Tonga. He was appointed bishop in 1842.

He was Titular Bishop of Aenus, First Vicar Apostolic of Central Oceania from 1842 until his death in 1877.
