= Diocese of Tonga =

Latin Catholic ecclesiastical jurisdiction in Tonga

Coordinates: 21°08′S 175°12′W

Diocese of Tonga Dioecesis Tongana
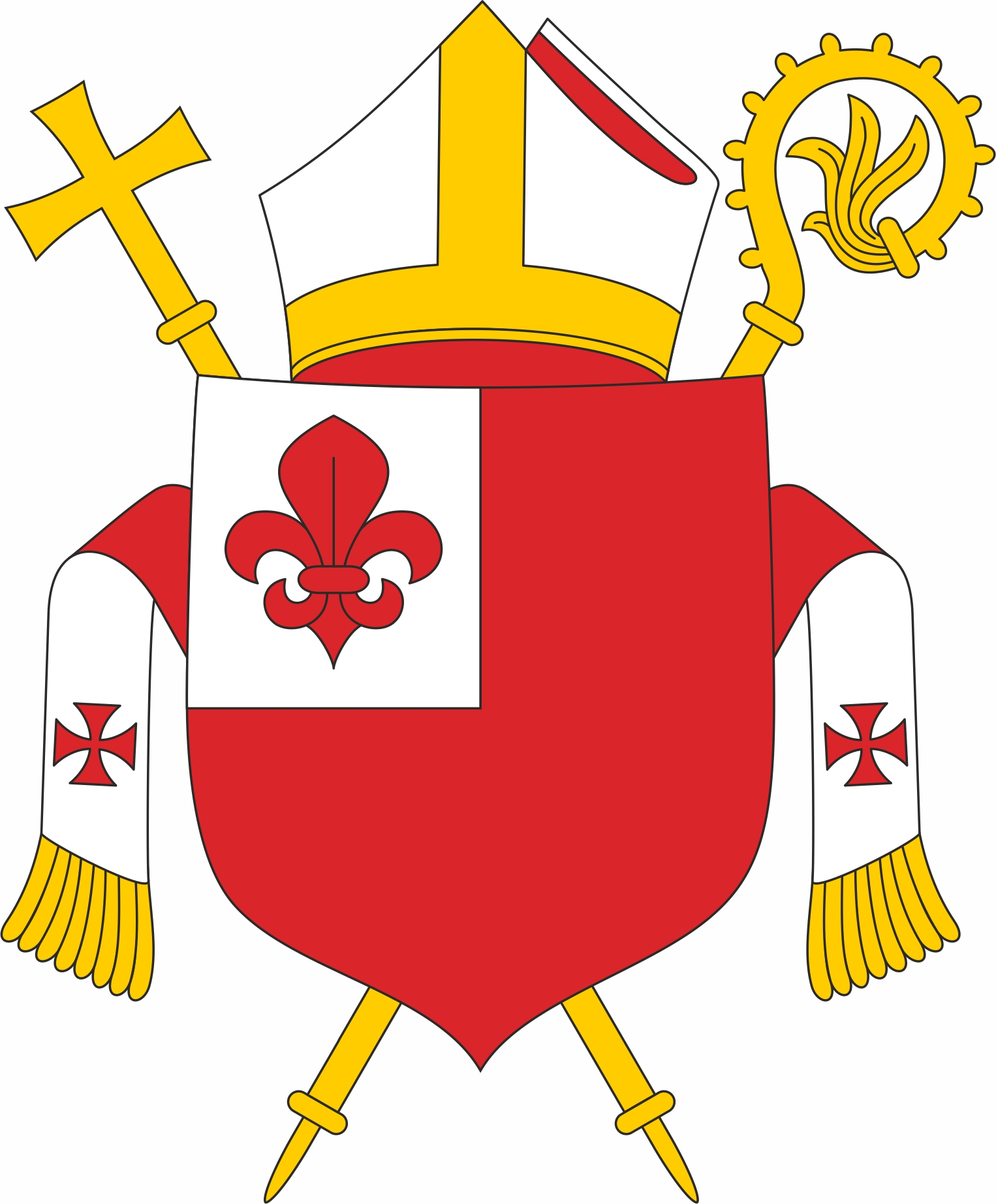
- Coat of arms of the diocese

Location
- Country: Tonga
- Territory: Tonga
- Ecclesiastical province: Immediately subject to the Holy See

Statistics
- Area: 947 km^{2} (366 sq mi)
- Population: Total; Catholics: (as of 2011); 104,660; 17,000 (7.6%)
- Parishes: 14

Information
- Denomination: Catholic Church
- Sui iuris church: Latin Church
- Rite: Roman Rite
- Established: 12 June 1966
- Cathedral: St. Mary's Cathedral
- Patron saint: The Immaculate Conception
- Secular priests: 38

Current leadership
- Pope: Leo XIV
- Bishop: Soane Patita Paini Mafi, Bishop of Tonga, Cardinal-Priest of Santa Paola Romana
- Bishops emeritus: Soane Lilo Foliaki, S.M.

Map
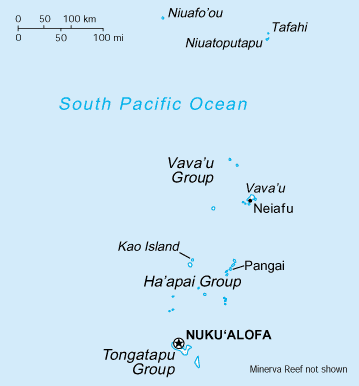

The Diocese of Tonga (Latin: Dioecesis Tongana) is a Latin Church ecclesiastical territory or diocese of the Catholic Church in Tonga. It was erected as part of the Vicariate Apostolic of Central Oceania in 1842, had subsequent name changes in 1937 and 1957 before being elevated to the Diocese of Tonga on June 21, 1966. Its cathedra is found in the Cathedral of the Immaculate Conception (Tongan: Malia Tupu 'Imākulata) in the capital Nuku'alofa. It is immediately exempt to the Holy See and not part of an ecclesiastical province. Niue was part of the diocese until 1972, when it was transferred to the Diocese of Rarotonga.

On 4 January 2015, Pope Francis announced that he would make Tonga's bishop, Soane Patita Paini Mafi, a cardinal on 14 February of that year.

== History ==
Basilica of Saint Anthony of Padua in Nuku'alofa

Along with the rest of the country, in the early twenty-first century the Catholic community of some 15,000 has been considered threatened with the loss of its home due to climate change.

== Bishops ==
=== Ordinaries ===
- Pierre Bataillon, S. M. (1842–1863)
- Aloys Elloy, S. M. (1872–1878)
- Jean-Amand Lamaze, S. M. (1879–1906)
- Armand Olier, S. M. (1906–1911)
- Joseph-Félix Blanc, S. M. (1912–1952)
- John Hubert Macey Rodgers, S.M. (1953–1972), appointed Titular Bishop of Caput Cilla
- Patelisio Punou-Ki-Hihifo Finau, S. M. (1972–1993)
- Soane Lilo Foliaki, S. M. (1994–2008)
- Soane Patita Paini Mafi (2008– ), elevated to Cardinal in 2015

=== Coadjutor bishops ===
- Guillaume Douarre, S.M. (1842-1847), as Coadjutor vicar apostolic; did not succeed to see; appointed Vicar Apostolic of Melanesia (in fact Nouvelle-Calédonie, New Caledonia), Pacific (Oceania)
- Aloys Elloy, S.M. (1863-1877), as Coadjutor vicar apostolic
- Armand Olier, S.M. (1903-1906), as Coadjutor vicar apostolic
- Patelisio Punou-Ki-Hihifo Finau, S.M. (1971-1972)
- Soane Patita Paini Mafi (2007-2008); future Cardinal

== See also ==
- List of Catholic dioceses in Oceania
