= Teone Church =

- Teone Church
- 08°31′16″S 179°11′54″E
- Location: Vaiaku
- Country: Tuvalu
- Denomination: Roman Catholic Church

The Teone Church also alternatively known as the Catholic Church of Teone or the Catholic Centre of Teone, is a religious building in Vaiaku on the south coast of Fongafale in the atoll of Funafuti, which is the economic center of Tuvalu in Oceania.

== Background ==
Despite its small size it is the main Catholic church in Tuvalu. The diocese was established on 10 September 1982. It follows the Roman or Latin liturgical rites, and it depends on the Mission Sui Iuris of Funafuti (Missio sui iuris Funafutina), affiliated with the Congregation for the Evangelization of Peoples. A mission sui iuris is established by the church to care for a community, generally in a remote place, with a very small number of Catholics - both of which are applicable to Tuvalu. The church was previously a suffragan of the Archdiocese of Samoa-Apia until March 2003, when it became suffragan of the Metropolitan Archdiocese of Suva. The Archbishop responsible for the diocese is currently Archbishop Peter Loy Chong, who was appointed on 19 December 2012. In 2023, Pope Francis placed the church under the pastoral responsibility of Father Eliseo Napiere MSP, who is a missionary from the Philippines. Father Napiere succeeded Reynaldo Getalado as the church's priest. Getalado went on to become Bishop of the Roman Catholic Diocese of Rarotonga, in the Cook Islands.

In 2020, estimates suggested that there were 95-100 Catholics in Tuvalu, with one priest. The number of Catholics is equal to approximately 1% of the population of Tuvalu.
