= Stuart O'Connell =

New Zealand Catholic bishop (1935–2019)

The Most Reverend Stuart O'Connell
- 5th Bishop of Rarotonga
- Installed: 22 February 1996
- Term ended: April 2011
- Predecessor: Robin Leamy
- Successor: Paul Donoghue

Personal details
- Born: Stuart France O'Connell; 11 May 1935 Lower Hutt, New Zealand
- Died: 2 August 2019 (aged 84) Auckland, New Zealand
- Denomination: Roman Catholic Church
- Motto: Fortitudo et fides (Fortitude and faith)

Stuart France O'Connell (11 May 1935 – 2 August 2019) was the fifth Catholic Bishop of Rarotonga (1996–2011).

== Early life ==
O'Connell was born on 11 May 1935 in Lower Hutt. He completed his education at St. Patrick's College, Silverstream in 1953 and in 1954 entered Mount St Mary’s Seminary. He was professed as a member of the Society of Mary on 11 February 1956, at Mt St Mary's Seminary, Greenmeadows, where his final profession took place in February 1959 and he was ordained a subdeacon in December 1959.

== Priesthood ==
O'Connell joined the deaconate in February 1960 and became a priest at Saints Peter and Paul Church, Lower Hutt, on 27 July 1960. He moved to Chanel College, Moamoa, Samoa in 1966 to work as a teacher, and after another period teaching and studying in New Zealand, he returned, in 1975, to Chanel College as Rector where he stayed until 1982.

In 1983 and 1984 he completed his MA at Catholic University of America. From 1985 to 1986, he taught at Mount St Mary’s Seminary, Greenmeadows. From 1986 to 1991, he was Vicar Provincial, and from 1992 to 1996 he was Provincial of the New Zealand Province of the Society of Mary.

== Episcopacy ==
On 8 November 1995, O'Connell was appointed the Bishop of Rarotonga and was consecrated by Bishop Leamy SM, Cardinal Williams and Bishop Soane Lilo Foliaki SM, Bishop of Tonga, in St Joseph's Cathedral, Avarua, on 22 February 1996.

He oversaw a growing Roman Catholic population (by 2011 in excess of 3,000 in a total population of about 20,000 – mainly due to immigration from the Philippines and Fiji) with a complement of only seven priests (five on Rarotonga at Avarua, Matavera, Titikaveka and Arorangi and one each on Aitutaki, Atiu, and Mauke (islands). He was able to obtain priests from overseas and to augment the number of local-born priests. He was able to keep open and refurbish the Catholic schools (Nukutere College, Saint Mary's School, Mauke Island and St Joseph's School, Avarua). During his tenure teacher pay parity was achieved for teachers in those schools, so that the Cook Islands Government paid them at the same rates as their counterparts in other schools. O'Connell retired in April 2011.

O'Connell died in Auckland on 2 August 2019, after a battle with cancer.

Catholic Church titles
Preceded by Robin Leamy SM	5th Bishop of Rarotonga; 1996–2011	Succeeded by Paul Donoghue SM
