= Mission sui iuris of Funafuti =

Latin Catholic missionary jurisdiction in Tuvalu

Mission sui iuris of Funafuti Missio sui iuris Funafutina

Location
- Country: Tuvalu
- Metropolitan: Archdiocese of Suva
- Headquarters: Christ the King Catholic Church

Statistics
- Area: 26 km^{2} (10 sq mi)
- Population: Total; Catholics: (as of 2023); ▲11,000; 100 ( 0.9%)
- Parishes: 1
- Churches: 1

Information
- Denomination: Catholic Church
- Sui iuris church: Latin Church
- Rite: Roman Rite
- Established: 10 September 1982
- Secular priests: 1

Current leadership
- Ecclesiastical Superior: Msgr. Eliseo Napiere, M.S.P.

The Mission sui iuris of Funafuti (Latin: Missio sui iuris Funafutina) is a Latin Catholic mission sui iuris (pre-diocesan missionary jurisdiction) in Tuvalu.

It depends on the Dicastery for Evangelization, yet it is exceptionally not exempt, serving instead as a suffragan of a metropolitan archdiocese. Since 21 March 2003, its metropolitan see has been the Archdiocese of Suva; before that, it was suffragan to the Archdiocese of Samoa-Apia.

Its sole place of worship is Christ the King Roman Catholic Church (commonly known as Teone Church) in Vaiaku, on Fongafale island.

On 3 June 2024, Pope Francis appointed Mission Society of the Philippines priest Fr. Eliseo Napiere, M.S.P., as Ecclesiastical Superior of the Mission sui iuris of Funafuti. He succeeded Reynaldo B. Getalado, M.S.P., who had led the mission since 2014 prior to becoming coadjutor bishop of the Diocese of Rarotonga.

== History ==
During the Colonial Era, the Ellice Islands (now Tuvalu), having very few Catholics, were administered with the Gilbert Islands as a protectorate and later as the Gilbert and Ellice Islands colony from 1916. The Vicariate Apostolic of the Gilbert Islands became the Diocese of Tarawa in 1966 (and was renamed the Diocese of Tarawa, Nauru and Funafuti in 1978).

On 10 September 1982, Pope John Paul II split the territory into the Diocese of Tarawa and Nauru and the separate Mission sui iuris of Funafuti. Since 2014, pastoral care of the mission has been given to priests of the Mission Society of the Philippines (M.S.P.), assisted by local laity.

== Ecclesiastical Superiors ==
- Pio Taofinu'u, S.M. (10 September 1982 – September 1985)
- John Hubert Macey Rodgers, S.M. (7 August 1985 – 14 July 1986)
- Camille DesRosiers, S.M. (14 July 1986 – 24 September 2010)
- John Ikataere Rarikin, M.S.C. (24 September 2010 – 8 February 2014)
- Reynaldo B. Getalado, M.S.P. (24 February 2014 – 27 April 2024)
- Eliseo Napiere, M.S.P. (3 June 2024 – present)

== Demographics and statistics ==
Because Tuvalu is predominantly Protestant, Catholics form a small minority of under 1% of the country's inhabitants. In 2020, there were roughly 100 Catholics across the islands, served by a single resident priest.

Year	Catholics	Total population	% Catholic	Priests	Parishes	Ref.
1990	110	9,000	1.2%	1	1	
2000	110	▲9,500	▼1.1%	1	1	
2010	▲115	▲10,000	1.1%	1	1	
2020	▼100	▲10,500	▼0.9%	1	1	
2023	100	▲11,000	0.9%	1	1	

== See also ==
- Religion in Tuvalu

== Sources and external links ==
- GCatholic, with incumbent bio links
- "Mission "Sui Iuris" of Funafuti". Catholic-Hierarchy.
- Father Eliseo Napiere, M.S.P.
