= List of cathedrals in Fiji =

This is a list of cathedrals in Fiji sorted by denomination.

== Anglican ==
The following cathedrals of the Anglican Church in Aotearoa, New Zealand and Polynesia are located in Fiji:

- Holy Trinity Cathedral in Suva

== Catholic ==
Cathedrals of the Catholic Church in Fiji:

- Sacred Heart Cathedral in Suva
