= St Patrick's College, Silverstream =

Location
- 207 Fergusson Drive; Silverstream New Zealand; 41°8′41.84″S 175°0′46.80″E

Information
- Type: Integrated Boys' Secondary (Years 9–13) (Catholic)
- Motto: Sectare Fidem ("Hold Fast to your Faith")
- Established: 1931; 95 years ago
- Ministry of Education Institution no.: 252
- Rector: Robert Ferreira
- Enrolment: 750 (July 2026)
- Socio-economic decile: 7
- Founded by: The Society of Mary
- Website: stream.school.nz

St Patrick's College is a state-integrated Catholic boys' day and boarding secondary school located in Silverstream, Upper Hutt, New Zealand. It was established in 1931 when the original St Patrick's College, Wellington that had been established in 1885 was intended to be moved to a larger site more suited to a boarding school, but both colleges survived as independent institutions.

== History ==
St Patrick's College in Silverstream was established by the Society of Mary (Marist Fathers) in 1931 when the original St Patrick's College, Wellington (established 1885) was intended to be moved to a larger site more suited to a boarding school. Both colleges survived. Today, they share not only a common history, motto and spirit but also a good natured rivalry and competition in many endeavours. Silverstreamers refer to the mother school as 'Town'.

The Silverstream College, often referred to simply by the suburb title or 'Stream', is on seven hectares of grounds between the Hutt River and Silverstream Railway Station close to the suburbs of Silverstream and Heretaunga. As a state-integrated school, St Patrick's College is funded by the Society of Mary, Catholic Schools Board Limited and the New Zealand Government.

In the 1980s, St Patrick's record was marred by a member of staff being involved in incidents of sexual abuse involving students. Reports of this sexual abuse were allegedly suppressed by the school Marist priests.

At its foundation much of the original College was transferred from the Wellington site including many of the Marist teachers, much of the memorabilia and the College colours. The brother Colleges today share an Old Boys' Association in recognition of their common heritage. School sports teams have enjoyed success in Rugby union, cricket and athletics. Football, hockey and basketball are popular winter sports at the college. Both of St Patrick's Colleges also compete against each other in an annual event called “McEvedy” similar to the athletics of Old Boys but it is shared with two other schools, Wellington College and Rongotai College. Over the years of the College it has evolved from being primarily a boarding school into a largely day school with a small boarding facility. This demographic shift has resulted from several pressures including the huge increase in the number of residents in the local area. In more recent years it has been necessary to cap the roll and introduce an enrolment scheme to ensure an equitable educational outcome for all local pupils. The College celebrated its 75th Jubilee in 2006.

As a Catholic school St Patrick's College bases its educational philosophy on Christian teachings and on the Marist tradition under which the school was founded. In 2012 the St Patrick's College, Silverstream Foundation was established.

== Demographics ==
At the October 2011 Education Review Office (ERO) review, St Patrick's Silverstream had 712 students enrolled. Sixty-six percent of students identified as European (Pākehā), 14 percent identified as Māori, ten percent as Pasifika five percent as Asian, and five percent as another ethnicity.

St Patrick's Silverstream has a socio-economic decile of 8 (step P), meaning it draws its school community from areas of moderately-high socioeconomic status when compared to other New Zealand schools. The school was recategorised from decile 9 (step Q) in January 2015, as part of the nationwide review of deciles following the 2013 census.

== Notable alumni (old Patricians or Silverstreamers) ==
The college encourages former students to join the St. Patrick's College Old Boys Association (SPCOBA). The Association is based in Wellington and caters for Old Boys of both the Silverstream and Town colleges. Notable Old Silverstreamers include (with years attending the college in parentheses where available):

=== Academia ===
- Antony F. Campbell (1934–2020) – Jesuit priest, Old Testament scholar
- Michael King - Historian (1945–2004)

=== The Arts ===
- Patrick Power – opera singer
- Vincent Ward – cinematographer
- Tapiwa Mutingwende (TAPZ) – musician
- Andrew Johnston – poet

=== Broadcasting ===
- Martin Devlin – sports journalist and broadcaster
- Mark Sainsbury, (1970–1974) – broadcaster
- Spiro Zavos, (1951–1955) – journalist and author

=== Business ===
- Michael Fay – financier
- Pat Goodman – co-founder Goodman Fielder Wattie

=== Politics and public service ===
- Mark O'Regan, – New Zealand Supreme Court Judge
- Tufuga Efi, Tupua Tamasese Tupuola Tufuga Efi – former Prime Minister and head of state of Samoa
- Bill English, (1975–1979) – 39th Prime Minister of New Zealand
- Wayne Guppy, (1968–1972) – Mayor of Upper Hutt
- Rex S Kirton, (1955–1959) – Mayor of Upper Hutt
- Mike Minogue, (1940–1942) – Mayor of Hamilton

=== Religion ===
- Wiremu Te Awhitu, (1932–35) – first Māori Catholic priest
- Owen Dolan, (1942–1944) – Coadjutor Bishop emeritus of Palmerston North
- Robin Leamy, (1947–1951) – Bishop of Rarotonga (1984–1996); Auxiliary Bishop of Auckland (1996– )
- Stuart France O'Connell, (1935–2019) (at college 1949–1953) – Fifth Catholic Bishop of Rarotonga (1996–2011)
- John Rodgers CMG SM (1915 – 1997) - Missionary bishop.

=== Science ===
- John Daniel Bergin, (1933–1937) – neurologist and Second World War veteran (b 1921 d 1995)

=== Sport ===
- Blair Cowan, (1999–2003) – Scotland rugby international (2014–)
- Dylan Hayes, Top 14 rugby union player
- Patrick Hogan, KNZM, CBE – Racehorse trainer and breeder
- Joe Karam (1964–1968) – All Black (1972–75) 10 tests
- Harry Dale Kent, (1960–1963) – world champion cyclist, Gold Medalist 1970 Commonwealth Games, 1970 NZ Sportsman of the Year
- Earle Kirton – All Black (1963–1970), 13 tests
- John Leslie, (1984–1988) – Otago and Scotland rugby union player
- Martin Leslie, (1985–1989) – rugby union player, Scotland national team
- Simon Mannix, (1985–1989) – All Black (1994) 1 test
- Ross Nesdale, (1981–1984) – rugby union player, Ireland 13 tests
- TP O’Sullivan, (1960-1962) – All Black 4 tests, 16 games
- Marko Stamenić, (2015–2019) – football player, New Zealand national team
- Aaron Persico (1992–1996) – rugby union player, Italy national team
- Scott Waldrom, (1994–1998) – All Black (2008)
- Thomas Waldrom, (1996–2000) – England Rugby Test Player (2012)
- Tyrel Lomax, (2009–2010) – All Black (2020–)
- Asafo Aumua, (2010–2014) – All Black (2020–)

== List of rectors ==
The school Principal of the college is called the Rector.

- Very Rev. Father John W Dowling, SM, MA, AFRES (1931–1937)
- Very Rev. Father John J Kennedy, SM, MA (1938–1943)
- Very Rev. Father Leo R Evatt, SM, BA, QSM (1944–1949)
- Very Rev. Father Francis A Durning, SM, MA (1950–1955), mentioned in the NZ Royal Commission of Inquiry into Abuse in Care hearings in Nov. 2020
- Very Rev. Father Maurice Bourke, SM, BA (1956–1961)
- Very Rev. Father John R Parker SM, MA (1962–1966)
- Very Rev. Father Kevin A O'Conner SM, BSc ANZIC (1967)
- Very Rev. Father Gerard P Gill, SM BA (1968–1970)
- Very Rev. Father Patrick F Minto SM, BA (1971–1974), mentioned in the NZ Royal Commission of Inquiry into Abuse in Care hearings in Nov. 2020
- Very Rev. Father Frederick M Bliss SM, MA (CUA), BA (Vic), LTCL (1974–1980)
- Very Rev. Father Michael V Curtain, SM, BA (1981–1987)
- Very Rev. Father James T Dooley, SM, BA, BSc (1987–1993)
- Mr. David P Leavy, BA, BEd (Liverpool), DipEd (1994–2006)
- Mr. Philip Mahoney, BSc, PGDip Theol&Spir, MEdL (2006–2010) – Resigned from Ordained Ministry prior to appointment
- Mr. Gerard Tully, BPhED, BSc, Dip Tchg (2011–2017)
- Mr. Graham Duffy, B.A. Dip Tchg (2018–2021)
- Mr. Steve Bryan, (Acting Rector February–May 2022)
- Mr. Robert Ferreira, (May 2022 – Present)
