= St. Joseph's Cathedral, Avarua =

Coordinates: 21.2056°S 159.7810°W

St. Joseph's Cathedral
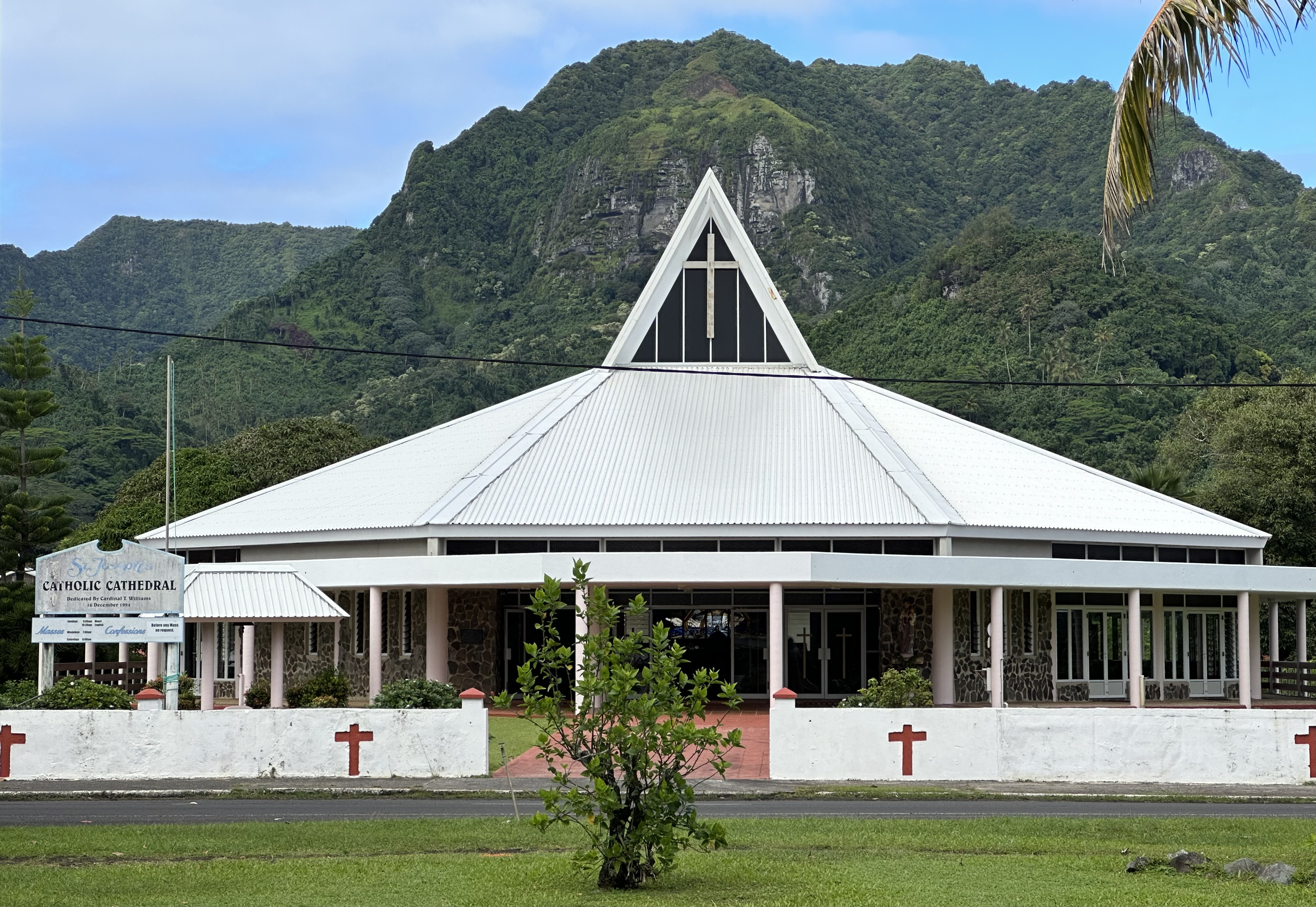
- St. Joseph's Cathedral
- Location: Avarua
- Country: Cook Islands; New Zealand
- Denomination: Roman Catholic Church

History
- Dedication: 1994

Clergy
- Bishop: Reynaldo Getalado

St. Joseph's Cathedral is the cathedral of the Bishop of Rarotonga and is located in Avarua in the north of the island of Rarotonga the largest and most populated island of the Cook Islands a self-governing island country in the South Pacific Ocean in free association with New Zealand The cathedral was dedicated in 1994 by Cardinal T Williams, Archbishop of Wellington.

The cathedral is the mother church of the Catholic Diocese of Rarotonga (Dioecesis Rarotongana) which has jurisdiction over the Cook Islands and Niue and which was created as an apostolic prefecture in 1922 being elevated to its present status in 1966 by The bull "Prophetarum voces" of Pope Paul VI.

It is under the pastoral responsibility of Bishop Reynaldo Getalado, M.S.P. (appointed in 2024). Inside, there are stained glass windows depicting scenes and people from the Bible.

For some years negotiations took place between the Church and the landowners (with the involvement of the government of the Cook Islands government) for the continued occupation of the cathedral site which was subject to a lease. An agreement was finally concluded in 2018 which resulted in the "warranting of the land". The agreement also benefited nearby Nukutere College.

== See also ==
- Reynaldo Getalado
- Roman Catholic Diocese of Rarotonga
- Nukutere College
- Paul Donoghue
- Roman Catholicism in New Zealand
