= Patrick Edward O'Connor =

New Zealand prelate

- Ecclesiastical Superior of Tokelau
- Archdiocese: Roman Catholic Archdiocese of Samoa-Apia
- Diocese: Roman Catholic Mission Sui Iuris of Tokelau
- Installed: 26 June 1992
- Term ended: 6 May 2011
- Predecessor: New Creation
- Successor: Rev. Oliver P. Aro, MSP
- Previous post: Parish priest in Tokelau (1987-1992)

Orders
- Ordination: 16 July 1957
- Rank: Monsignor

Personal details
- Born: 8 March 1932 Masterton, New Zealand
- Died: 3 December 2014 (aged 82) Silverstream, New Zealand
- Denomination: Roman Catholic
- Education: Holy Cross college in Mosgiel

Monsignor Patrick Edward O'Connor (8 March 1932 − 3 December 2014) was a Roman Catholic priest who served as the Ecclesiastical Superior of the Roman Catholic Mission Sui Iuris of Tokelau from 1992 to 2011.

== Life ==
O'Connor was born in Masterton, New Zealand. was educated at the local St Patrick's primary school and St Joseph's College, Masterton. He studied for the priesthood at Holy Name Seminary, Christchurch and Holy Cross College, Mosgiel. He was ordained for the Roman Catholic Archdiocese of Wellington in 1957 and served in a number of parishes in the Wellington Archdiocese.

Catholic Church titles
Preceded by New Creation	Ecclesiastical Superior of Tokelau; 1992–2011	Succeeded by Oliver Pugoy Aro, MSP
