= Alapati Lui Mataeliga =

Samoan Roman Catholic bishop (1953–2023)

His Excellency, The Most Reverend Alapati Lui Mataeliga
- Archbishop of Samoa-Apia; Ecclesiastical Superior of Tokelau
- Archdiocese: Samoa-Apia
- Appointed: 16 November 2002
- Installed: 3 January 2003
- Term ended: 25 April 2023
- Predecessor: Pio Taofinu'u
- Successor: Mosese Vitolio Tui SBD

Orders
- Ordination: 5 July 1977 by Pio Taofinu'u
- Consecration: 3 January 2003 by Patrick Coveney, Petero Mataca, and Soane Lilo Foliaki

Personal details
- Born: 4 January 1953 Sataua, Western Samoa Trust Territory (now Samoa)
- Died: 25 April 2023 (aged 70) Auckland, New Zealand
- Parents: Lauiliu Utu Vaoliko Mata'eliga (mother) and Vaoliko Sui Panitaleo Mata'eliga (father)

Styles of Alapati Lui Mataeliga
- Reference style: His Excellency; The Most Reverend
- Spoken style: Your Excellency
- Religious style: Archbishop

Alapati Lui Mataeliga (4 January 1953 – 25 April 2023) was the Roman Catholic Archbishop of Samoa-Apia and Ecclesiastical Superior of the Mission sui iuris of Tokelau from 2002 until his death in 2023.

Alapati was born in Sataua on the island of Savai'i. He was educated at Sataua Primary School and Chanel College before attending the Catholic Theological Seminary in Fiji. He was ordained for the presbyterate of the Diocese of Samoa and Tokelau on 5 July 1977, becoming the youngest Samoan to be ordained as a priest. He initially served as a vicar in Fagatogo, American Samoa, before serving briefly as parish priest. After two years teaching at the seminary in Fiji, he returned to Fagatogo, where he was parish priest until 1992. Upon the retirement of Cardinal Pio Taofinu'u, Father Mataeliga was appointed by the Holy See as the second Archbishop of Samoa-Apia on 16 November 2002. He was consecrated to the episcopate and installed as ordinary by Archbishop Patrick Coveney, Apostolic Nuncio to Samoa, on 3 January 2003.

He participated in the 1994 Tumua and Pule protest marches against the Samoan government's Value Added and Goods and Services Tax, at one stage taking lead of a march to deter violence by the government.

On 31 May 2021, during the 2021 Samoan constitutional crisis, Alapati denounced the caretaker prime minister Tuilaepa Aiono Sailele Malielegaoi for ignoring the courts and refusing to yield power. In the aftermath of the crisis, when the FAST government was refusing to allow opposition MPs to be sworn into parliament, Alapati performed an ifoga outside the Legislative Assembly of Samoa in order to seek peace.

Mataeliga died in Auckland, New Zealand on 25 April 2023, at the age of 70.

Catholic Church titles
Preceded by Pio Taofinu'u	Archbishop of Samoa-Apia; 2003–2023	Succeeded by Mosese Vitolio Tui

Catholic Church titles
Preceded by Oliver Pugoy Aro, MSP	Ecclesiastical Superior of Tokelau; 2015-2023	Succeeded by Mosese Vitolio Tui
