= Camille DesRosiers =

Canadian-born Roman Catholic priest

Camille DesRosiers S.M.
- Ecclesiastical Superior of the Mission Sui Iuris of Funafuti
- Archdiocese: Roman Catholic Archdiocese of Suva
- Diocese: Roman Catholic Mission Sui Iuris of Funafuti
- Installed: 14 July 1986
- Term ended: 24 September 2010
- Predecessor: John Rodgers
- Successor: John Ikataere Rarikin

Orders
- Ordination: 4 June 1955
- Rank: Priest

Personal details
- Born: 14 October 1928 Grand-Métis, Quebec, Canada
- Died: 16 May 2016 (aged 87) St Augustin, Quebec, Canada
- Denomination: Roman Catholic

Father Camille DesRosiers, SM (14 October 1928 − 16 May 2016) was a Canadian-born Roman Catholic priest who served as the Ecclesiastical Superior of the Mission Sui Iuris of Funafuti from 1986 to 2010.

DesRosiers was born in Grand-Métis, Quebec, Canada. At a young age, he joined an Institute of Consecrated Life, the Society of Mary (Marists), professed on 8 September 1950 and ordained as priest on 4 June 1955. After ordination in served in Samoa, American Samoa and on Nukunonu in Tokelau. In November 1985 he was asked to introduce Bishop John Rodgers to the people of Tuvalu as the new Ecclesiastical Superior. When Rodgers retired due to ill-health in 1986, DesRosiers was appointed to replace him. He spent 25 years in Tuvalu, before retiring in 2011.

Catholic Church titles
Preceded by John Rodgers S.M.	Superior of the Mission, Funafuti, Tuvalu; 1986-2010	Succeeded by John Ikataere Rarikin M.S.C.
