= Robin Leamy =

Robin Leamy may refer to:

- Robin Leamy (bishop) (1934–2022), New Zealand Roman Catholic bishop
- Robin Leamy (swimmer) (born 1961), American former swimmer
