= Vitolio =

Vitolio is a name. Notable people with the name include:

- Vitolio Tipotio (born 1975), French track and field athlete
- Mosese Vitolio Tui (born 1961), Samoan priest
