= John Rodgers (bishop) =

Catholic missionary in New Zealand (1915–1997)

John Rodgers S.M.
- Bishop of Rarotonga
- Church: Catholic Church
- Diocese: Diocese of Rarotonga
- In office: 1 March 1973 – 21 March 1977
- Predecessor: Hendrick Joseph Cornelius Maria de Cocq
- Successor: Denis Browne
- Other post: Titular Bishop of Nigizubi (1977–1997)
- Previous posts: Superior of the mission sui iuris of Funafuti (1985–1986); Auxiliary Bishop of Auckland (1977–1985); Titular Bishop of Caput Cilla (1972–1973); Apostolic Administrator of Rarotonga (1971–1973); Bishop of Tonga (1966–1972); Vicar Apostolic of Tonga and Niue Islands (1957–1966); Titular Bishop of Sbida(1953–1966); Vicar Apostolic of Tonga Islands (1953–1957)

Orders
- Ordination: December 1940
- Consecration: 11 February 1954 by Peter McKeefry

Personal details
- Born: 9 October 1915 Upper Hutt, Hutt County, Dominion of New Zealand, British Empire
- Died: 10 January 1997 (aged 81) Auckland, New Zealand

John Hubert Macey Rodgers CMG SM (9 October 1915 – 10 January 1997) was a Missionary bishop. He was Vicar Apostolic of Tonga and Niue (1953–1966) Bishop of Tonga (1966–1973) then Bishop of Rarotonga (1973–1977), Auxiliary Bishop of Auckland (1977–1985), Superior of the Mission, Funafuti, Tuvalu (1986).

== Biography ==
Rodgers was born in Upper Hutt, New Zealand, on 9 October 1915. After receiving his secondary education at St Patrick's College, Wellington and St Patrick's College, Silverstream, he studied to be a Marist priest at Mt St Mary's Seminary, Greenmeadows.

He was professed in the Society of Mary (Marists) in 1936 and was ordained a priest on 15 December 1940. A year later he went to Tonga and was principal of 'Api Fo'ou College. In 1953 he was appointed Vicar Apostolic of Tonga and was consecrated bishop in St Mary of the Angels, Wellington. Rodgers attended Sessions 1, 3 and 4 of the Vatican II Council.

He became Bishop of Tonga when Tonga was created a diocese in 1966. He resigned the see in 1972 to make way for an indigenous bishop Bishop Patrick Finau. He became Bishop of Rarotonga in 1973. Among his achievements in the Cook Islands, he founded Nukutere College in 1975.

After his resignation from that see, he was appointed Auxiliary Bishop of Auckland to assist Bishop John Mackey.

In the 1979 New Year Honours, Rodgers was appointed a Companion of the Order of St Michael and St George, for services as Roman Catholic bishop in Tonga and the Cook Islands. In 1985 he was appointed superior of the Catholic mission of Funafuti, Tuvalu and Secretary of the Episcopal Conference of the Pacific, but retired to Auckland in 1986 because of ill health.

== Death ==
He died on 10 January 1997, aged 81. He was buried on 14 January 1997 at Kalevalio Cemetery, Ma'ufanga, Tonga.

== Notes ==
Catholic Church titles
Preceded by Joseph-Felix Blanc SM	Vicar Apostolic of Tonga; 1953–1957	Succeeded by New Title
Preceded by New Title	Vicar Apostolic of Tonga and Niue; 1957–1966	Succeeded by New Title
Preceded by New Title	Bishop of Tonga; 1966–1973	Succeeded by Patelisio Punou-Ki-Hihifo Finau
Preceded by Hendrick Joseph Cornelius Maria de Cocq SS.CC.	Bishop of Rarotonga; 1973–1977	Succeeded by Denis Browne (bishop)
Preceded by –	Auxiliary Bishop of Auckland; 1977–1985	Succeeded by –
Preceded by New Title	Superior of the Mission, Funafuti, Tuvalu; 1985–1986	Succeeded by Camille DesRosiers SM
