= Peter Chung (disambiguation) =

Peter Chung (born 1961) is an American animator and director

Peter Chung may also refer to:

- Peter Chung Hoan Ting (born 1928), Chinese metropolitan archbishop of the Roman Catholic Archdiocese of Kuching
- Peter Chung Soon-taick (born 1961), South Korean prelate of the Catholic Church

== See also ==
- Peter Chong (disambiguation), various people
