= Oliver Pugoy Aro =

Filipino priest

Oliver Pugoy Aro MSP
- Superior Emeritus of Tokelau
- Church: Catholic Church
- See: Mission sui iuris of Tokelau
- In office: 6 May 2011 – 2015
- Predecessor: Patrick Edward O'Connor
- Successor: Alapati Lui Mataeliga

Orders
- Ordination: 2 January 1997

Personal details
- Born: 10 October 1961 (age 64) Pagadian, Zamboanga del Sur, Philippines

Oliver Pugoy Aro MSP (born 10 October 1961 in Pagadian City, Philippines) is a Filipino religious priest who is Ecclesiastical Superior Emeritus of the Mission sui iuris of Tokelau in Tokelau.

== Life ==
Oliver P. Aro joined the Mission Society of the Philippines and was ordained a priest on 2 January 1997. He then worked as a missionary in Papua New Guinea and New Zealand. Pope Benedict XVI appointed him Ecclesiastical Superior of Tokelau on 6 May 2011. Aro's inauguration took place on 2 October of the same year. He held the office of Ecclesiastical Superior until 2015. From 2021 he was Parish Priest, Mary Immaculate Parish, Quakers Hill-Schofields, Sydney, New South Wales.

Catholic Church titles
Preceded by Patrick Edward O'Connor	Ecclesiastical Superior of Tokelau; 2011-2015	Succeeded by Alapati Lui Mataeliga
