= Chanel College, Masterton =

Private school in Masterton, New Zealand

Chanel College

Location
- 26 Herbert Street; Masterton 5810; New Zealand; 40.9602°S 175.6539°E

Information
- Funding type: State integrated
- Motto: All through Christ
- Religious affiliation: Catholic
- Established: 1978; 48 years ago
- Ministry of Education Institution no.: 244
- Principal: Myra Coley
- Years offered: 7–13
- Gender: Coeduational
- Enrolment: 342 (July 2026)
- Socio-economic decile: 5M
- Website: chanelcollege.school.nz

Chanel College, Masterton is a Catholic secondary school situated in Masterton, New Zealand. The school is named after St Peter Chanel, who was a French Marist priest killed on the Pacific island of Futuna in 1841. The school was established in 1978. It resulted from the amalgamation of two schools, St Joseph's College for Boys (founded in 1945) operated by the Marist Brothers and St Bride's College for Girls which had been established in 1898 by the Brigidine Sisters. The College, which is located on the old St Joseph's College site, became a State-integrated school in November 1981. It is owned by the Wellington Archdiocese with the Archbishop of Wellington being named as its proprietor in the college's integration agreement with the New Zealand Government.

== Alumni ==
Ex-pupils of Chanel College or its predecessor schools, St Bride's College and St Joseph's College.

- Barry Barclay, MNZM (1944–2008), Māori filmmaker and writer (Ngāti Apa)
- Marty Berry (born 1966), All Black in 1986 and 1993
- Phillipa "Pip" Brown (born 1979), singer-songwriter and multi-instrumentalist (known as Ladyhawke)
- John Atcherley Cardinal Dew (born 1948), 6th Archbishop of Wellington (2005–2023)
- Kieran McAnulty (born 1985), New Zealand Labour Party MP
- Patrick Edward O'Connor (1932–2014), Monsignor; Catholic priest; Ecclesiastical Superior of the Roman Catholic Mission Sui Iuris of Tokelau (1992–2011)
- Liz Perry (born 1987), New Zealand cricketer and international hockey player
- Paul Quinn (born 1951), businessman, former rugby union player and Member of Parliament for the National Party

== Sources ==
- Claire Hills (ed), The story of Catholic education in the Wairarapa: 50th Jubilee, 25–27 August 1995: St. Joseph's College, Chanel College, St. Joseph's Golden Jubilee Committee, Masterton, New Zealand 1995.
- Helena M Fouhy, One love, many faces : Brigidines in New Zealand, 1898–1998, Congregation of St Brigid, Masterton 1998.
- Pat Gallagher, The Marist Brothers in New Zealand Fiji & Samoa 1876–1976, New Zealand Marist Brothers' Trust Board, Tuakau, 1976.
- Michael King, God's farthest outpost : a history of Catholics in New Zealand, Viking, Auckland 1997.
- Michael O'Meeghan S.M., Steadfast in hope : the story of the Catholic Archdiocese of Wellington 1850–2000, Dunmore press, Palmerston North, 2003.
