= John David Hubaldus Lehman =

Dutch priest

John David Hubaldus Lehman SSCC
- Vicar Apostolic of Cook Islands
- Church: Catholic Church
- See: Vicariate Apostolic of Cook Islands
- In office: 30 June 1939 – 24 April 1959
- Predecessor: Bernardin Castanié
- Successor: Hendrick Joseph Cornelius Maria de Cocq
- Other post: Titular Bishop of Sertei (1948-1967)

Orders
- Ordination: 26 July 1914
- Consecration: 18 April 1948 by James Liston

Personal details
- Born: 2 January 1887 Amstelveen, North Holland, Netherlands
- Died: 16 January 1967 (aged 80) Amsterdam, Netherlands

John David Hubaldus Lehman (born in 1887 in Amstelveen) was a Dutch clergyman and bishop for the Roman Catholic Diocese of Rarotonga. He was appointed bishop in 1939. He died in 1967.
