= Pio Taofinuʻu =

Samoan Catholic cardinal (1923–2006)

His Eminence Pio Taofinuʻu S.M.
- Cardinal, Archbishop Emeritus of Samoa-Apia
- See: Roman Catholic Archdiocese of Samoa-Apia
- Installed: September 10, 1982
- Term ended: November 16, 2002
- Predecessor: George Hamilton Pearce
- Successor: Alapati Lui Mataeliga

Orders
- Ordination: December 8, 1954
- Consecration: May 29, 1968
- Created cardinal: March 5, 1973

Personal details
- Born: December 8, 1923 Falealupo, Savai'i Samoa
- Died: January 19, 2006 (aged 82) Samoa
- Buried: Mulivai, Apia Samoa

Styles of Pio Taofinuʻu
- Reference style: His Eminence
- Spoken style: Your Eminence
- Informal style: Cardinal
- See: Samoa-Apia

Pio Taofinuʻu, S.M. (December 8, 1923 – January 19, 2006) was a Catholic cardinal and Archbishop of Samoa-Apia. Born in the village of Falealupo on the island of Savai'i in Samoa, he was the first Polynesian bishop and cardinal. He was made a Cardinal by Pope Paul VI in the Consistory of 5 March 1973, of the Title of St. Onofrio (St. Humphrey). His father was Taofinuʻu Solomona and his mother, Mau.

== Education ==
Taofinuʻu was born on December 8, 1923, in Falealupo on Savaiʻi island's west coast and attended the village catechism school before entering Moamoa Theological College. He continued his studies first at the Seminary of Lano, on Wallis Island and later at the Society of Mary (Marists) Seminary in Greenmeadows (near Napier, in New Zealand).

He was ordained a priest for the Society of Mary (Marists) on December 8, 1954, by Bishop Giovanni Battista Dieter, S.M. He made his profession in the Society of Mary on September 8, 1962.

== Priesthood ==
After ordination, Taofinuʻu worked at Leauvaʻa and Palauli district in Samoa, before going to New York and later returning to Samoa in 1962. Father Taofinuʻu accompanied Bishop George Hamilton Pearce, S.M., the then Bishop of Apia (which was later to become the Archdiocese of Samoa-Apia) to the Second Vatican Council in Rome. He remained in Rome for three months, taking advantage of his time overseas to visit the Holy Land. After serving as Vicar to Bishop Pearce from 1964, Father Taofinuʻu became Vicar General of the diocese in 1966.

== Bishop ==
On January 11, 1968, he was named Bishop of Apia, becoming the first Polynesian bishop in history. He was consecrated as Bishop of Apia, Samoa by his former bishop George Pearce, who was the new archbishop of Suva, Fiji. One of his first duties as the new spiritual leader of Samoa's Catholic community was as one of the organizers of Pope Paul VI's November 30, 1970, visit to the Samoan Islands – the first and, to date, the only visit by a Pope. During his time as Bishop of Apia, Catholic schools increased as he put an important focus on education throughout his diocese. He established a Theological College for Catechists and Deacons in an effort to evangelize the Faith to all the islands. His work contributed greatly to an increase in priestly vocations in Samoa. As bishop, Taofinuʻu was active in leading the reforms within the Catholic Church in Samoa in which some aspects of Samoan culture were blended with the existing practices.

== Archbishop and cardinal ==
Taofinuʻu was created a cardinal by Pope Paul VI in the consistory of March 5, 1973. He participated in the 1978 papal conclaves of August, and October. He became the first Archbishop of Samoa-Apia, when the Diocese of Samoa-Apia and Tokelau (as it was then), was elevated to the rank of archdiocese.

== Liturgical reform ==
Cardinal Taofinuʻu presided over the first Synod of the Archdiocese of Samoa-Apia, which began on December 7, 1990, and ended on December 14, 1990. After careful discussion and consideration, Taofinuʻu approved six synodal acts from his Commission on Worship, Sacraments and Inculturation.The second of these six acts states "O le faaaganuuga o le Tapuaiga auaufaatasi i le Puleaga Faaakiepikopo o Samoa – Apia ia faaauauina le tilotilo toto‘a i ai ma le toe iloiloinaina ma o lona faatinoga ia lanutasia i le puleaga atoa" or "[t]he inculturation of the Liturgy in the Archdiocese of Samoa – Apia is to be continually reviewed and reevaluated, and its implementation should be uniform through the archdiocese." As a result of these acts, the liturgies in the archdiocese were vibrant, become more meaningful to the people by making use of the signs and cultural symbols of the people of Samoa. During his episcopate, a new hymnal incorporating old and new hymns for the liturgy was also prepared and published for use through the ecclesiastical province of Samoa-Apia.

== Retirement and death ==
He retired as cardinal on November 16, 2002, at the age of 79, and died in Apia shortly after midnight on January 19, 2006, at the age of 82. His death was announced during a session of Parliament in Samoa while the Senate in American Samoa observed a moment of silence. He is buried in the cathedral of the Immaculate Conception, in Mulivai village, Apia.
