= John Ikataere =

John Ikataere MSC
- Ecclesiastical Superior of the Mission sui iuris of Funafuti
- Archdiocese: Roman Catholic Archdiocese of Suva
- Diocese: Roman Catholic Mission Sui Iuris of Funafuti
- Installed: 24 September 2010
- Term ended: 8 February 2014
- Predecessor: Camille DesRosiers
- Successor: Reynaldo B. Getalado

Orders
- Ordination: 30 September 1972
- Rank: Priest

Personal details
- Born: 5 January 1944 Butaritari, Gilbert and Ellice Islands
- Died: 8 February 2014 (aged 70) Suva, Fiji
- Denomination: Roman Catholic
- Education: St Peter Channel Seminary in Ulapia

Father John Ikataere Rarikin, M.S.C. (5 January 1944 − 8 February 2014) was a Roman Catholic priest who served as the Ecclesiastical Superior of the Mission sui iuris of Funafuti from 2010 to 2014.

== Life ==
Rarikin was born in Butaritari, Kiribati. He was the 3rd eldest in a family of 4 boys and 6 girls. In the young age he joined an Institute of Consecrated Life of Missionaries of the Sacred Heart and was ordained as priest on 30 September 1972. Also he studied at Rome in the Gregorian University.

Catholic Church titles
Preceded by Camille DesRosiers S.M.	Superior of the Mission, Funafuti, Tuvalu; 2010–2014	Succeeded by Reynaldo Getalado M.S.P.
