= Nukutere College =

Location
- Avarua, Rarotonga; Cook Islands; 21.2081°S 159.7809°W

Information
- Type: Catholic co-educational secondary school
- Religious affiliation: Roman Catholic
- Denomination: Congregation of Christian Brothers
- Established: 1975; 51 years ago
- Founder: Bishop John Rodgers SM
- Principal: Henrianna Yaqona
- Grades: Year 7 – 11
- Information: PO Box 76, Rarotonga
- Website: www.nukutere.edu.ck

Nukutere College is a Roman Catholic secondary school located in Avarua, Rarotonga, Cook Islands. It is the country’s only Catholic secondary school and has an important educational role across the archipelago. "Nukutere" means "people on a journey", a reference to the pilgrim Church in the South Pacific context. The proprietor of the college is the Bishop of Rarotonga

== Character ==
Students come mainly from Rarotonga, but provision is made for those from outer islands (as well as some from French Polynesia) to stay with 'guardians'. As at 2010, Nukutere College and all other private and church schools in the Cook Islands receive 100% of the equivalent allocation of funds to which they are entitled as a government school from the national budget. All government, private and church schools are required to be open to both educational and financial audit. The college generally has a roll of 170–200 pupils and a staff of 13. In 2007, a government-funded Special Needs unit was opened at the college, the only such unit in Rarotonga.

== Origins ==
The college was opened in 1975 by Bishop John Rodgers SM, Bishop of Rarotonga. It was first staffed by Father Peter Salamonsen SM and Sister Berenice Stevens RSM. The Christian Brothers provided staff for the school from the beginning of the 1976 school year until the end of 2009. Brother Terence Vitus "Terry" McErlane became the second headmaster. Brothers Simon Coughlan and Joseph McRae were the other members of that first Christian Brothers community. For some years Sister Elizabeth Browne-Russell (SJC), a sister of St Joseph of Cluny, served as deputy principal.

From its beginnings, the school's financial position was somewhat parlous especially after it became necessary to employ lay teachers starting in the 1980s. In 2000 the Cook Islands' Government began to pay 75% of teachers' salaries and running costs in all private and church schools. At the same time the schools' principal, Brother Norman Gillies established a charitable trust to ensure a regular supplementary income for future maintenance and development. The Silver Jubilee of the College and the presence of the Christian Brothers was marked in 2000. In 2005, the school had a roll of 190.

On 20 February 2006 part of the school was destroyed by fire. Later that year the block was rebuilt with funds supplied by the New Zealand Government through the Cook Islands Investment Commission (CIIC). The new block was designed by an Auckland architecture firm, Architectus.

In May 2011, a college shrine in honour of Our Lady of Perpetual Help (containing the icon that was in the former chapel of the Christian Brothers) and a plaque honouring all the Brothers who taught at Nukutere College were unveiled on the wall of the new school building, overlooking the college playing field. The refurnished, restocked and computerized school library, named the Edmund Rice Library, was reopened in July 2011.

On Sunday 20 October 2013, a deliberately-lit fire destroyed a classroom block representing two-thirds of the college's teaching space. The block had been rebuilt after the 2006 fire. The director of Religious studies, Sister Lusianna Matai, lost all the teaching resources she had built up. The college was reopened in time for senior students to prepare for their NCEA exams in the second week in November. An emergency appeal for funds to rebuild the school was launched. The difficulties of providing teaching and learning areas for the students and teachers was dealt with in 2014 when the college rented a marquee for the year and in 2015 a movable classroom was built.

Sister Lusianna Matai of the Sisters of St Josephs of Cluny had been director of religious studies at Nukutere College for 10 years when she left the college in 2015. She was succeeded by Mr Iokimi Narovu in 2016.

== Land ==
At the time of the destruction of the classrooms, the school was faced with the expiration in November 2014 of the 1899 lease of the school site. Negotiations took place between the government of the Cook Islands, the school board, the Catholic Church and the landowners for the continued occupation of the land. An agreement was finally concluded in 2018 which resulted in the "warranting of the land". Two separate entities were created: Nukutere College Incorporated – responsible for management of the college and Nukutere Holdings Incorporated – answerable for the management of the land. St. Joseph's Catholic Cathedral at Avarua, located near Nukutere College, was also affected by the same land problem and benefitted from the same solution.

== Future ==
In October 2019, the foundation stone for the rebuilding of the school after the 2013 fire and on the resolution of the land problems, was laid in the presence the Prime Minister of the Cook Islands, Henry Puna and the Bishop of the Rarotonga, Bishop Paul Donohue SM. Puna said that the Cook Islands government supported the school all the way through and were aware of the land issues. “It became clear to us, one really positive way we can help out and that was to ensure you never encounter land issues anymore, so you can plan with certainty going into the future." Delaney Yaqona, the principal of the college, said, "this is a new beginning for Nukutere this is the start of the rebuild; thank you to the landowners for the peaceful negotiations, the Catholic community, all the teachers, students and the parents". He said that the college was looking forward to introducing a year 12 class. This would mean that the students could gain university entrance qualifications while remaining at Nukutere. "Earth rocks" selected from the Arai-Te-Tonga marae were laid into the foundation by Deputy Prime Minister Mark Brown, Munukoa Purea, Chairman of the school board, Bishop Donaghue, Mike Savage, and Sister Elizabeth. Bishop Donoghue also placed a jar holding a statue of Saint Joseph and a list of names of every student of the college present at the occasion into the foundation trench. In his closing address he noted: 'St Joseph is our spokesperson with God, he is our protector, he is the patron of workmen.'

== Christian Brothers ==
The Christian Brothers ceased to be on the staff of the college at the end of 2009. More than 20 Christian Brothers served at Nukutere College (1975–2009). Among them were: Br Simon Germaine Coughlan, Br Andrew Dawani, Br Anthony Eugenio Gherardi, Br Norman Campion Gillies, Br Paul Kikisi, Br Terence Vitus McErlane, Br Joseph De Porres McRae, Br Kevin Flavian Moncur, Br John Didicus O'Neill, Br Francis William Perkins, Br John Paschal Prendergast, Br Ignacy John Rubisz, Br Michael Benignus Scanlan, Br Benjamin Everard Ryan and Br Lawrence Hubert Wilkes.

The Christian Brothers Congregation in New Zealand supported the college and the brothers financially so the new school could develop. Several brothers did extra work outside the school to assist the local community. Brother Anthony Gherardi is remembered for promoting the sport of volleyball on Rarotonga and Brother John O'Neill spent several years as the Catholic prison chaplain. Brother Gherardi (died 1998, aged 60) and Brother Ignacy Rubisz (died 23 October 2005, aged 56), died while stationed at the college and are buried in the Old Cathedral Cemetery, Avarua, adjacent to the grounds of Nukutere College.

== Principals ==
The following individuals have served as principals of the College:

Ordinal	Officeholder	Term start	Term end	Time in office	Notes
1	Fr. Peter Salamonsen, S.M.	1975	1975	1 year	
2	Bro. Terry McErlane, c.f.c.	1976	1981	6 years	
3	Bro. Benjamin Everard Ryan, c.f.c.	1982	1988	9 years	
4	Fr. Paul Farmer	1988	19??	unknown	
5	Henrica Wilson	19??	1998	unknown	
6	Bro. Norman Campion Gillies, c.f.c.	1998	2000	5 years	
7	Bro. Francis William Perkins, c.f.c.	2001	2005	5 years	
8	Donna Nahu	2006	2012	7 years	
9	George Rasmussen	2013	2017	5 years	
10	Delaney Yoqona	2018	2024	7 years	
11	Rauhina Tipuna	2024	2025	(acting) 1 year	
12	Henrianna Yaqona	2026	incumbent		

== Notable alumni ==
- Winton Pickering (born 8 December 1962), Member of Parliament (2004–present).
