= Catholic Church in Fiji =

The Catholic Church in Fiji is part of the worldwide Catholic Church, under the canonical authority and spiritual leadership of the Pope of Rome.

== Latin hierarchy ==
Archdiocese of Suva, covers the whole country and has two suffragan dioceses outside the country. They are:

- Diocese of Rarotonga: For Catholics in the Cook Islands and Niue Islands, which are associated countries of New Zealand
- Diocese of Tarawa and Nauru: It has its base at Tarawa on Kiribati island, and covers Catholics in that island and also those in Nauru republic.

They all partake in the Episcopal Conference of the Pacific (C.E. PAC), which is part of the broader Federation of Catholic Bishops' Conferences of Oceania (FCBCO) ). As most of these countries do not have more than a single bishop, they do not warrant a national Episcopal conferences.

Archdiocese of Suva has a history dating back to 1863 when the Vatican created the Prefecture Apostolic of Fiji Island from the Vicariate Apostolic of Central Oceania. It was made Vicariate Apostolic of Fiji Island in 1887. The Vicariate became the Archdiocese of Suva in 1966.

There is formally an Apostolic Nunciature (papal diplomatic representation, embassy level) to the Fiji Islands but it is vested (as with many South Sea states) in the Apostolic Nunciature in the New Zealand capital, Wellington.

== History ==
Missions of the Marist Fathers were begun in the Lau Islands in 1844 and then in Levuka but were initially unsuccessful. A more successful mission began in Levuka in 1861. Many churches were built by Bishop Julien Vidal around 1900. Relations with Methodist missionaries were competitive, with Cardinal Moran in Sydney debating Protestant speakers on mutual allegations of wrongdoing in Fiji. Australian Methodists protested against the appointment of a Catholic, Henry Jackson, as Governor of Fiji in 1902, provoking counter-protests in Fiji.

On 13 July 2020, New Zealand's 1News revealed that a year-long investigation found that the Catholic Church in Fiji had at least 1,300 allegations of sexual abuse against children, many of which also involved Catholic schools. Some of the accused clergy were also originally from Australia and New Zealand before they were transferred to Fiji. Dr Murray Heasley from the Network of Survivors in Faith Based Institution also stated to 1News that Fiji was common place for the New Zealand Catholic Church to transfer accused clergy. Australian priest Julian Fox, who was later convicted and jailed in 2015 for child sex crimes, was transferred to Fiji in 1999 after Australian police started an investigation against him. It was also confirmed that the church also had knowledge of sex abuse allegations against Fox nine years before he was charged.

Caritas Fiji is the social arm of the Catholic Church.

== Demographics ==
In 2023, there were approximately 83,000 Catholics in Fiji, making up 9.1% of the total population. The 1996 census revealed just over 75 percent of Catholics to be indigenous Fijians and 5 percent Indo-Fijians, with minority communities making up the balance. The present leader of the Catholic Church in Fiji is Archbishop Peter Loy Chong.

== See also ==
- Religion in Fiji
- Vicariate Apostolic of Fiji
- List of Catholic dioceses in South Pacific Conference states
- Methodist Church of Fiji and Rotuma
- Hinduism in Fiji

== Sources and external links ==
- GCatholic - Fiji - data for all sections
- Catholic Hierarchy - Archdiocese of Suva
