= Reynaldo Getalado =

The Most Reverend Reynaldo Getalado
- 7th Bishop of Rarotonga
- Diocese: Diocese of Rarotonga
- Appointed: 2024

Orders
- Ordination: 4 August 1988
- Consecration: 27 April 2024 by Paul Donoghue, 6th Bishop of Rarotonga

Personal details
- Born: Reynaldo Getalado; 5 August 1959 (age 66) Muntinlupa, Rizal, Philippines
- Coat of arms

Reynaldo Bunyi Getalado MSP (born 5 August 1959) is the seventh Bishop of Rarotonga.

== Biography ==
Getalado was born in Muntinlupa, Rizal Province, The Philippines. He earned a bachelor's degree in zoology at the Far Eastern University in Manila in 1979. He trained for the priesthood at the Seminary of the Mission Society of the Philippines in Tagaytay City. He completed his training at the Divine Word Seminary, Tagaytay City, and was ordained to the priesthood on 4 August 1988.

After his ordination, he was sent to the Diocese of Daru-Kiunga in Papua New Guinea and ministered there for eleven years. He was transferred to the Diocese of Auckland, New Zealand, and worked there for three years. In New Zealand he was assigned to Waitaruke where he ministered to Te Kura o Hato Hohepa Te Kamura and to isolated communities in New Zealand's far north. He was also stationed at St John the Evangelist Parish in Ōtara from 2000 to 2004. In Ōtara he met his first Cook Islands families. In 2004, Getalado returned to the Philippines for a year.

From 2005, he was located in Bougainville. In 2014, Getalado was appointed Ecclesiastical Superior of the Mission sui iuris of Funafuti Tuvalu.

On 8 December 2023, Getalado was appointed as coadjutor Bishop of Rarotonga. He was ordained a bishop in St. Joseph's Cathedral, Avarua with the Principal Consecrator being Bishop Paul Patrick Donoghue, S.M. 6th Bishop of Rarotonga and the Principal Co-Consecrators were Bishop Ryan Pagente Jimenez, Bishop of Chalan Kanoa, Northern Mariana Islands and Archbishop Jean-Pierre Edmond Cottanceau, SS.CC. of Papeete, French Polynesia.

On 24 June 2024, Getalado became Bishop of Rarotonga in succession to Bishop Donoghue on his retirement.

Catholic Church titles
| Preceded by John Ikataere MSC | Superior of the Mission, Funafuti, Tuvalu; 2014–2024 | Succeeded by Eliseo Napiere MSP |
| Preceded by Paul Donoghue | 7th Bishop of Rarotonga; 2024–present | Succeeded by incumbent |
