= Paul Donoghue =

His Excellency Paul Donoghue SM
- 6th Bishop of Rarotonga
- Church: Catholic Church
- Diocese: Rarotonga
- Installed: 5 February 2018

Orders
- Consecration: 16 July 2011 by Stuart O'Connell

Personal details
- Born: 18 January 1949 (age 77) Te Puke, New Zealand
- Denomination: Roman Catholic
- Motto: We Are One in Christ
- Coat of arms

Paul Donoghue SM (born 18 January 1949) is a retired bishop who was the sixth Bishop of Rarotonga in the Cook Islands from 2011 to 2024. He was appointed bishop by Pope Benedict XVI on 11 April 2011.

== Early life ==
Donoghue was born in Te Puke. He received his secondary education at St Patrick's College, Silverstream. After studies at Mount St Mary's Seminary, Greenmeadows and a period as a Marist Brother, he was professed as a member of the Society of Mary on 7 January 1969 and ordained a priest by Bishop John Mackey at Frankton on 29 June 1975.

== Career ==
After ordination, Donoghue taught for some time at St Bede's College, Christchurch, before joining the Marist Oceania province. When he was appointed Bishop of Rarotonga he was the Provincial Superior of the Oceania province (2006–2011). Prior to being provincial he taught at Chanel College, Moamoa (1977–1981), Samoa, and was Marist novice master at the Marist Training Centre, Tutu, Taveuni Island (1985–1990), Fiji. He was director of the St Martin de Porres Centre, Lololima, Malekula Island, Vanuatu (1993–1996) and regional superior, Vanuatu (1996–1998). He returned to Tutu and was formator of novices there (1998–2000). From 2000 to 2006 he participated in the Marist renewal programme in Ireland.

== Episcopacy ==
Donoghue was consecrated a bishop on 16 July 2011 with his immediate predecessor, Bishop Stuart France O’Connell, S.M as principal consecrator. The principal co-consecrators were Archbishop Charles Daniel Balvo (Nuncio to the Cook Islands) and Bishop Denis George Browne of Hamilton (also a predecessor in Rarotonga).

== Resignation ==
Donoghue's retirement from the Bishophric of Rarotonga became effective on 29 June 2024, the same day he would become the Principal Consecrator of his successor, Bishop Reynaldo Getalado MSP.

Catholic Church titles
Preceded by Stuart O'Connell	6th Bishop of Rarotonga; 2011–present	Succeeded by Incumbent
