= Mission sui iuris of Tokelau =

Latin Catholic missionary jurisdiction in Tokelau

Mission sui iuris of Tokelau Missio Sui Iuris Tokelaunum

Location
- Country: Tokelau
- Territory: Tokelau
- Ecclesiastical province: Samoa–Apia
- Metropolitan: Archdiocese of Samoa–Apia
- Headquarters: Nukunonu
- Coordinates: 9°12′02″S 171°54′54″W

Statistics
- Area: 10 km^{2} (3.9 sq mi)
- Population: Total; Catholics: (as of 2024); 2,000; 480 (24.0%%)
- Parishes: 2
- Churches: 2

Information
- Denomination: Catholic Church
- Sui iuris church: Latin Church
- Rite: Latin Rite
- Established: 26 June 1992
- Secular priests: 1 (1 diocesan, 0 religious)
- Language: Tokelauan, English
- Calendar: General Roman Calendar

Current leadership
- Governance: Dicastery for Evangelization
- Pope: Pope Leo XIV
- Ecclesiastical Superior: Mosese Vitolio Tui, S.D.B.
- Metropolitan Archbishop: Mosese Vitolio Tui, S.D.B.
- Bishops emeritus: Oliver Pugoy Aro, M.S.P. (Superior Emeritus)

Map
- Location of Tokelau in Oceania
- Statistics per the Annuario Pontificio (2025).

The Mission sui iuris of Tokelau (Latin: Missio Sui Iuris Tokelaunum) in Tokelau is a Latin Catholic suffragan mission of the Archdiocese of Samoa-Apia. It was formed in 1992 when the Archdiocese of Samoa-Apia and Tokelau was split into the Archdiocese of Samoa-Apia and the Mission sui iuris of Tokelau.

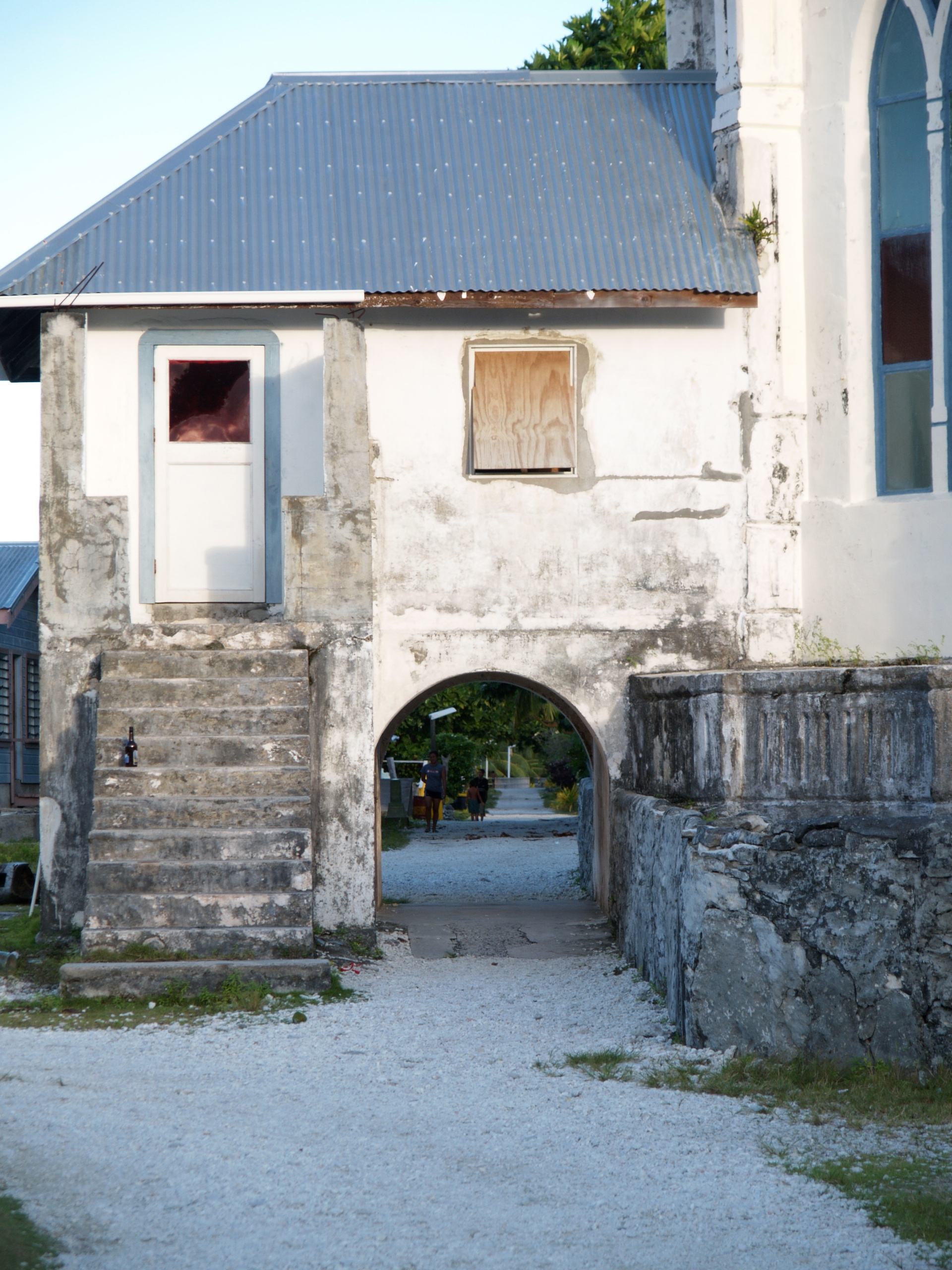
The Nukunonu Church

== History ==
From the discovery of the island by Europeans in 1841, several attempts were made by Catholic missionaries to reach Tokelau from Wallis Island between 1845 and 1863. The first Catholic baptism was performed in 1863 on one adult and three children, and several other occurred soon after. Father Didier lived in the country from 1883 to 1890, the year he died at sea. Two elders who were educated in Samoa acted as catechists starting in 1904, and others continued their role over time. The Catholic Church allowed traditional music and dance to be incorporated into Catholic religious ritual, contributing to their efforts at converting the populace.

In 1945 Father Jepson came to Tokelau and proposed having a priest permanently stationed there, a church be constructed, and the Order of Mary provide sisters to the island. Father Patrick O'Connor was the only foreigner residing in the country as of 2011. He was assigned to the island country by the Archbishop of Samoa in 1977 to take care of the Catholic parish on the atoll of Nukunonu and has resided there since then. The church services are conducted in Tokelau. The atoll of Nukunonu is mostly Catholic, while Fakaofo and Atafu atolls have both Catholic and Congregational churches. Many religious rules are followed, such as families gathering at 6pm for prayers, a midnight curfew, and a ban on swimming on Sundays.

== Ecclesiastical Superiors ==
Order	Name	Appointed	Term ended	Term of office	Reason for term end
1	Patrick Edward O'Connor	26 Jun 1992	May 2011	18 years, 10 months	Resigned
2	Oliver Pugoy Aro, MSP	6 May 2011	2015	3–4 years	Resigned
3	Alapati Lui Mataeliga	22 Dec 2015	25 April 2023	7 years, 4 months and 3 days	Died
4	Mosese Vitolio Tui	21 Dec 2024	Incumbent	1 year, 11 months and 1 day	

== See also ==
- Nukunonu Church
