= Nukunonu Church =

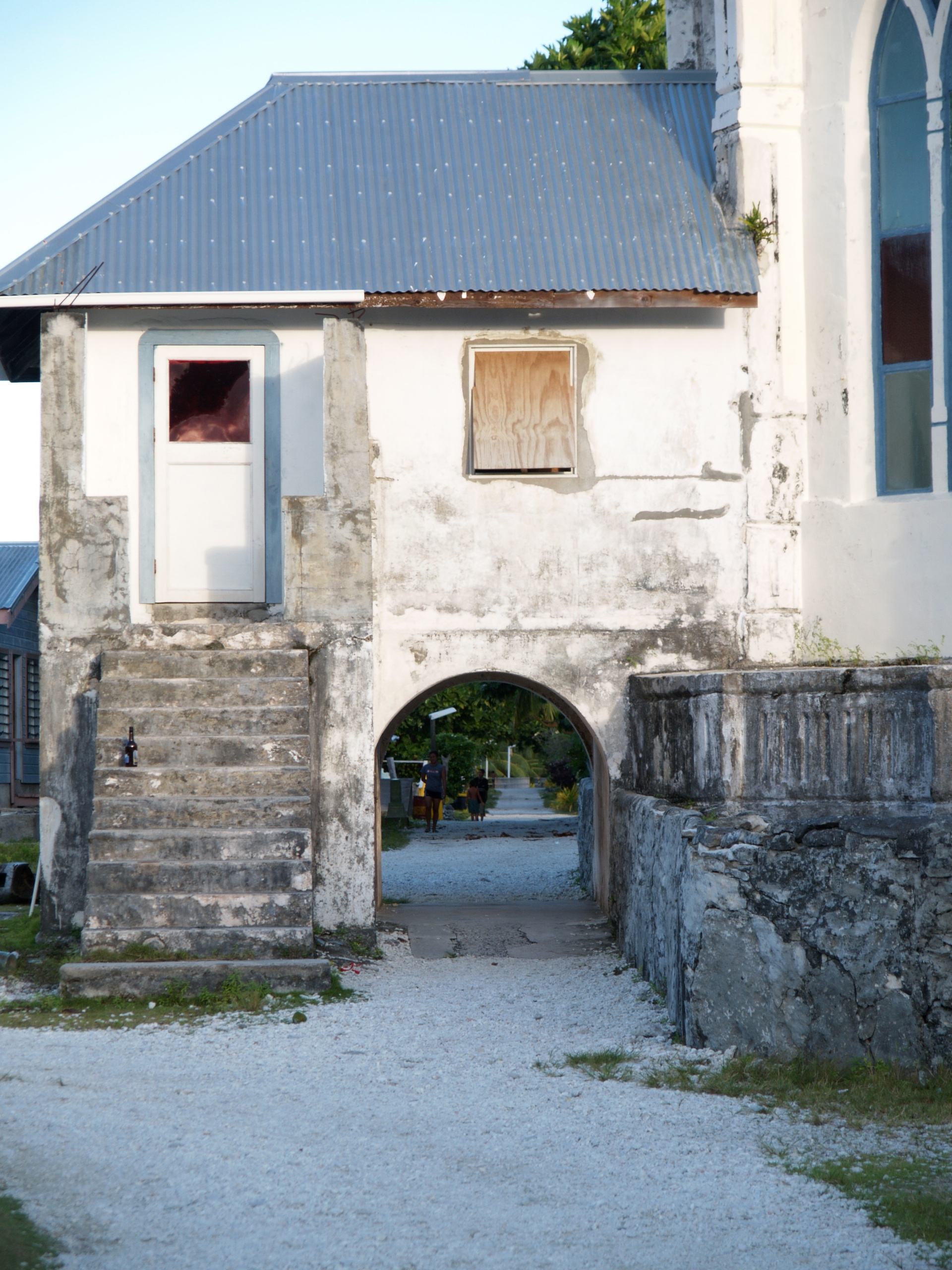
- The arch crosses the main street of the village.
- Nukunonu Church
- 9°11′58.7″S 171°50′57.0″W
- Location: Nukunonu
- Country: Tokelau
- Denomination: Catholic

The Nukunonu Churchaaq is a Catholic church that is in the atoll of Nukunonu in Tokelau, a dependent territory of New Zealand in the Pacific Ocean. It is the main Catholic church in Tokelau, the other being in Fakaofo atoll.

The church is under the jurisdiction of the Mission sui iuris of Tokelau (Missio sui iuris Tokelauna) and follows the Roman or Latin rite. It is under the pastoral responsibility of the Ecclesiastical Superior of the mission.

== Background ==
The church is dedicated to the Sacred Heart and is listed by GCatholic as a pro-cathedral. Nukunonu is almost exclusively Catholic. Around 81.8 percent of its residents identified as Roman Catholic in the 2016 census, down from 93.9 percent in 2011. Missionaries preached Christianity in Tokelau from 1845, and Nukunonu was converted to Catholicism. One of the early converts, a Nukunonu chief named Justin Takua, later introduced the Catholic faith to Tokelau.

In 1949 the Missionary Sisters of the Society of Mary opened a school on the atoll, and the Sisters of Our Lady of Nazareth continued its work until 1994. The renovated church was blessed on 1 May 2015 by Father Oliver Aro, assisted by Deacon Pio Tuia. In mid-2015 the Catholic Church in Tokelau marked 150 years of Catholic life with celebrations on Nukunonu, attended by the apostolic nuncio to New Zealand, Archbishop Martin Krebs. The island's population of about 450 roughly doubled for the week. Monsignor Aro, the superior of the mission, was then the only priest in Tokelau.
