= Bernardin Castanié =

Bernardin Castanié SSCC
- Prefect of Cook Islands
- Church: Catholic Church
- See: Prefecture Apostolic of Cook Islands
- In office: 1 February 1923 – 14 May 1939
- Predecessor: Prefecture erected
- Successor: John David Hubaldus Lehman

Orders
- Ordination: 18 October 1892

Personal details
- Born: 13 January 1869 Bozouls, Aveyron, French Empire
- Died: 14 May 1939 (aged 70)

Bernardin Castanié (born in 1869 in Bozouls) was a French clergyman and prefect apostolic for the present Roman Catholic Diocese of Rarotonga, then Prefecture Apostolic of Cook and Manihiki. He was appointed prefect apostolic in 1923. He died in 1939.
