= Joseph Darnand (bishop) =

Joseph Darnand

Msgr. Joseph Darnand, S.M., D.D., Vicar Apostolic of the Navigators' Archipelago, was born in Beny, Ain, France on December 31, 1879. He professed the evangelical counsels on December 20, 1903 for the Society of Mary (Marists). He was subsequently ordained to the presbyterate for the Marists on July 16, 1905. He was consecrated to the episcopate by Archbishop Thomas O'Shea of Wellington, New Zealand as successor to Msgr. Broyer and as Titular Bishop of Polemonium and Vicar Apostolic of the Navigators' Archipelago on May 16, 1920. In 1945 Msgr. Darnand observed the centennial of the arrival of the Marists in Samoa; the government of France honored his ministry and awarded him membership in the Legion of Honor. He retired from active ministry on November 23, 1953 and remained at Moamoa. He died on June 1, 1962.

In 1953, Darnand was awarded the Queen Elizabeth II Coronation Medal.

Book: 1934 "Aux Iles Samoa - La forêt qui s'illumine" (E. Vitte Lyon / Paris)

== Sources ==
- Galuega O Le Sinoti (Acts of the Snyod of the Archdiocese of Samoa-Apia), December 7–14, 1990, promulgated, May 1, 1991, Feast of Saint Joseph the Worker. Apia, Samoa.
