= Peter Chong =

Peter Chong may refer to:

- Peter Chong (karateka) (born 1941), Singaporean martial artist
- Peter Chong (criminal) (born 1943), American criminal
- Peter Loy Chong (born 1961), Catholic Archbishop of Suva, Fiji
- Peter Chong (actor) (1898–1985), Chinese-American actor
