= Giovanni Battista Dieter =

Msgr. Giovanni Battista Dieter, S.M., D.D., Vicar Apostolic of the Navigators' Archipelago, was born in Kleinhausen (Germany) on 30 September 1903. He professed the evangelical counsels on 17 April 1929 for the Society of Mary (Marists). He was subsequently ordained to the presbyterate for the Marists on 29 June 1933. He was consecrated to the episcopate as Titular Bishop of Ierafi and Vicar Apostolic of the Navigators' Archipelago on 19 May 1954. He died in Auckland, New Zealand on 29 June 1955.
