= Eliseo Napiere =

Filipino Catholic priest

- Superior Mission sui iuris of Funafuti
- Appointed: 2024

Orders
- Ordination: January 19, 1991

Personal details
- Born: Elieo Napiere; June 14, 1965 (age 60) Maribojoc, Bohol, Philippines

Eliseo Napiere MSP is a Filipino Catholic priest who is the superior of the Mission sui iuris of Funafuti in Tuvalu. He was appointed to the post by Pope Francis on June 3, 2024.

== Early life ==
Napiere was born on June 14, 1965, in Maribojoc, Bohol in the Philippines.

== Career ==
He was ordained priest on January 19, 1991, for the Mission Society of the Philippines. In 1991 and 1992, he was parish priest of the Blessed Sacrament Parish in Reclamation Area, Cebu City. He was Scholastic Director and Procurator of the Seminary of the Mission Society of the Philippines (Fil-Mission Seminary) in Tagaytay City from 1992 to 1994. He was a member of the General Council and Bursar General of the Mission Society of the Philippines (1994–1999) He then served the church as a missionary in different parts of the world. From 2002 to 2016, Napiere served as a missionary to the Diocese of Taichung in Taiwan (2002–2016). From 2007 to 2016, he held the following positions in Taichung: executive secretary of the Chinese Regional Bishops’ Conference, Episcopal Commission on Migrants and Itinerant People; national director of the Apostleship of the Sea; Pastor of Blessed Sacrament Church; and diocesan migrants’ director and chaplain. In the United States he was parish vicar of Saint Edward, Corona, Diocese of San Bernardino (2016–2018) and from 2018 to 2024, member of the Presbyteral Council and parish priest of Saint James the Less in Perris in the same diocese.

He was appointed as superior of the Mission sui iuris in Funifuti on June 3, 2024, and was installed in the position on September 8, 2024.

Catholic Church titles
Preceded by Reynaldo Getalado MSP	Superior of the Mission, Funafuti, Tuvalu; 2024-present	Succeeded by Incumbent
