= Mosese Vitolio Tui =

Samoan Roman Catholic priest and archbishop

His Excellency, The Most Reverend Mosese Vitolio Tui SDB
- Archbishop of Samoa-Apia and Ecclesiastical Superior of the Mission Sui Iuris of Tokelau
- Archdiocese: Samoa-Apia
- Appointed: June 12, 2024
- Installed: August 22, 2024
- Predecessor: Alapati Lui Mataeliga

Orders
- Ordination: December 3, 1994
- Consecration: August 22, 2024 by Peter Brown, Kolio Etuale, and Stephen Lowe

Personal details
- Born: November 9, 1961 (age 64) Apia, Samoa
- Motto: Vivi'i Lo'u Loto I Le Ali'i (My Heart Praises the Lord)
- Coat of arms

Styles of Mosese Vitolio Tui
- Reference style: His Excellency; The Most Reverend
- Spoken style: Your Excellency
- Religious style: Archbishop

Mosese Vitolio Tui (born November 9, 1961) is a Samoan priest of the Catholic Church who serves as archbishop for the Archdiocese of Samoa-Apia and Ecclesiastical Superior of the Mission sui iuris of Tokelau.

== Biography ==
Tui was born on November 9, 1961, in Apia, Samoa. In 1986, he entered the Salesian novitiate in Lysterfield, Australia, and made his first religious vows in 1987. He professed his solemn vows on December 8, 1992. On December 3, 1994, Tui was ordained to the priesthood in Alafua, Samoa, becoming the first Salesian Samoan.

=== Episcopal career ===
Pope Francis appointed Tui archbishop for the Archdiocese of Samoa-Apia on June 12, 2024. On August 22, 2024, Tui was consecrated as a bishop.

== See also ==
- Catholic Church hierarchy
- Lists of patriarchs, archbishops, and bishops

== Episcopal succession ==
Catholic Church titles
Preceded by Alapati Lui Mataeliga	Ecclesiastical Superior of Tokelau; 2024-present	Succeeded by Incumbent

Catholic Church titles
Preceded by Alapati Lui Mataeliga	Bishop of Samoa-Apia; 2024-Present	Succeeded by Incumbent
