= George Hamilton Pearce =

George Hamilton Pearce S.M.
- Archbishop of Suva
- Church: Catholic Church
- Archdiocese: Archdiocese of Suva
- In office: June 22, 1967 – April 10, 1976
- Predecessor: Victor Frederick Foley
- Successor: Petero Mataca
- Previous posts: Bishop of Apia (1966-1967); Vicar Apostolic of the Islands of Samoa and Tokelau (1957-1966); Titular Bishop of Attalea in Pamphylia (1956-1966); Vicar Apostolic of the Archipelago of the Navigators (1956-1957)

Orders
- Ordination: February 3, 1947 by Richard Cushing
- Consecration: June 29, 1956 by Richard Cushing

Personal details
- Born: January 9, 1921 Brighton, Boston, Massachusetts, United States
- Died: August 30, 2015 (aged 94)

Styles of George Hamilton Pearce
- Reference style: The Most Reverend
- Spoken style: Your Excellency
- Religious style: Archbishop
- Posthumous style: not applicable

George Hamilton Pearce (January 9, 1921 – August 30, 2015) was the first Bishop of the Roman Catholic Diocese of Apia, Samoa, and the first Archbishop of the Roman Catholic Archdiocese of Suva, Fiji.

Born in Boston, Massachusetts, his education included Saint Columbkille's Elementary School in Brighton, Massachusetts, Maryvale Preparatory Seminary in Bedford, Massachusetts, and at Marist College and Seminary in Framingham, Massachusetts. He was ordained to the presbyterate on February 3, 1947, by Archbishop (and future Cardinal) Richard Cushing and was appointed Vicar Apostolic of the Navigators' Archipelago and Titular Bishop of Attalea in Pamphylia on February 29, 1956. He was consecrated to the episcopate on June 29, 1956, in Boston by Cushing.

On June 21, 1966, the Holy See elevated the vicariate apostolic to the dignity of a diocese and Pearce became the first Bishop of Apia. He was appointed as the first Archbishop of Suva, Fiji on June 22, 1967. He retired on April 10, 1976, and lived in Providence, Rhode Island where he led a Marian prayer group at the Cathedral of Saints Peter and Paul. Pearce visited Fatima, Lourdes, and Medjugorje. Pearce died on August 30, 2015, at the age of 94.

== Sources ==
- Biography of Msgr. George Hamilton Pearce profile, dioceseofprovidence.org; accessed August 30, 2015.
- Galuega O Le Sinoti (Acts of the Synod of the Archdiocese of Samoa-Apia), December 7–14, 1990, promulgated, May 1, 1991, Feast of Saint Joseph the Worker (Apia, Samoa).

Catholic Church titles
Preceded by Victor Frederick Foley (as bishop)	Archbishop of Suva; June 22, 1967 – April 10, 1976	Succeeded by Petero Mataca
