= Sacred Heart Cathedral, Suva =

Coordinates: 18.1416°S 178.4420°E

Sacred Heart Cathedral
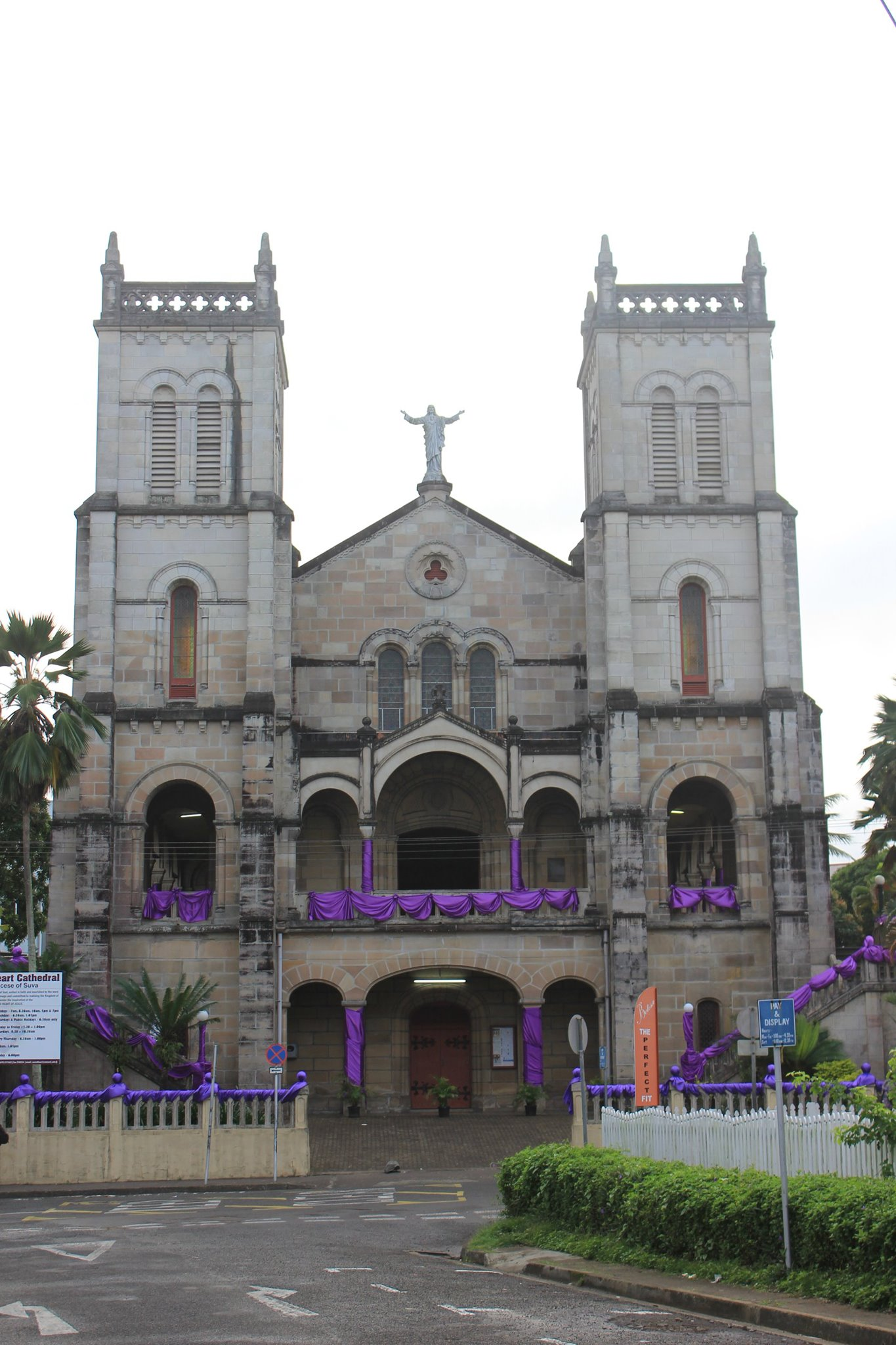
- Sacred Heart Cathedral
- Location: Suva
- Country: Fiji
- Denomination: Roman Catholic Church

The Sacred Heart Cathedral or simply Cathedral of Suva, is the main ecclesiastical building of the Roman Catholic Church in the island nation of Fiji, and is located on Pratt Street in the City of Suva, Fiji's capital.

Suva Cathedral was built in 1902 with sandstone brought from quarries near Sydney, Australia. Its architecture is inspired by the churches of Rome in Italy. The building is covered with ornaments and stained glass and has a crypt in the basement.

The cathedral serves as the headquarters of the Metropolitan Archdiocese of Suva (Archidioecesis suvana) which was created in 1966 by Pope Paul VI by bull "Prophetarum voices".

== See also ==
- Roman Catholicism in Fiji

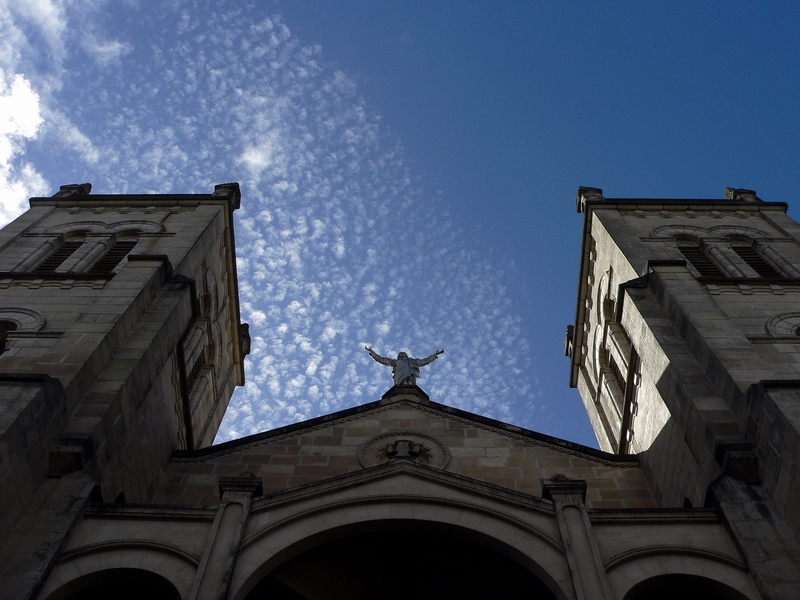
view of the towers
