= Petero Mataca =

- Archbishop of Suva
- Church: Catholic Church
- Archdiocese: Archdiocese of Suva
- In office: 10 April 1976 – 19 December 2012
- Predecessor: George Hamilton Pearce
- Successor: Peter Loy Chong
- Previous posts: Titular Bishop of Siminina (1974-1976); Auxiliary Bishop of Suva (1974-1976)

Orders
- Ordination: 19 December 1959 by Gregorio Pietro Agagianian
- Consecration: 3 December 1974 by George Hamilton Pearce

Personal details
- Born: 28 April 1933 Cawaci, Ovalau, Colony of Fiji, British Empire
- Died: 30 June 2014 (aged 81) Suva, Fiji

Petero Mataca CF (28 April 1933 – 30 June 2014) born at Cawaci, on Ovalau Island, served as the Roman Catholic archbishop of Suva, Fiji until his resignation in 2012.

== Biography ==
After his education at St. John's College, Cawaci, he was ordained as a priest on 20 December 1959. He was named a bishop on 3 December 1974 when he was appointed titular bishop of Siminina and auxiliary bishop of Suva; following his appointment as a bishop, he was consecrated the same year. On 10 April 1976, he was appointed archbishop of Suva. He resigned in July 2009 when he reached the age of 75, but could not step down until a successor was appointed. On 19 December 2012, his resignation was accepted by Pope Benedict XVI. He died on 30 June 2014 at the Suva Private Hospital after a long illness.

== Political positions ==
Mataca was a critic of some government policies, including its proposal to establish a Reconciliation and Unity Commission with the power, subject to presidential approval, to compensate victims and pardon perpetrators of the 2000 Fijian coup d'état that deposed the elected government of Prime Minister Mahendra Chaudhry in 2000.

On 22 June 2005, Mataca accused Prime Minister Laisenia Qarase of having misled church leaders about the provisions of the legislation to establish the Commission. Mataca and the leaders of a number of other denominations, he said, had been summoned to the Prime Minister's office on 2 May where they had been told about the bill's reconciliation and compensation provisions, which they had heartily endorsed. Only later, through the media, did they learn about its amnesty provisions.

Mataca said he did not support the concept of amnesty for persons convicted of political crimes. The overthrow of a democratically elected government a serious crime, he said, and "the coup cycle" would continue unless those involved faced the consequences of their crimes. "I publicly appeal to our President, our Prime Minister and the members of our Government to withdraw the Bill until such time as proper consultations can be held and appropriate amendments made," Mataca said. Reconciliation and unity could not come from a politically motivated bill, he warned. On the contrary, he saw reconciliation as a healing process that must start with truth telling, confession of wrongdoing, genuine request for forgiveness and willingness to accept the consequences of one's actions. "It seems ... that the Bill has been hastily put together for political purposes - especially in view of the elections next year," Mataca said. "This is not in the interests of the country and any stubborn effort by the Government to push through this Bill will be counter productive and will threaten Fiji's future stability."

== View of Christian political activism ==
In an article written for the Fiji Sun on 12 January 2006, Mataca condemned voices, who claimed to be Christian, who advocated proclaiming Fiji a Christian state, banning other religions, condemning homosexuality, and requiring leadership positions to be reserved for approved Christians. He called for what he called "authentic Christian voices" to speak up, and for the true path of Jesus to be followed.

Writing an editorial in the Fiji Sun on 6 March 2006, Mataca called on Christians to avoid getting caught up in ethnic politics in the upcoming election due on 6–13 May, and said that calls for Christians to mobilize politically against others was contrary to the teaching and example of Jesus.

== 2006 coup d'état ==
In the wake of the military coup which deposed the civilian government of Prime Minister Laisenia Qarase on 5 December 2006, Mataca took a more nuanced position than the leaders of many other denominations, and refused to endorse a statement put out by the Assembly of Christian Churches (ACCF) and the Fiji Council of Churches (FCC), which described the Fijian Military, commanded by Commodore Frank Bainimarama, as "manifestations of darkness and evil." Mataca said that such a stance was hypocritical, as the organizations had failed to condemn the previous coup of 2000. In a letter to the Fiji Sun on 10 December, he condemned the coup, but also claimed that the government had pursued policies that had led to it. He later collaborated with the military regime, serving as co-chairman, along with Commodore Bainimarama, of the National Council for Building a Better Fiji.

== Social views ==
On 6 January 2006, the Fiji Sun quoted Mataca as calling on people to "respect, protect, and preserve" family values. He condemned Fiji's high divorce rate, and criticized legislation which facilitated it.

== Death ==
Mataca died at the Suva Private Hospital after a long illness on 30 June 2014.

Catholic Church titles
Preceded by George Hamilton Pearce	Archbishop of Suva; 10 April 1976 – 19 December 2012	Succeeded by Peter Loy Chong
