= Catholic Schools Board Limited =

Education organization

Catholic Schools Board Limited is a private company, originally established by the Archdiocese of Wellington. It was established when Wellington Catholic schools began integrating into the state system. The Catholic Schools Board Limited manages school property and attendance dues. Attendance dues are a legal obligation of enrolment in Catholic schools and are not a donation or tax deductible. The Palmerston North Diocese schools are now also managed by Catholic Schools Board Limited.

The Catholic Religious Order or Diocese who own each school add to funding received by the Catholic Schools Board Limited.
