= Titikaveka =

Coordinates: 21°16′7.01″S 159°45′31.15″W

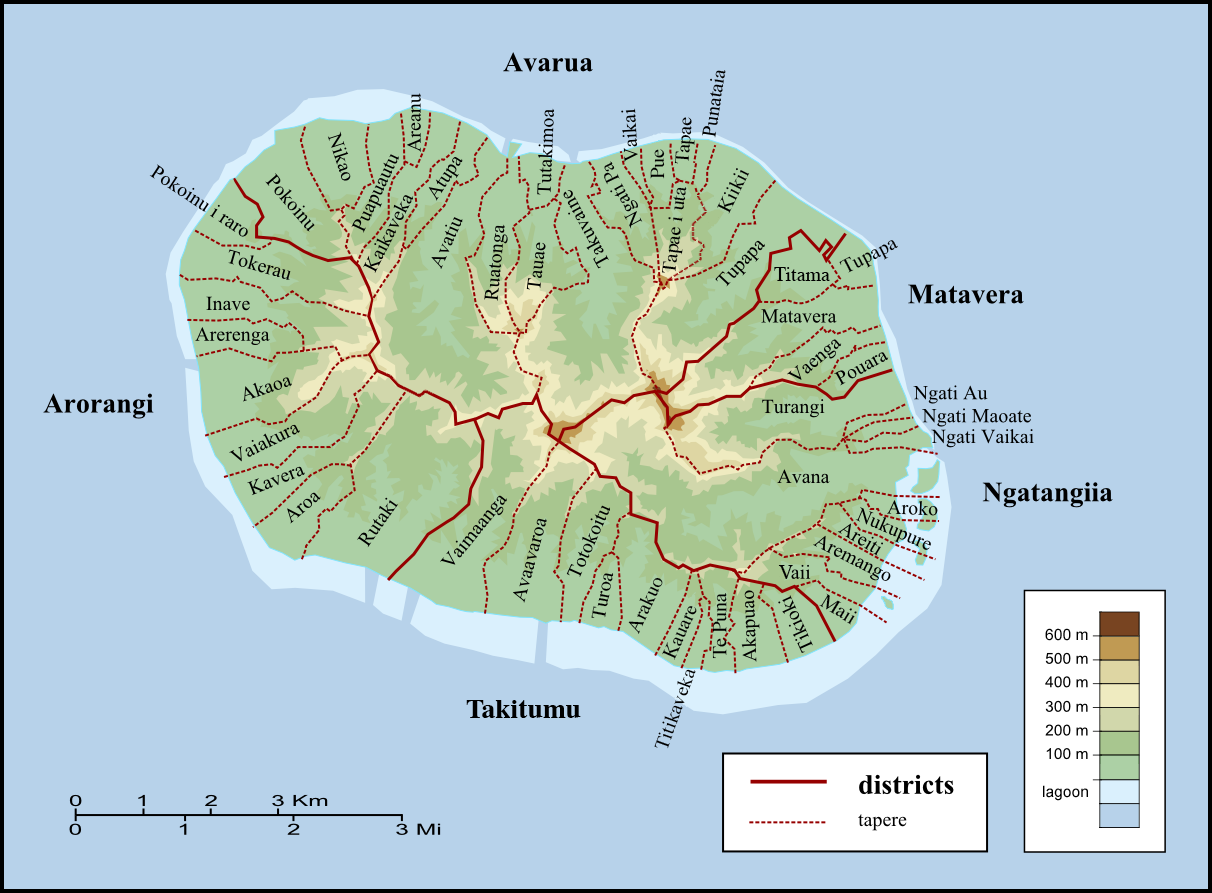
Districts and tapere on Rarotonga.

Titikaveka is one of the five districts that make up the island of Rarotonga in the Cook Islands. It is located in the south of the island, to the south of the districts of Ngatangiia and Avarua, and east of the district of Arorangi.
