= Arorangi =

District of the Cook Islands

Coordinates: 21.221381°S 159.82687°W

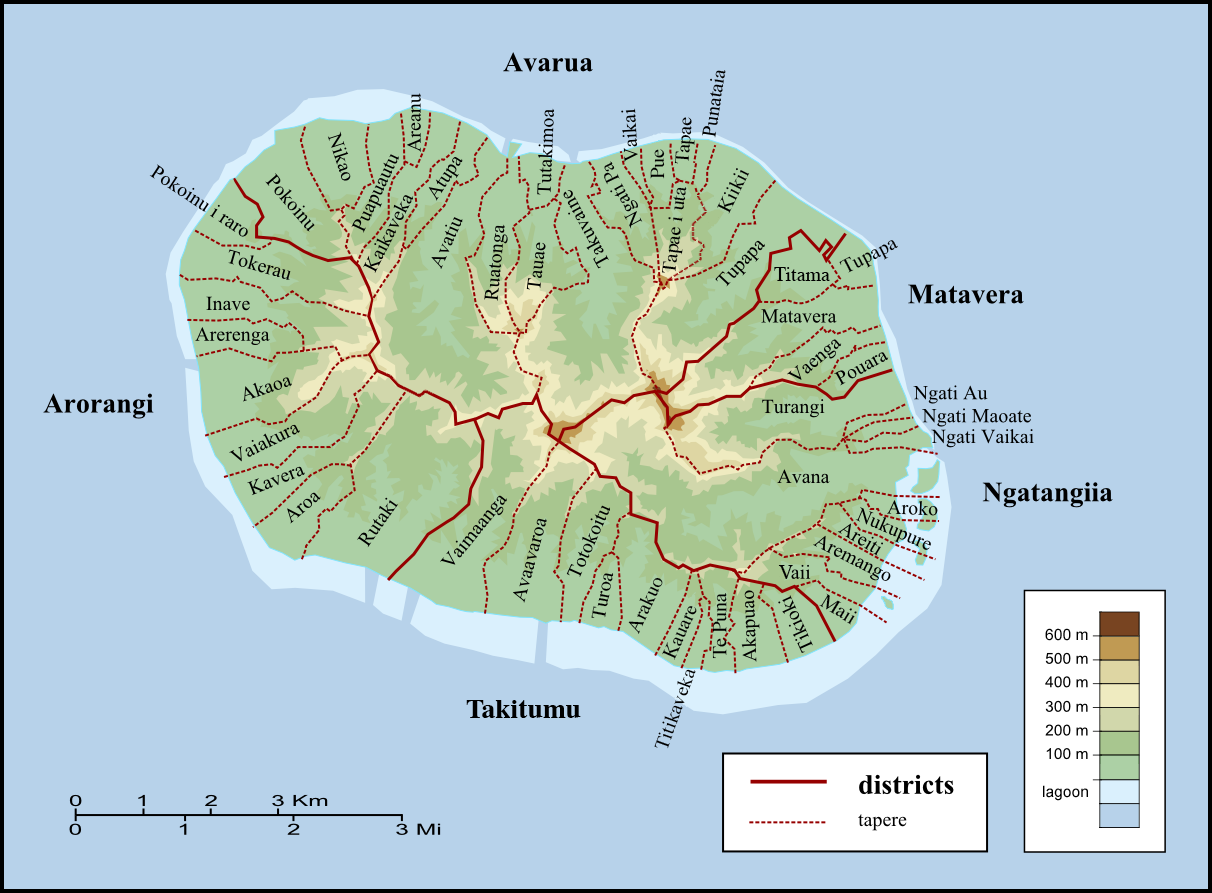
Districts and tapere on Rarotonga.

Arorangi is one of the five districts that make up the island of Rarotonga in the Cook Islands. It is located in the west of the island, to the northwest of the district of Titikaveka, and southwest of the district of Avarua.
