= Hendrick Joseph Cornelius Maria de Cocq =

The Most Reverend Hendrick Joseph Cornelius Maria de Cocq SS.CC.
- Bishop of Rarotonga, Cook Islands

Personal details
- Born: 6 May 1906 Tilburg, Netherlands
- Died: 22 January 1998 (aged 91) Cook Islands

Hendrick Joseph Cornelius Maria de Cocq, SS.CC. (6 May 1906 – 22 January 1998) was a Dutch prelate of the Roman Catholic Church. He served as Bishop of the Diocese of Rarotonga from 1966 until his resignation in 1971.

== Biography ==
=== Early life and priesthood ===
De Cocq was born in Tilburg, Netherlands, on 6 May 1906. He was ordained a priest of the Congregation of the Sacred Hearts of Jesus and Mary on 22 July 1931.

=== Episcopacy ===
On 10 February 1964, de Cocq was appointed Vicar Apostolic of the Cook Islands, and was also appointed Titular Bishop of Aquae in Byzacena. He was consecrated on 28 June 1964, with Bishop Reginald Delargey serving as principal consecrator. On 21 June 1966, he was appointed Bishop of Rarotonga, and he resigned on 28 April 1971.

De Cocq died on 22 January 1998 at the age of 91.

== Episcopal lineage ==
- Cardinal Scipione Rebiba
- Cardinal Giulio Antonio Santorio (1566)
- Cardinal Girolamo Bernerio, OP (1586)
- Archbishop Galeazzo Sanvitale (1604)
- Cardinal Ludovico Ludovisi (1621)
- Cardinal Luigi Caetani (1622)
- Cardinal Ulderico Carpegna (1630)
- Cardinal Paluzzo Paluzzi Altieri degli Albertoni (1666)
- Cardinal Gaspare Carpegna (1670)
- Cardinal Fabrizio Paolucci (1685)
- Cardinal Francesco Barberini (1721)
- Cardinal Annibale Albani (1730)
- Cardinal Federico Marcello Lante Montefeltro della Rovere (1732)
- Bishop Charles Walmesley, OSB (1756)
- Bishop William Gibson (1790)
- Bishop John Douglass (1790)
- Bishop William Poynter (1803)
- Bishop Thomas Penswick (1824)
- Bishop John Briggs (1833)
- Bishop William Bernard Ullathorne, OSB (1846)
- Archbishop Henry Edward Manning (1865)
- Archbishop Francis Redwood, SM (1874)
- Archbishop James Liston (1920)
- Bishop Reginald Delargey (1958)
- Bishop Hendrick Joseph Cornelius Maria de Cocq (1964)
