= Bob Leamy =

New Zealand bishop (1934–2022)

Bob Leamy SM
- Bishop of Rarotonga
- Diocese: Rarotonga
- Installed: 1 April 1984
- Term ended: 8 November 1996
- Predecessor: Denis Browne
- Successor: Stuart O'Connell

Personal details
- Born: Robin Walsh Leamy; 27 July 1934 Wellington, New Zealand
- Died: 1 January 2022 (aged 87) Auckland, New Zealand
- Motto: Cum Christo vinculum vestrum renovate (Renew your bond with Christ)

Robin Walsh Leamy SM (27 July 1934 – 1 January 2022) was a New Zealand Roman Catholic prelate.

== Biography ==
Born in Wellington to Cecil and Hazel Leamy, Leamy was one of five children. One of his sisters became a nun (Sister Patricia Leamy, Missionary Sisters of the Society of Mary). He was educated by the Brigidine Sisters and later by the Marist Fathers at St Patrick's College in Silverstream. He studied for the priesthood at the Marist Seminary in Greenmeadows, and was ordained on 21 July 1958.

Leamy served as Bishop of Rarotonga from 1984 to 1996. He resigned from that See on 8 November 1996 and was appointed Bishop Assistant and Vicar general of Auckland on that same day. He retired from that position in 2009 after 14 years' service.

Leamy died in Auckland on 1 January 2022, at the age of 87.

Catholic Church titles
Preceded by Denis Browne	Bishop of Rarotonga; 1984–1996	Succeeded by Stuart O'Connell
