= Peter Loy Chong =

The Most Reverend Peter Loy Chong
- Archbishop of Suva
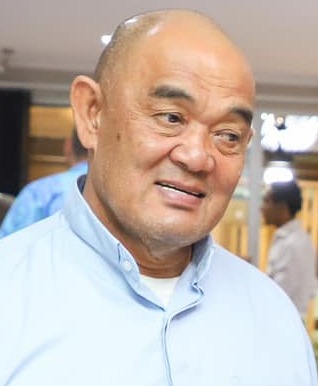
- Church: Catholic Church
- Archdiocese: Suva
- See: Suva
- Appointed: 19 December 2012
- Installed: 9 June 2013
- Predecessor: Petero Mataca
- Other post: President of the Federation of Catholic Bishops' Conferences of Oceania (2018-)

Orders
- Ordination: 11 January 1992 by Petero Mataca
- Consecration: 8 June 2013 by Petero Mataca

Personal details
- Born: Peter Loy Chong; 30 January 1961 (age 65) Natovi, Tailevu, Fiji
- Education: Graduate Theological Union
- Motto: To be Church in the world
- Coat of arms

Peter Loy Chong (born 30 January 1961 in Namata, Fiji, Tailevu) is the third Archbishop of Suva in Fiji (having been consecrated bishop on 8 June 2013). He worked on his doctorate at the Graduate Theological Union in Berkeley, California, United States.

Catholic Church titles
Preceded by Petero Mataca	Archbishop of Suva; 8 June 2013 – present	Succeeded by Incumbent
