= Diocese of Rarotonga =

Latin Catholic diocese in the Cook Islands

Diocese of Rarotonga Dioecesis Rarotongana
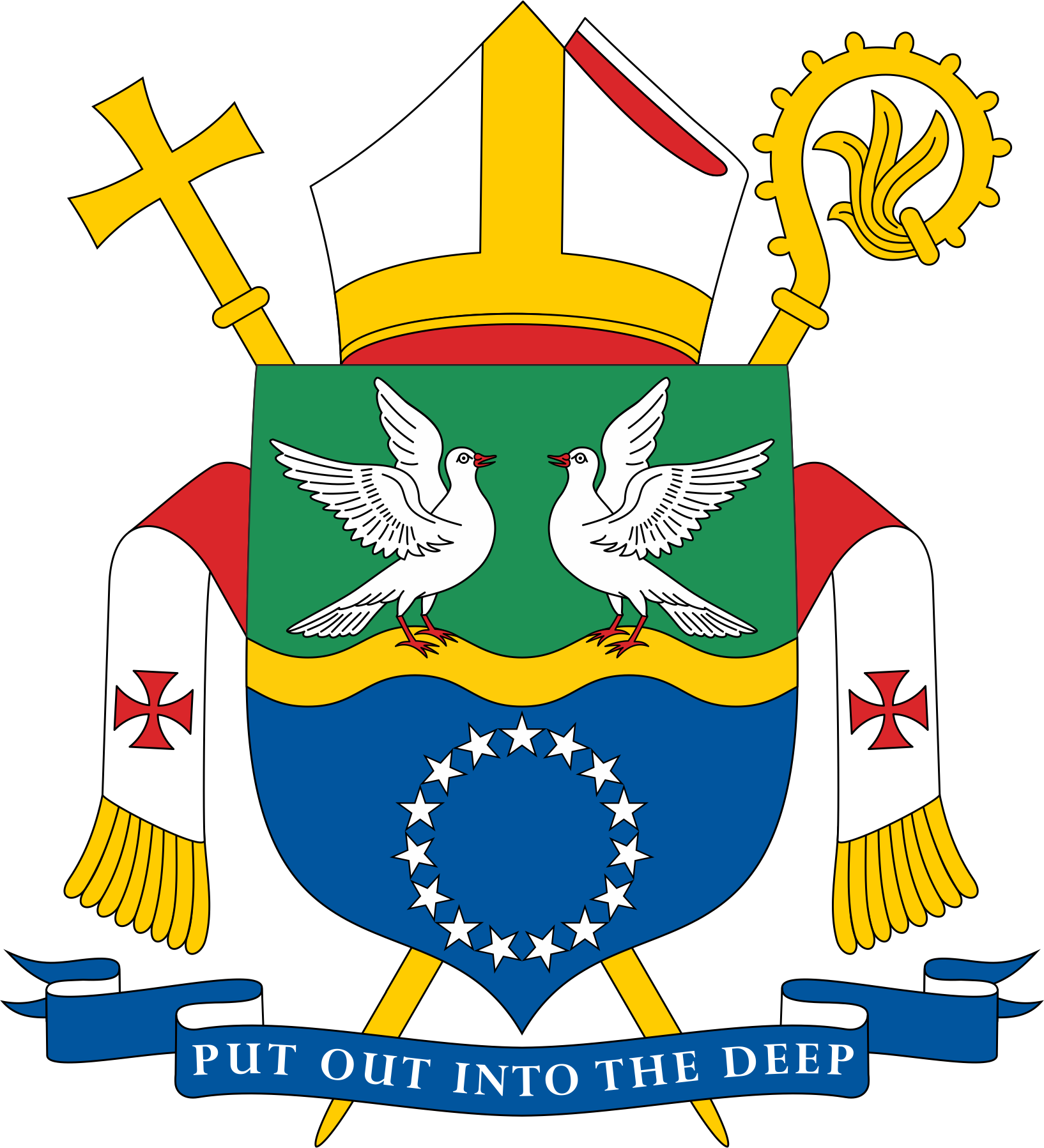
- Coat of arms

Location
- Country: Cook Islands, Niue
- Metropolitan: Suva

Statistics
- Area: 234 km^{2} (90 sq mi)
- Population: Total; Catholics: (as of 2017); 11,885; 2,255 (19.0%)
- Parishes: 15

Information
- Denomination: Catholic Church
- Sui iuris church: Latin Church
- Rite: Roman Rite
- Established: 21 June 1966
- Cathedral: Saint Joseph's Cathedral
- Patron saint: Saint Joseph
- Secular priests: 9

Current leadership
- Pope: Leo XIV
- Bishop: Reynaldo Bunyi Getalado
- Bishops emeritus: Paul Patrick Donoghue

The Diocese of Rarotonga (Latin: Dioecesis Rarotongana) in the Cook Islands is a Latin Catholic suffragan diocese of the Archdiocese of Suva in neighbouring Fiji. It was erected as the Prefecture Apostolic of Cook and Manihiki in 1922, elevated to the Vicariate Apostolic of Cook Islands in 1948 and elevated as the Diocese of Rarotonga in 1966. Niue is also part of the diocese, having been transferred from the Diocese of Tonga in 1972.

== Bishops ==
- Bernardin Castanié, C.I.M. (1923–1939)
- John David Hubaldus Lehman, C.I.M. (1939–1959)
- Hendrick Joseph Cornelius Maria de Cocq, SS.CC. (1964–1971)
- John Hubert Macey Rodgers, S.M. (1973–1977)
- Denis George Browne (1977–1983)
- Robin Walsh Leamy, S.M. (1984–1996)
- Stuart France O'Connell, S.M. (1996–2011)
- Paul Donoghue, S.M. (2011–2024)
- Reynaldo Getalado, M.S.P. (2024–present)

== Churches ==
Catholic Cathedral of Rarotonga (and the Cook Islands)

Saint Joseph's Cathedral in Avarua is the only Catholic cathedral in the Cook Islands.

The three other Catholic churches in Rarotonga are St Mary's in Arorangi Village, St Paul's in Titikaveka Village and Sacred Heart in Matavera village.

== Education ==
St Joseph's School in Rarotonga is now the only Catholic primary school. There was formerly St Mary's School on Mauke island, run by the Sisters of Our Lady of Nazareth until 1986, when they left and the Sisters of St Joseph of Cluny took over. The Cluny Sisters left Mauke at the end of 2001.

Nukutere College in Rarotonga is the Catholic secondary school (high school).
