= Archdiocese of Suva =

Latin Catholic archdiocese in Fiji

Coordinates: 18.1333°S 178.4330°E

Archdiocese of Suva Archidioecesis Suvana
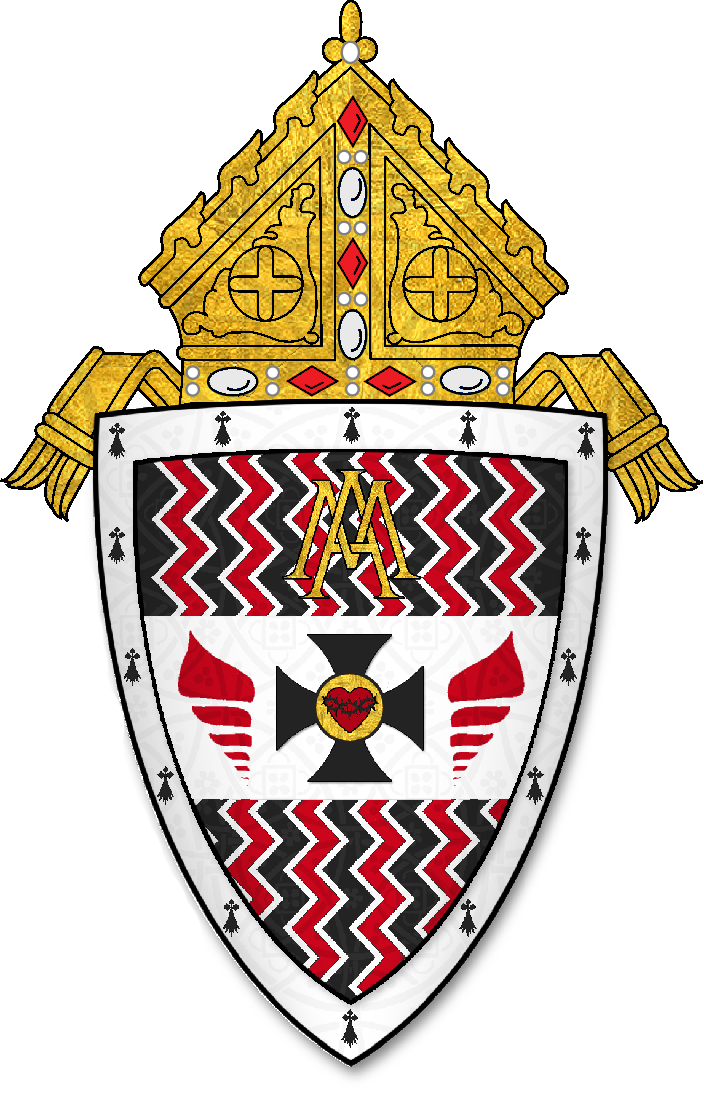
- Coat of Arms of the Archdiocese of Suva

Location
- Country: Fiji
- Metropolitan: Suva

Information
- Denomination: Catholic Church
- Sui iuris church: Latin Church
- Rite: Roman Rite
- Cathedral: Sacred Heart Cathedral, Suva

Current leadership
- Pope: Leo XIV
- Metropolitan Archbishop: Peter Loy Chong
- Suffragans: Diocese of Rarotonga; Diocese of Tarawa and Nauru; Mission Sui Iuris of Funafuti

The Archdiocese of Suva (Latin: Archidioecesis Suvana) is a Latin Catholic metropolitan archdiocese in Fiji. It is responsible for the suffragan dioceses of Rarotonga and Tarawa and Nauru and —as of 21 March 2003—the Mission Sui Iuris of Funafuti. The archdiocese was created in 1966 to succeed the Apostolic Vicariate of Fiji.

== History ==
The Fiji Islands were included in the territory of the old Vicariate Apostolic of Central Oceania, created by Propaganda Fide in 1842. The first Catholic mission in Fiji was founded in 1844, and on 10 March 1863, the territory was erected into a prefecture Apostolic. On 5 May 1887, the vicariate was established as the Vicariate Apostolic of Fiji (Latin: Vicariatus Apostolicus Insularum Fidgis) and entrusted to the Marist fathers. The first Apostolic vicar was Julian Vidal, titular Bishop of Abydos (consecrated 27 December 1887). Catholic missions soon were established on the islands Viti Levu, Ovalau, Vanua Levu, Taveuni, Kadavu and Rotuma, the official residence of the vicar Apostolic being at Suva on Viti Levu.

The statistics for the vicariate showed in the early 20th century, for about 250 islands, of which some 90 are inhabited; its total land area is 7,435 square miles (19,260 km^{2}), while the population in 1911 was 139,541 (3,707 Europeans; 87,096 autochthonous Fijians -of Melanesian (Papuan) stock, much crossed with Polynesian strains-; 4,286 Indians; the remainder of other eastern races): 30 priests (Marist Fathers), tending 18 central stations and 273 villages; 11 Little Brothers of Mary (Marist Brothers), in charge of a boarding and day school at Suva, a seminary and college at Cawaci and an English school for natives at Rewa; 24 European and 31 native Sisters of the Third Order of Mary (with 14 houses; novitiate at Solevu), conducting the majority of schools for girls; 8 sisters of St. Joseph of Cluny (2 houses), conducting the parochial school at Suva; 10 Sisters of the Holy Name of Mary (Marist Sisters), in charge of the school and orphanage at Levuka, a school at Ba, and assist the Marist brothers in the seminary and college at Cawaci; 12 native brothers (novitiate at Loretto) in 4 communities. The English college at Cawaci for the training of catechists and the children of the chiefs had 42 catechists, 80 boys and 12 girls. In the central stations the Marist brothers and sisters taught reading, writing etc., as well as religion, to 500 boys and 450 girls, while in the villages 315 catechists give elementary instruction to about 2000 children. The churches and chapels numbered 65, and the total -minoritarian- Catholic population about 12,000 (300 Europeans). A station for lepers was conducted on Makogai Island by one Marist father and two sisters of the Third Order of Mary.

In 1966 it was promoted as Metropolitan Archdiocese of Suva, which has three suffragans on other island states: Rarotonga (Cook Islands), Tarawa (Kiribati) and Nauru (both last-named states are independent).

Caritas Fiji is the social arm of the Archdiocese. It became a member of both Caritas Oceania and Caritas Internationalis in 2019.

== Bishops ==
=== Ordinaries ===
Bishops

- Jean-Baptiste Bréhéret (1863–1887)
- Julien Vidal (1887–1922)
- Charles-Joseph Nicolas (1922–1941)
- Victor Frederick Foley (1944–1967)

Archbishops

- George Hamilton Pearce (1967–1976)
- Petero Mataca (1976–2012)
- Peter Loy Chong (since 2013)

=== Coadjutor vicar apostolic ===
- Charles-Joseph Nicolas (1918–1922)

=== Auxiliary bishop ===
- Petero Mataca (1974–1976), appointed Archbishop here

== 21st century ==
According to the most recent census in 2007, 9.1% of the population were Catholic. Figures in 2020 stated this had gone down to 7.36%.

== Sex abuse cases ==
On 13 July 2020, New Zealand's 1News revealed that of some of the clergy who were accused in 1,300 cases of sexually abusing children in the nation of Fiji were originally from New Zealand before they were transferred. The transfer of these priests is the subject of a Royal Commission investigation. Dr Murray Heasley from the Network of Survivors in Faith Based Institution told 1News that Fiji was a common place for the New Zealand Catholic Church to transfer accused Catholic clergy. Despite Archbishop Peter Loy Chong's statement that there had been no reported cases of clergy abusing children in Fiji, Australian priest Julian Fox, who was later convicted and jailed in 2015 for child sex crimes, had been transferred to Fiji in 1999 after Australian police started an investigation against him. It was also proven that the church had knowledge of sex abuse allegations against Fox nine years before he was charged.

== See also ==
- Catholic Church in Fiji
- Religion in Fiji
