= Roman Catholic Archdiocese of Samoa-Apia =

Latin Catholic archdiocese in Samoa

Coordinates: 13.8321°S 171.7660°W

Archdiocese of Samoa-Apia Archidioecesis Samoa-Apiana Puleaga Fa'aAkiepikopo Samoa-Apia
- Immaculate Conception Cathedral

Location
- Country: Samoa
- Ecclesiastical province: Samoa-Apia

Statistics
- Area: 2,922 km^{2} (1,128 sq mi)
- Population: Total; Catholics: (as of 2010); 189,000; 42,500 (22.5%)
- Parishes: 38

Information
- Denomination: Catholic
- Sui iuris church: Latin Church
- Rite: Roman Rite
- Established: 20 August 1850 (175 years ago)
- Cathedral: Cathedral of the Immaculate Conception

Current leadership
- Pope: Leo XIV
- Archbishop: Most Rev. Mosese Vitolio Tui

Map
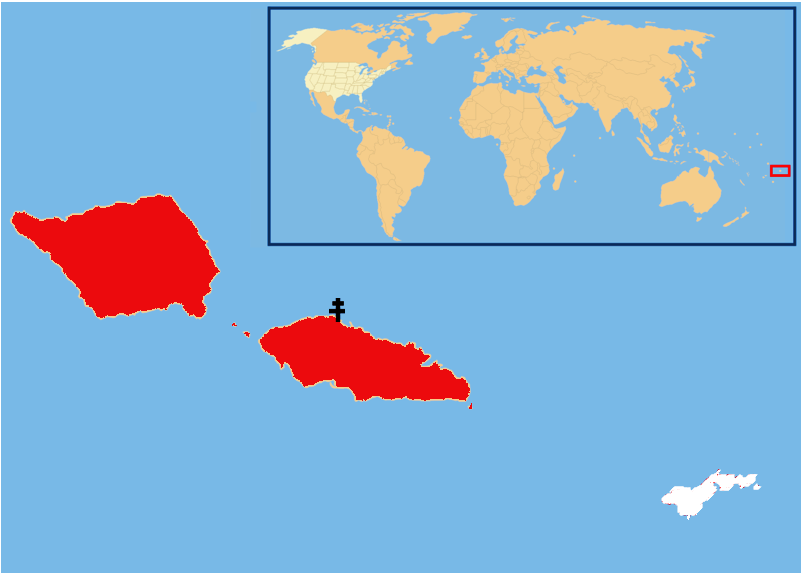
- Territory of the Archdiocese of Samoa-Apia

The Archdiocese of Samoa-Apia (Latin: Archidioecesis Samoa-Apiana; Samoan: Puleaga Fa'aAkiepikopo Samoa-Apia) is a Latin Catholic ecclesiastical jurisdiction consisting of the Independent State of Samoa.

== History ==
In 1842, the Propaganda Fide created the Apostolic Vicariate of Central Oceania that included New Caledonia, Tonga, Samoa and Fiji Islands. This lost territory with establishment by canonical erection by the Holy See on August 20, 1850, of the Vicariate Apostolic of the Navigators' Archipelago, entrusted to the Society of Mary (Marists). On January 4, 1957, the Vatican changed the name of the Vicariate Apostolic to Samoa and the Tokelau Islands.

The vicariate apostolic was elevated to the Diocese of Apia on June 21, 1966, and made suffragan to the metropolitan see of Suva, Fiji. On August 10, 1974, the name of the diocese was changed to Diocese of Apia o Samoa and Tokelau; and it was changed again on December 3, 1975, to the Diocese of Samoa and Tokelau.

On September 10, 1982, the diocese was elevated to the dignity of an archdiocese taking the name of the See city, Apia. Simultaneously, the Diocese of Samoa–Pago Pago was created from a portion of the former Diocese of Samoa Tokelau and made suffragan to the metropolitan see of Apia.

On 24 April 2023, Archbishop Alapati Lui Mataeliga was airlifted to Auckland Hospital, in New Zealand and died in the early hours of the following morning.

== Ordinaries ==
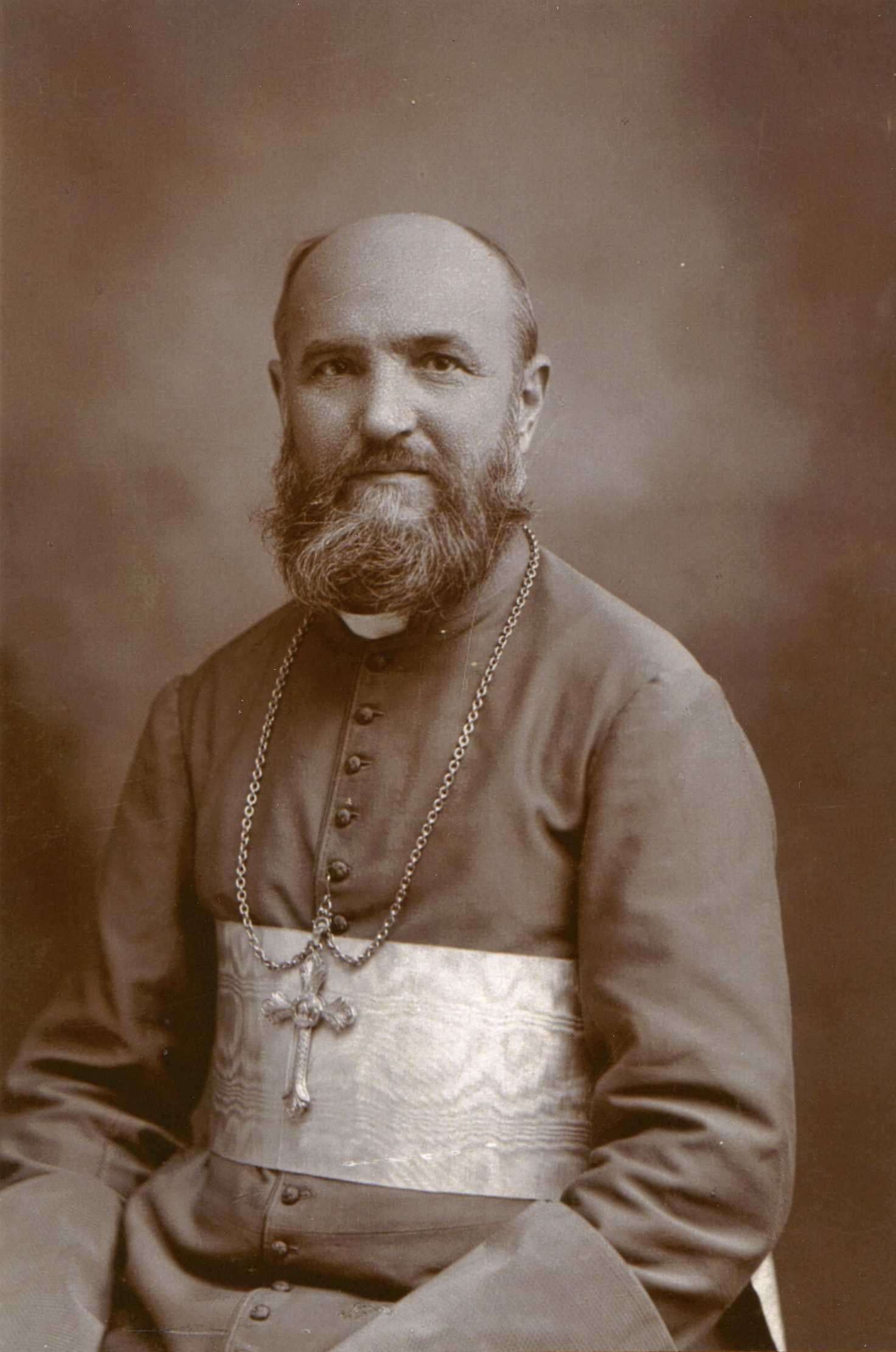
Monseigneur Pierre-Jean Broyer

- Guillaume Marie Douarre S.M. (1850-1853)
- Pierre Bataillon, S.M.(1853–1870)
- Aloys Elloy, S.M. (1870–1878)
- Jean-Armand Lamaze, S.M. (1879–1896)
- Pierre-Jean Broyer S. M. (1896–1918)
- Joseph Darnand S. M. (1919–1953)
- Jean Baptiste Dieter S. M. (1953–1955)
- George Hamilton Pearce S. M. (1956–1967), appointed Archbishop of Suva, Fiji, Pacific (Oceania)
- Pio Taofinu'u S. M. (1968–2002), elevated to Cardinal in 1973
- Alapati Lui Mataeliga (2002–2023)
- Mosese Vitolio Tui (2024-present)

== Ecclesiastical province ==
See: Ecclesiastical Province of Samoa-Apia.

As the metropolitan see, the archdiocese has two suffragans: the Diocese of Samoa–Pago Pago and the Mission Sui Iuris of Tokelau. Until March 2003, the Mission Sui Iuris of Funafuti was also a suffragan, but since that date it is now a suffragan of the Archdiocese of Suva.

== See also ==
- Catholic Church by country
- Catholic Church in the United States
- Ecclesiastical Province of Samoa-Apia
- Global organisation of the Catholic Church
- List of Catholic archdioceses (by country and continent)
- List of Catholic dioceses (alphabetical) (including archdioceses)
- List of Catholic dioceses (structured view) (including archdioceses)
- List of the Catholic dioceses of the United States
