= Mission Society of the Philippines =

Catholic society of apostolic life

The Mission Society of the Philippines (MSP) (Latin: Societas Missionaria Philippinarum) is a clerical society of apostolic life of pontifical right of the Latin Catholic Church. Members of the society append the post-nominal letters M.S.P. to their names.

== History ==
The first project for the establishment of a missionary society was presented in January 1964 to the Catholic Bishops' Conference of the Philippines (CBCP) by Epifanio Surban Belmonte, the then-Bishop of Dumaguete.

It was established by the CBCP, the country's episcopal body, in 1965 as the official and chief missionary arm of the Catholic Church in the Philippines.

On May 1, 1965, Cardinal Lorenzo Antonetti, in Tayud, blessed the ground and laid the foundation stone of what would become the motherhouse of the institute (the foundation was made to coincide with the fourth centenary of the evangelization of the Philippines).

After obtaining the nihil obstat of the Congregation for the Evangelization of Peoples (CEP) (November 30, 1977), on March 26, 1978, the archbishop of Cebu, Julio Rosales y Ras, issued the decree erecting the society.

The Society received its pontifical right status on January 6, 2009, from the CEP.

== Activities and distribution ==
The Society currently works in twelve countries and territories on five continents. It has missions in Asia in Thailand, Taiwan, Japan and South Korea; in Oceania, in Papua New Guinea, Australia, New Zealand, and The Cook Islands; in Europe, in the Netherlands and in England; in the United States of America; and in South America, in Guyana. The generalate is in Makati.

At the end of 2015, the society had 86 members (69 of whom were priests) and 45 houses.
