= James Whyte (bishop) =

- Bishop of Dunedin
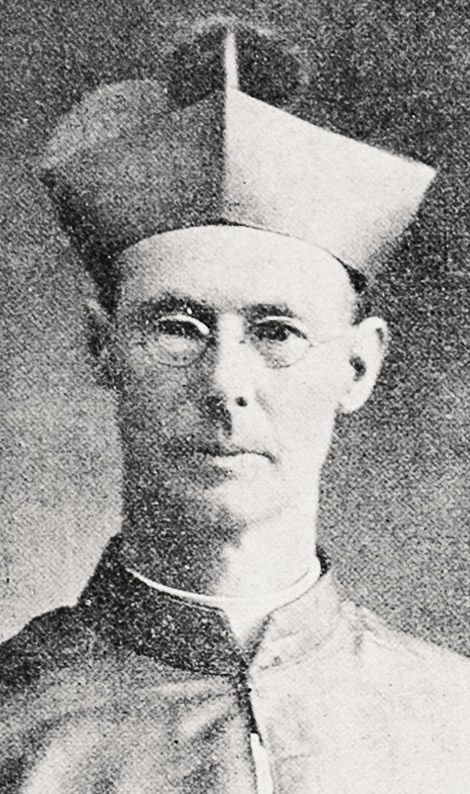
- Church: Catholic Church
- Diocese: Diocese of Dunedin
- In office: 22 April 1920 – 26 December 1957
- Predecessor: Michael Verdon
- Successor: John Kavanagh

Orders
- Ordination: 3 July 1892
- Consecration: 12 December 1920 by Francis Redwood

Personal details
- Born: 12 October 1868 Kilkenny, County Kilkenny, United Kingdom of Great Britain and Ireland
- Died: 26 December 1957 (aged 89) Dunedin, Peninsula County, New Zealand, British Empire

James Whyte (12 October 1868 – 26 December 1957) was the third Roman Catholic Bishop of Dunedin (1920–1957).

== Early life ==
Whyte was born in County Kilkenny, Ireland in 1868. He spent six years (from 1886 to 1892) in ecclesiastical training for the priesthood at St Kieran's College, Kilkenny. He was ordained a priest in Kilkenny on 3 July 1892.

== Career ==
Whyte went to Sydney in 1892 and was appointed a professor at St Patrick's College, Manly. The rector there at the time was Dr Michael Verdon, later second Bishop of Dunedin. Among Whyte's students were Matthew Brodie later second Bishop of Christchurch and James Liston later seventh Bishop of Auckland.

After leaving that position he was assistant priest at St Benedict's Church and at St Mary's Cathedral. In Sydney, he also held the positions of Archdiocesan Inspector of Schools, Chancellor of the Sydney archdiocese and Director of the Catholic Press. He was also the first resident priest of Stanmore. Whyte was very learned and he spoke three foreign languages, French, German and Italian.

== Episcopate ==
In 1920 Whyte was appointed Bishop of Dunedin and on the 12th day of December in that year he was consecrated by Archbishop Redwood in St. Joseph's Cathedral, Dunedin with James Liston who had been appointed Coadjutor Bishop of Auckland. During Whyte's episcopate the number of priests in the diocese doubled from 40 to 81; there was a similar increase in the children attending Catholic schools, from 3060 to 6120. He aided the Christian Brothers in establishing St. Kevin's College, Oamaru in 1927. He added 14 new parishes to the 22 existing in 1920. Religious orders commencing work in the Dunedin diocese over the same period were the Vincentians (who took over Holy Cross seminary in 1934), the Dominican Fathers, the Redemptorist Fathers, the Presentation Sisters, the Sisters of St. Joseph of Cluny and the Sisters of the Assumption.

In 1935, he was awarded the King George V Silver Jubilee Medal.

Whyte was chairman of directors of the New Zealand Tablet Company for many years and was active in promoting the cause of the Catholic press in New Zealand. On 18 December 1941 Whyte suffered a stroke and was taken to the Mater Misericordiae Hospital where he remained for the last 16 years of his life. In July 1942 the golden jubilee of Whyte's ordination was celebrated bringing visitors from all parts of New Zealand. The jubilee Mass was celebrated by Archbishop O'Shea and at the jubilee dinner an ode written by the New Zealand poet Eileen Duggan was read out.

Whyte celebrated his diamond jubilee in 1952, while his silver jubilee as a bishop was marked in December, 1945, by ceremonies of an entirely religious nature. In January 1943 Hugh John O'Neill was appointed as Coadjutor Bishop of Dunedin, but ill health forced his resignation in 1946. In 1949 John Kavanagh was appointed as Apostolic Administrator "sede plena" and coadjutor with the right of succession.

== Death ==
Whyte died on 26 December 1957, aged 89. He had been a priest for 65 years and a bishop for 37 years. His body lay in state at St Joseph's Cathedral until a solemn requiem Mass was celebrated on 30 December 1957, attended by all the hierarchy of New Zealand, and a large concourse of clergy and laity. His pall-bearers were six Christian Brothers. He was buried in the Southern Cemetery, Dunedin.

Catholic Church titles
Preceded by Michael Verdon	3rd Bishop of Dunedin; 1920–1957	Succeeded by John Kavanagh
