= Verdon College =

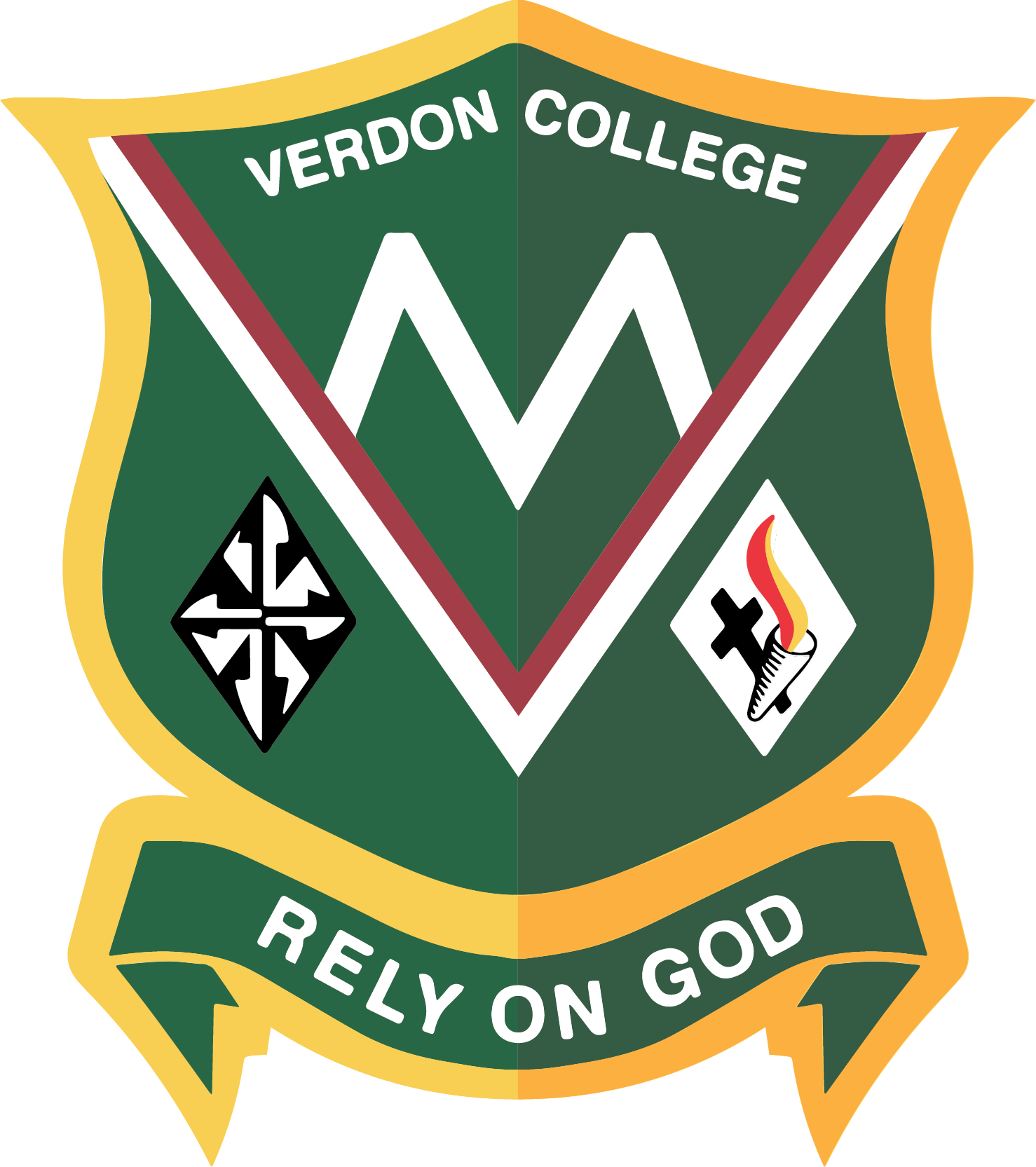

Location
- 210 Rockdale Road; Invercargill, Southland; New Zealand; 46.4161°S 168.3955°E

Information
- Type: State-Integrated co-educational secondary
- Motto: Rely on God
- Established: 1981; 45 years ago
- School district: Newfield
- Ministry of Education Institution no.: 408
- Chairman: Ian Sutherland
- Principal: Jarlath Kelly
- Chaplain: Fr Jaewoo Lee
- Grades: Years 7–13
- Enrolment: 696 (July 2026)
- Hours in school day: 6
- Houses: Catherine; Dominic; Marian; Marcellin
- Song: The Verdon Anthem
- Socio-economic decile: 6N
- Affiliations: Roman Catholic, Marist Brothers, Dominican Sisters
- Website: verdoncollege.school.nz

Verdon College is a co-educational Roman Catholic high school in Invercargill, New Zealand, teaching students from year 7 to 13 (ages 11–18). The College is named after Bishop Michael Verdon (1838–1918) who was the second Catholic Bishop of Dunedin (1896–1918).

In 2024, 86.4% of Year 11 students achieved NCEA Level 1,88.6% of Year 12 students achieved NCEA Level 2, and 78.8% of Year 13 students achieved NCEA Level 3. In 2023, 11 students were given at least one Vocational Pathway Award.

== History ==
Verdon College is a co-educational Catholic secondary school, established in 1982 through the 1981 amalgamation of St Catherine's College (a single-sex high school for girls operated by the Dominican Sisters) and Marist College (single-sex high school for boys operated by the Marist Brothers).

The Marist College site (which became Verdon College) was built on former farmland at the eastern boundary of Invercargill and opened in 1969. The new combined Catholic high school was named after Bishop Verdon. Due to the school's growth parts of the school are located on what used to be Cargill High and Te Wharekura o Arowhenua.

St Catherine's College dates back to 1882.

=== Bishop Verdon Block ===
In the mid-2000s, Verdon college acquired a gymnasium and a full-sized S68 design classroom block on the site of the former Cargill High School. A multimillion-dollar refurbishment of the acquired classroom block was completed in 2008 and named the Bishop Verdon Block, mainly for the year seven and eight students. It also contains two computer suites, a library, a science laboratory, and a study atrium.

== Enrolment ==
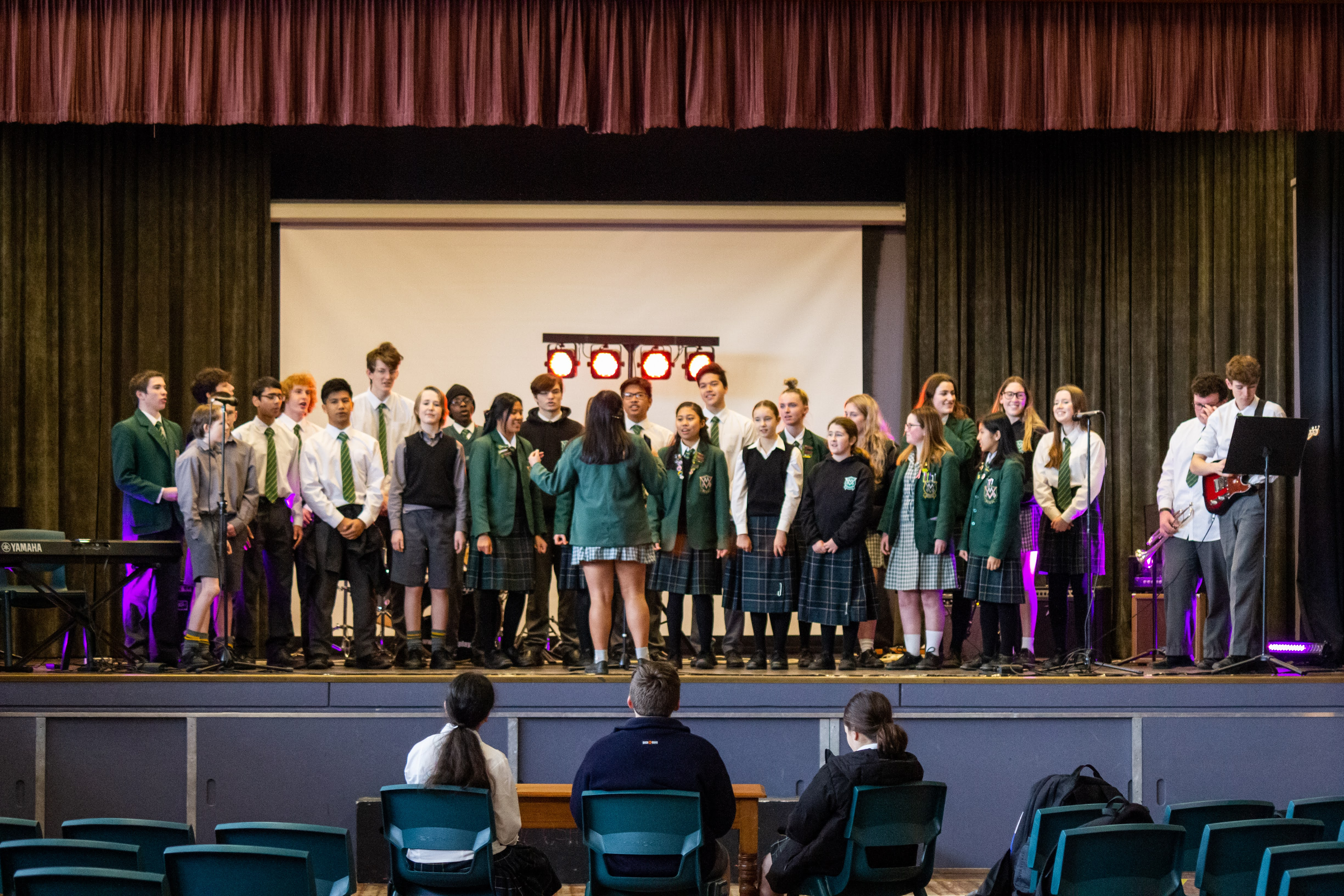
Students practicing for the House Choir competition

As of July 2026, Verdon College has a roll of 696 students, of which 138 (19.8%) identify as Māori.

The college offers a broad range of educational opportunities for student achievement in the areas of sport and culture as well as a diverse academic curriculum.

As of 2026, the school has an Equity Index of 464, placing it amongst schools whose students have average socioeconomic barriers to achievement (roughly equivalent to deciles 5 and 6 under the former socio-economic decile system).

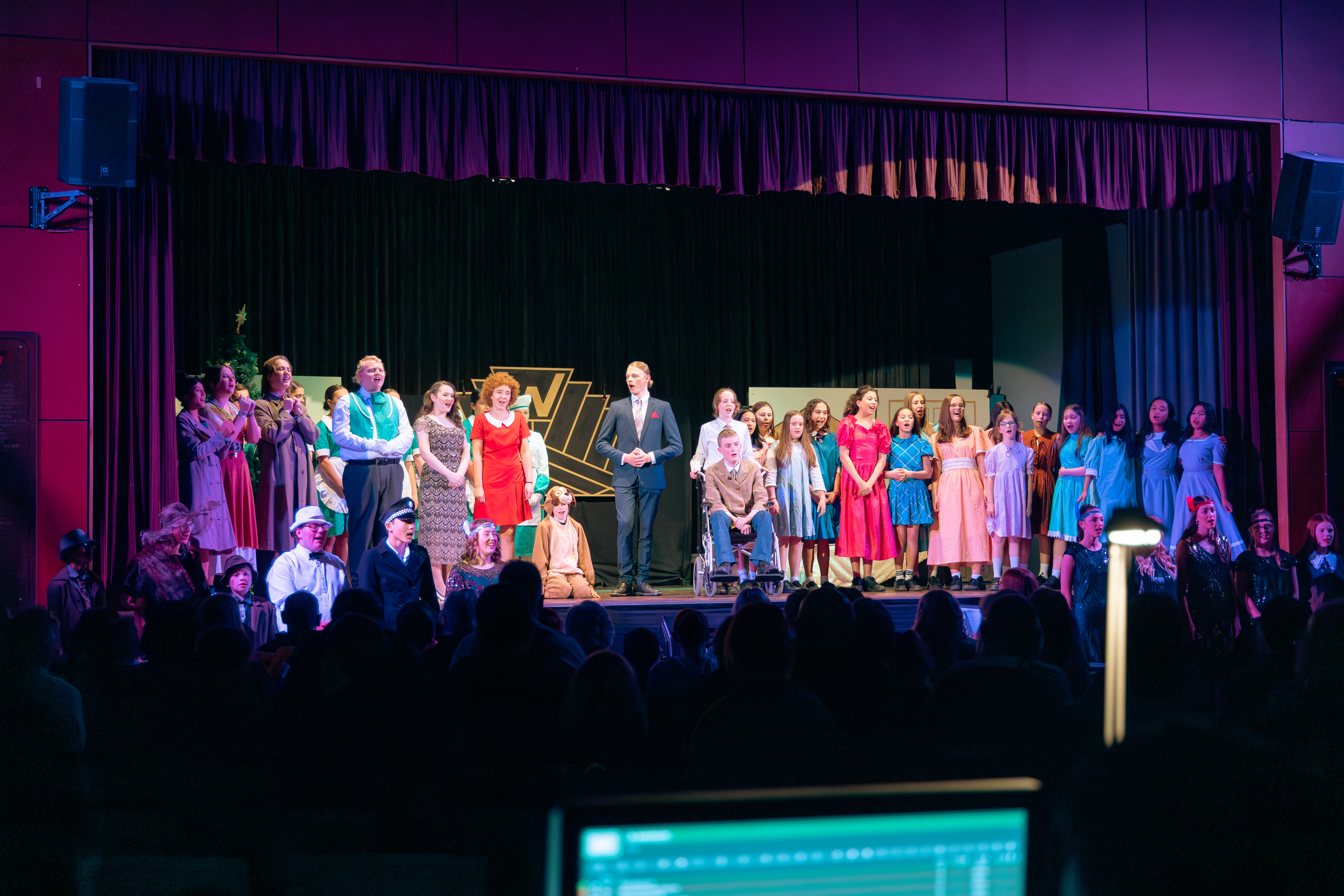
Cast members for Annie Jr performing bows

== Cultural Activities ==
- Bishop's Shield – Inter-school debating, scripture reading, public speaking and drama. They compete against the other Catholic schools in the Dunedin Diocese: St. Kevin's, Oamaru, Trinity Catholic College, Dunedin, and St Peter's College, Gore.
- Inter-house Choir – Houses compete to win house points by performing a set song, as well as a song of their choice.
- Inter-house Drama – Competitions are held each year for the best drama performance from each house, with house points going to the winning house.
- Inter-house Haka – Each house performs the school haka, as well as a set song and a chosen waiata for house points. The 2022 competition is available to watch here: https://www.youtube.com/watch?v=mFQPZ3ybdnI
- Inter-house Lip Sync – Junior (year 7–10) students from each house choreograph and perform a dance routine to a song of their choice. As the competition is held in the second last week of the Junior school year, the winning performers house receives house points that are carried onto the next year.
- Music Festival – Students compete in various junior/senior categories including: vocals, instrumental and group.
- Production –
  - Back to the 80s (musical) was performed in 2017.
  - Saturday Night Fever (musical) was performed in 2018.
  - All Shook Up (musical) was performed in 2019.
  - School of Rock (musical) was to be performed in 2020, however due to the impact of COVID-19 the production was performed in 2021.
  - In 2022, a mash-up of previous productions and other famous Broadway musicals such as Joseph and the Amazing Technicolor Dreamcoat were performed.
  - Annie Jr was performed in 2023.
  - The Wizard of Oz was performed in 2024.
  - Newsies (musical) was performed in 2025.
  - High School Musical will be performed in 2026.
- Sheilah Winn Shakespeare Festival – Each year, a number of students are selected to perform in the regional competition (Southland) against other schools in the area.

Other regional and national cultural competitions that students compete in are:

- Chamber Music Festival
- ILT Southland Secondary Schools' Jazz Fest
- Rock Quest
- Sound Quest
- Southern Jam Youth Jazz Festival

== Sport ==
=== Sporting Activities ===
- House Athletics Day – Interhouse athletics competition where houses compete for house points.
- Southland-Wide Under 18 Competition – Verdon competes with other Southland secondary school First XV rugby teams in a competition spanning from April until August. Notable competition wins include the 2012 in which Verdon beat St Peter's College 15–12 in the final.
- New Zealand Secondary Schools Netball – The Verdon Senior A Netball team are regular participants at the New Zealand Secondary Schools Netball competition and have won the nationwide tournament twice.
- Quad Tournament – Verdon competes in an annual tournament weekend with St Peter's College, Kavanagh College, St Kevin's College and Roncalli College. Verdon has yet to have won a tournament weekend so far. There are both senior and junior tournaments, both at opposite ends of the winter season.
- Swimming sports – Every year, students compete in various water sports for house points.
- Year 12 vs Year 13 Rugby League – Each year, the two year groups battle for the unofficial title of the winners of the League Cup. This event is organised by the students.

=== Sports offered at the College ===
Verdon offers many sporting opportunities for the students, such as:

- Badminton
- Basketball
- Cricket
- Cycling
- Dance
- Football
- Futsal
- Hockey
- Indoor
- Bowls
- Netball
- Rugby
- Softball
- Squash
- Volleyball
- Waterpolo

== Aerial Imagery ==
These images are of the Marist College now Verdon College site.

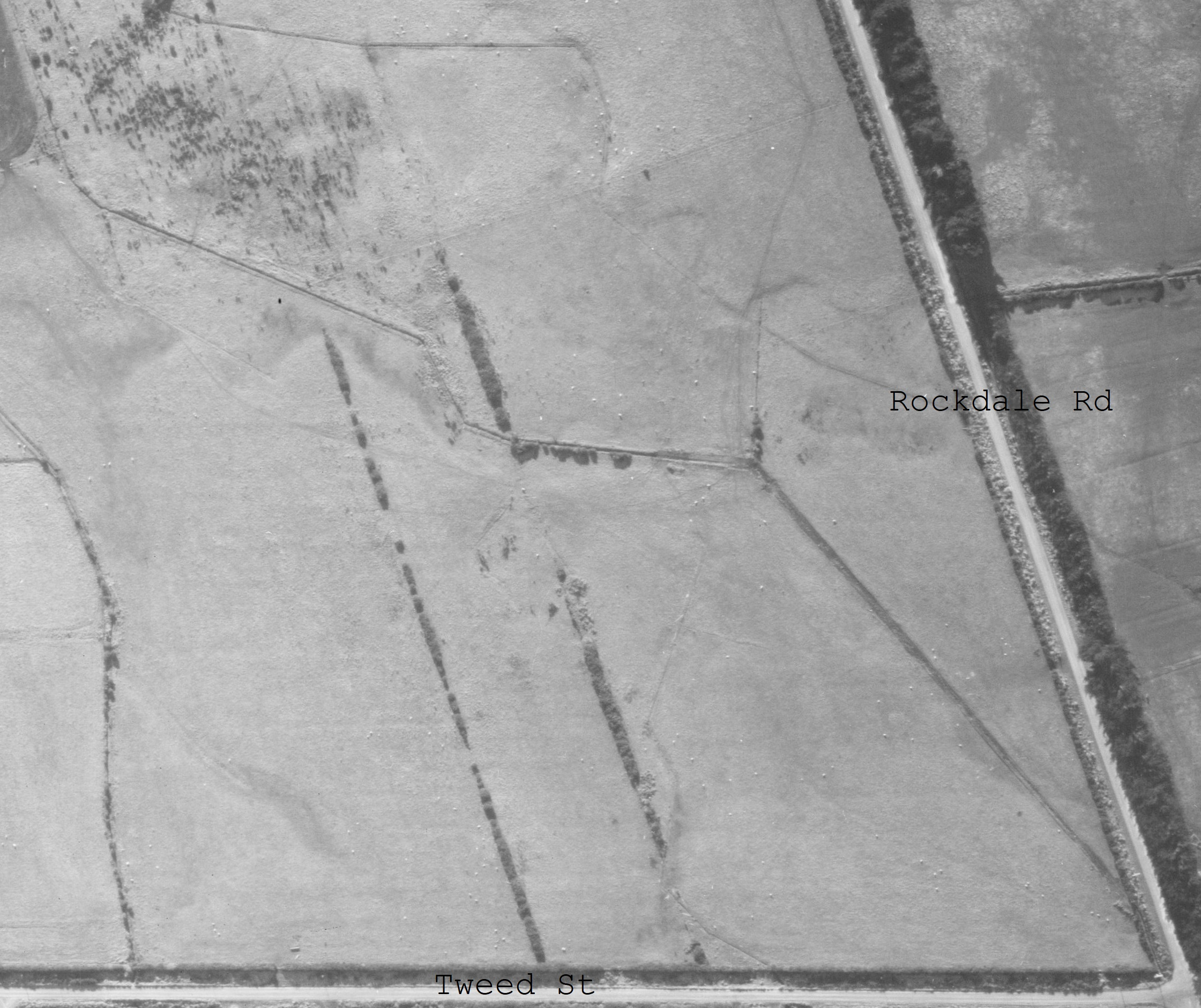
1946

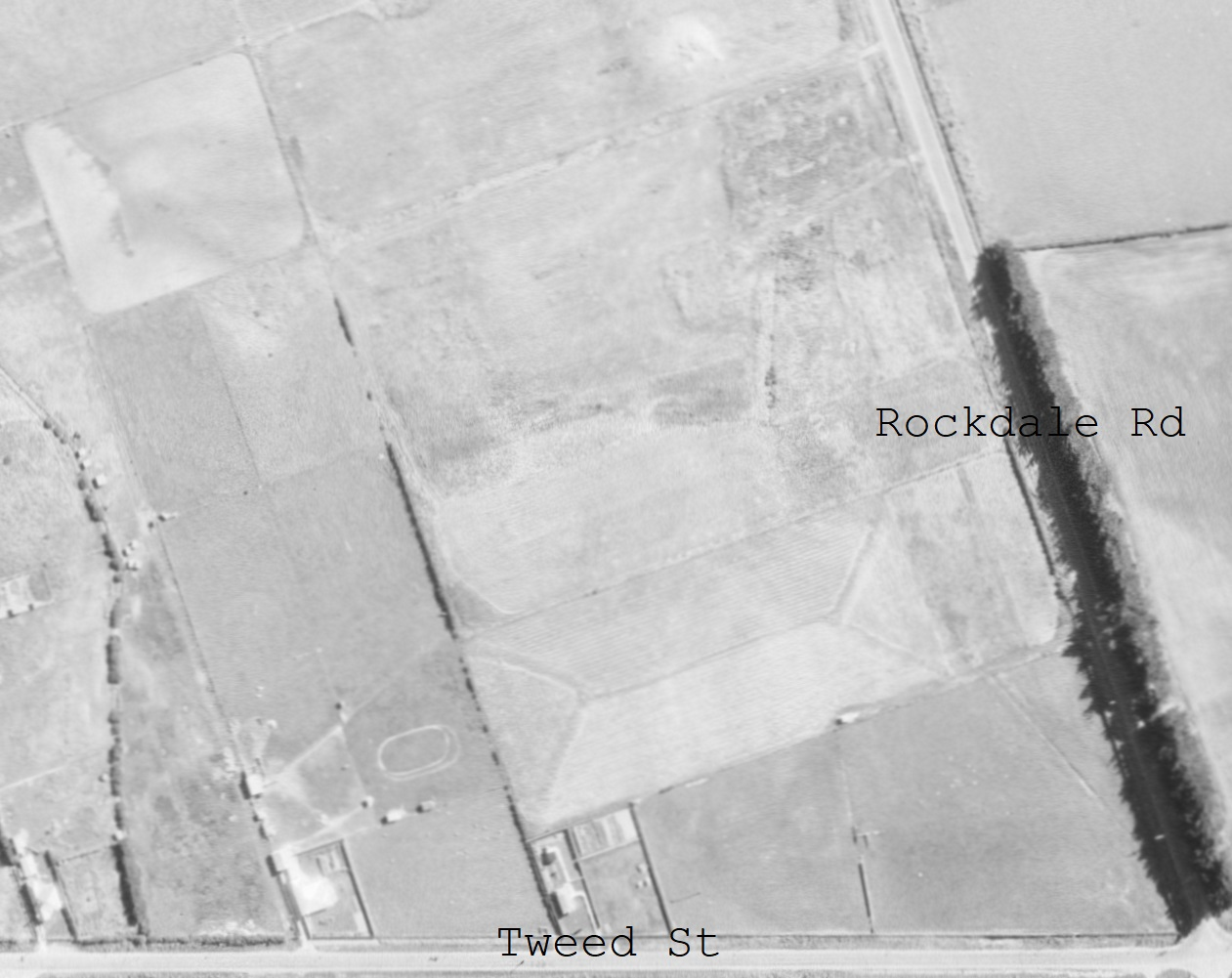
1956

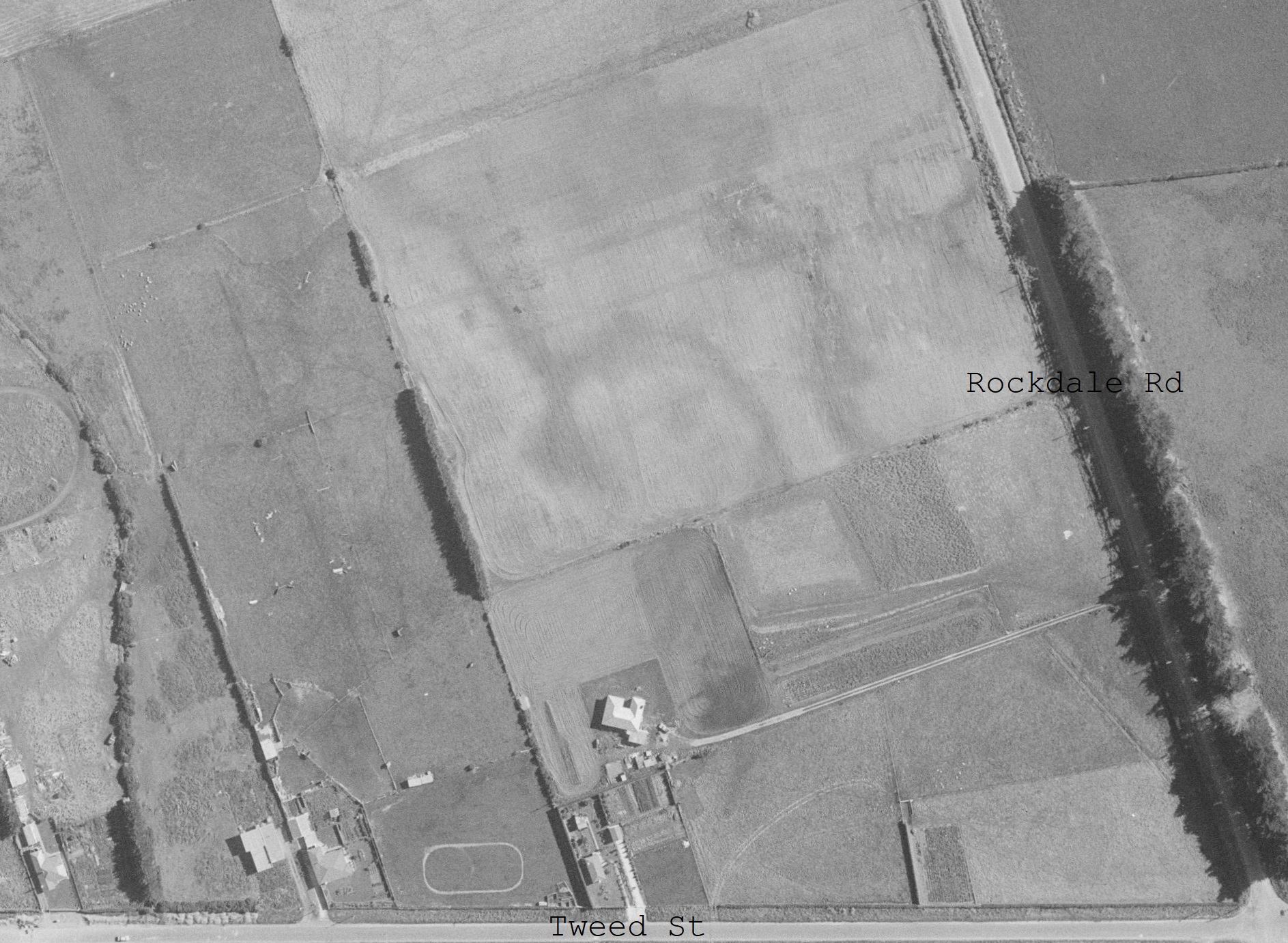
1962

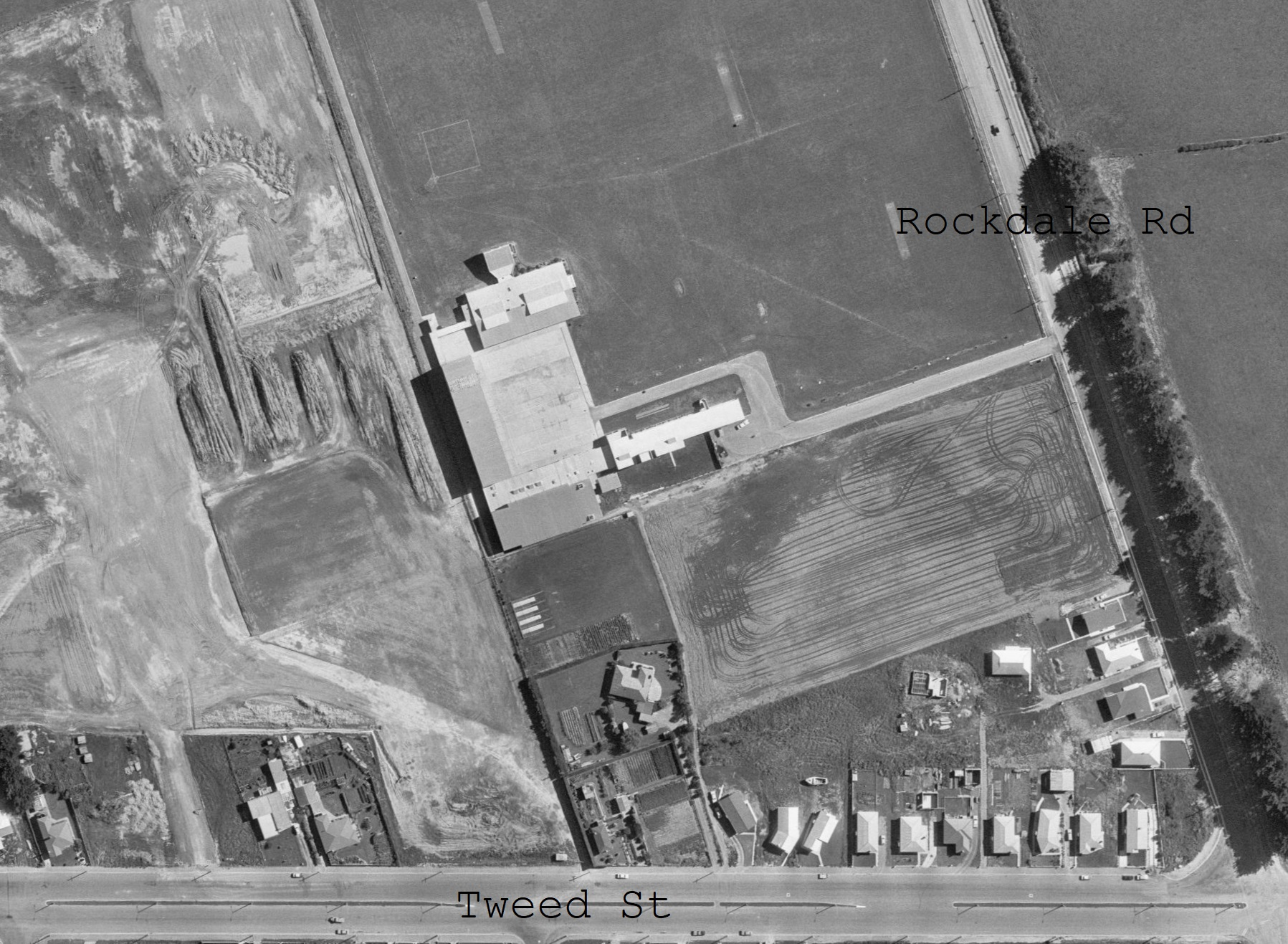
1974

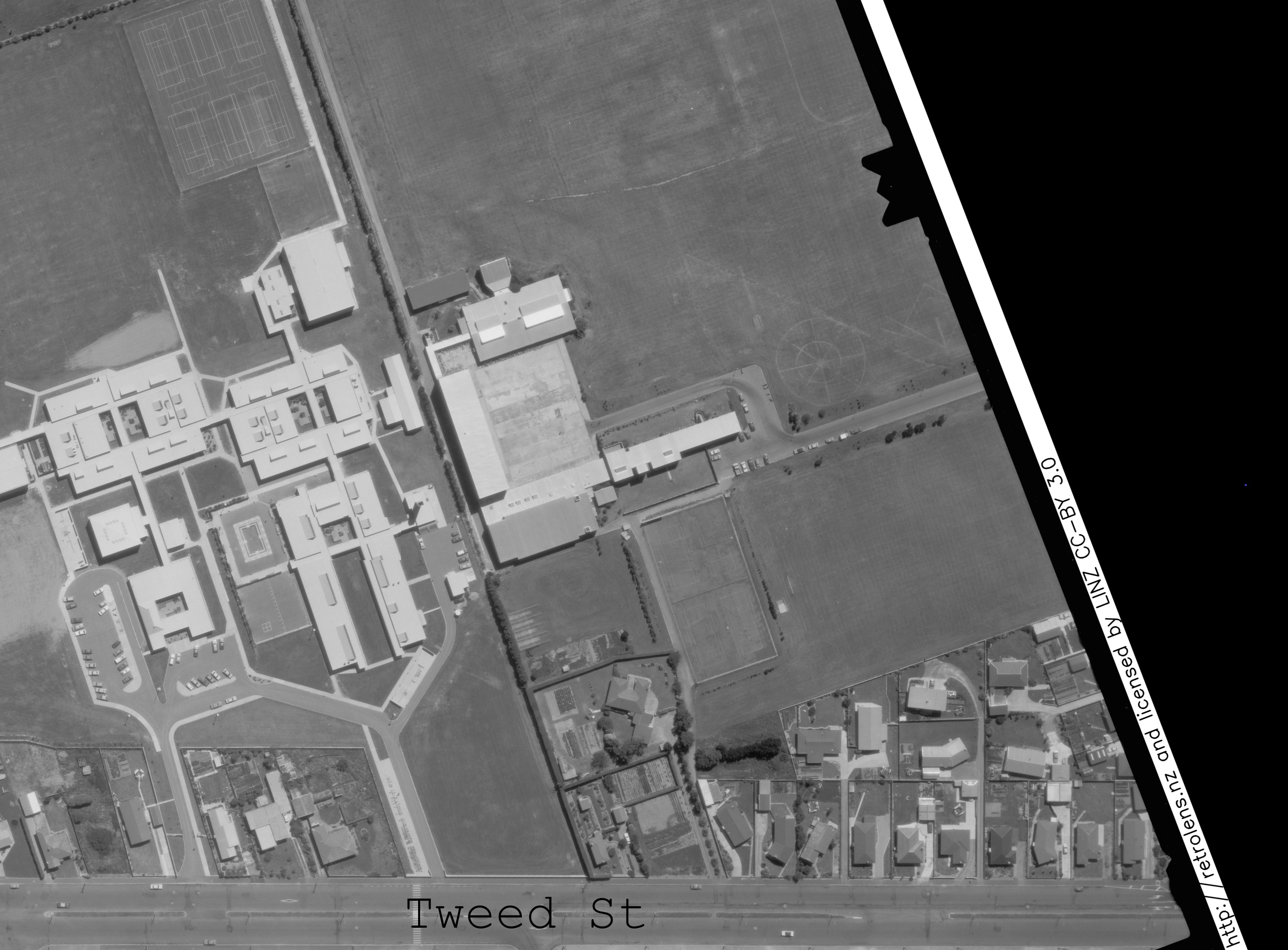
1981

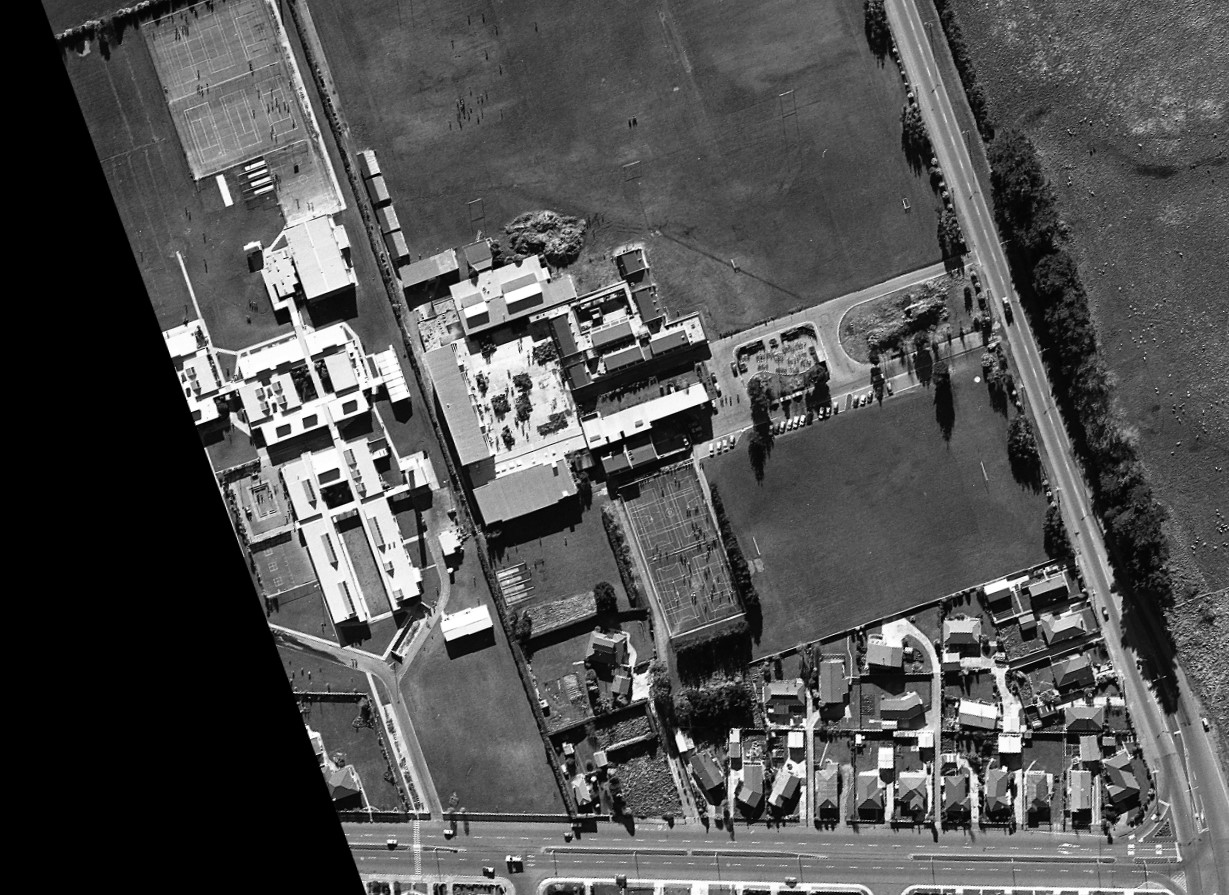
1988

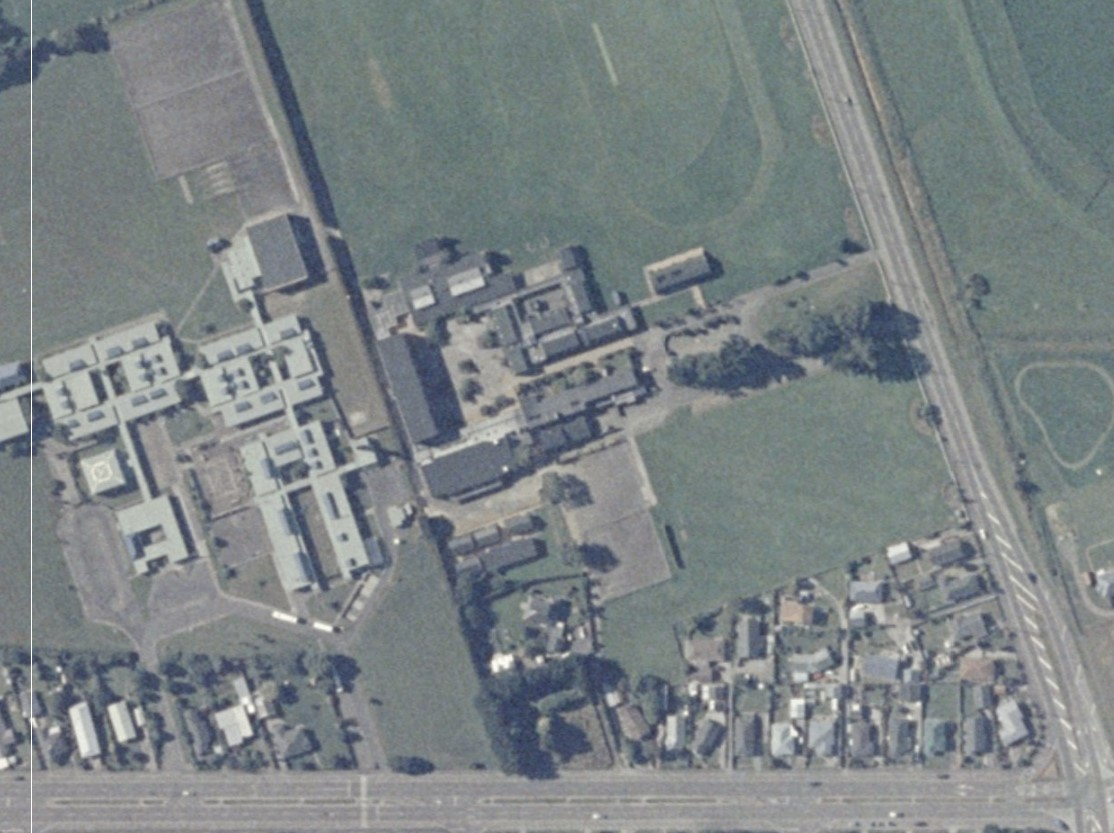
2005-2011

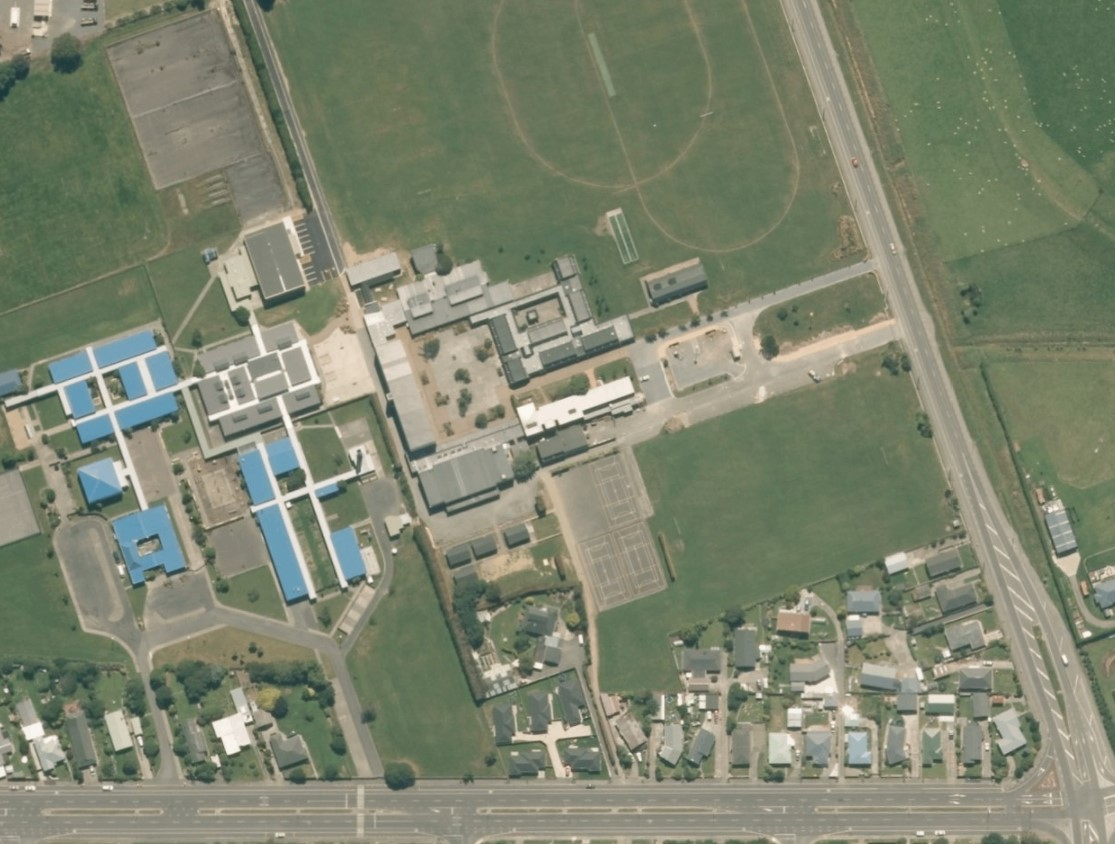
2013-2014

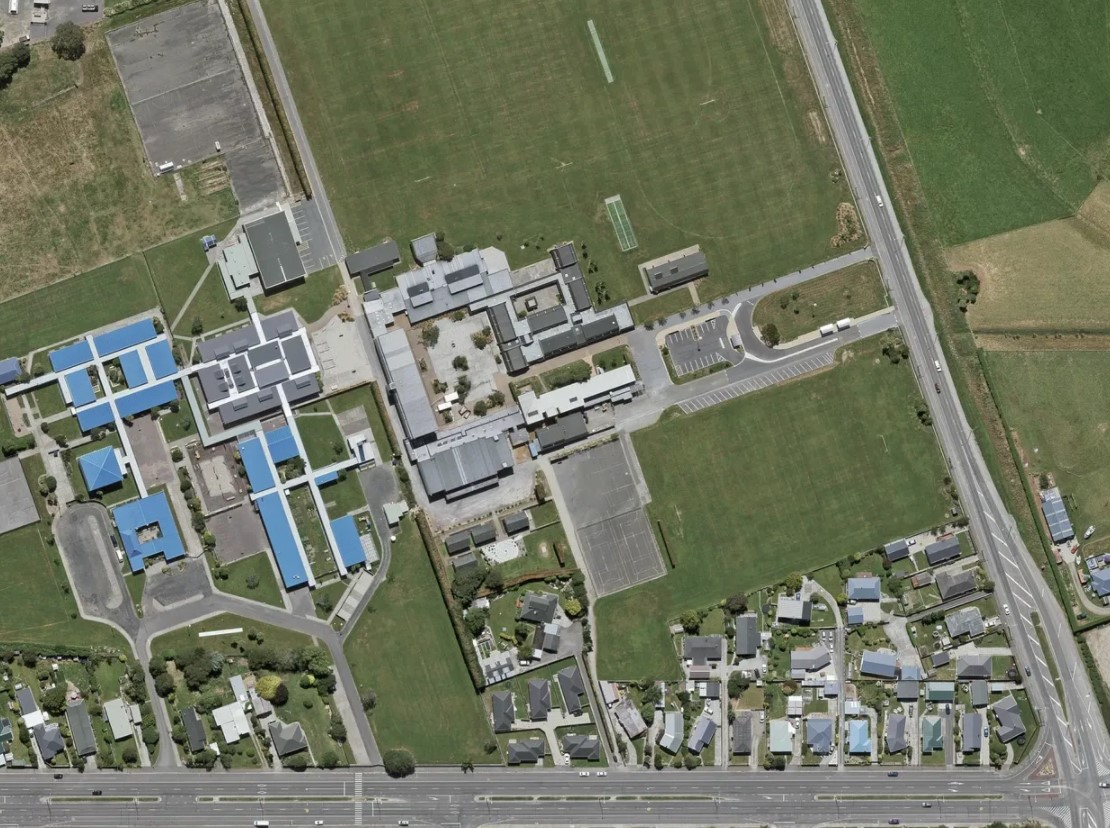
2017

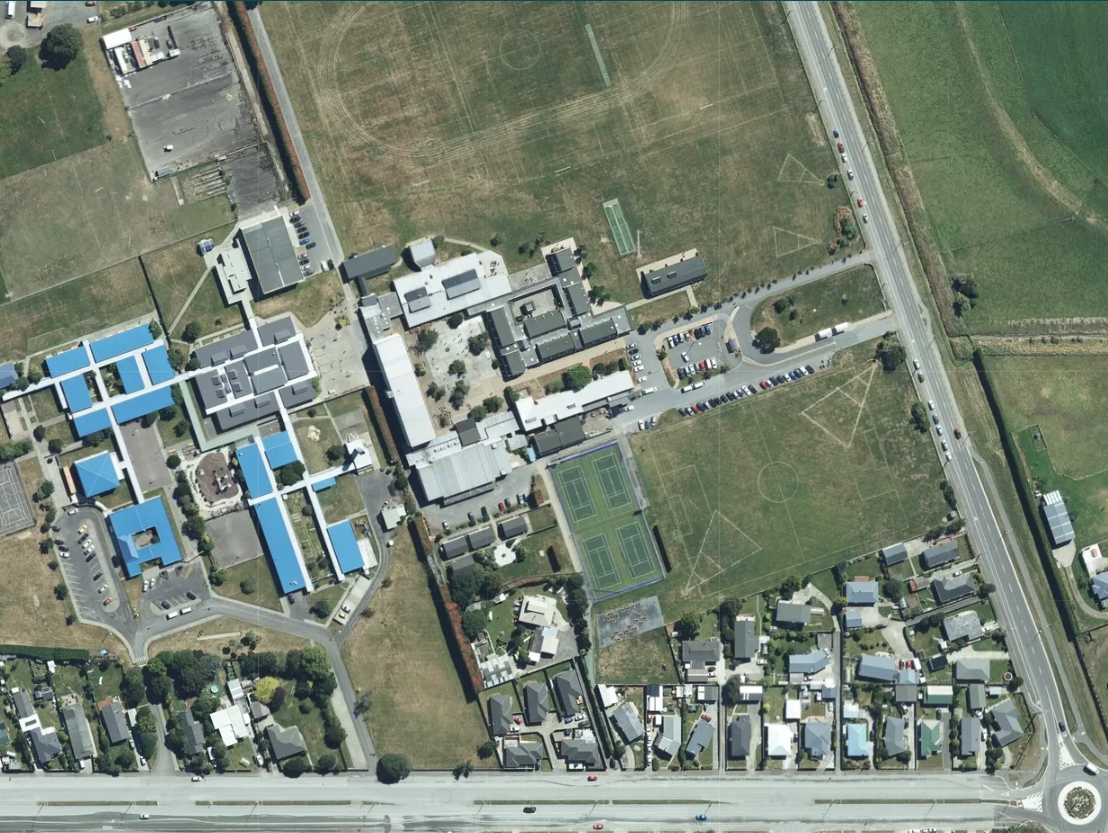
2022

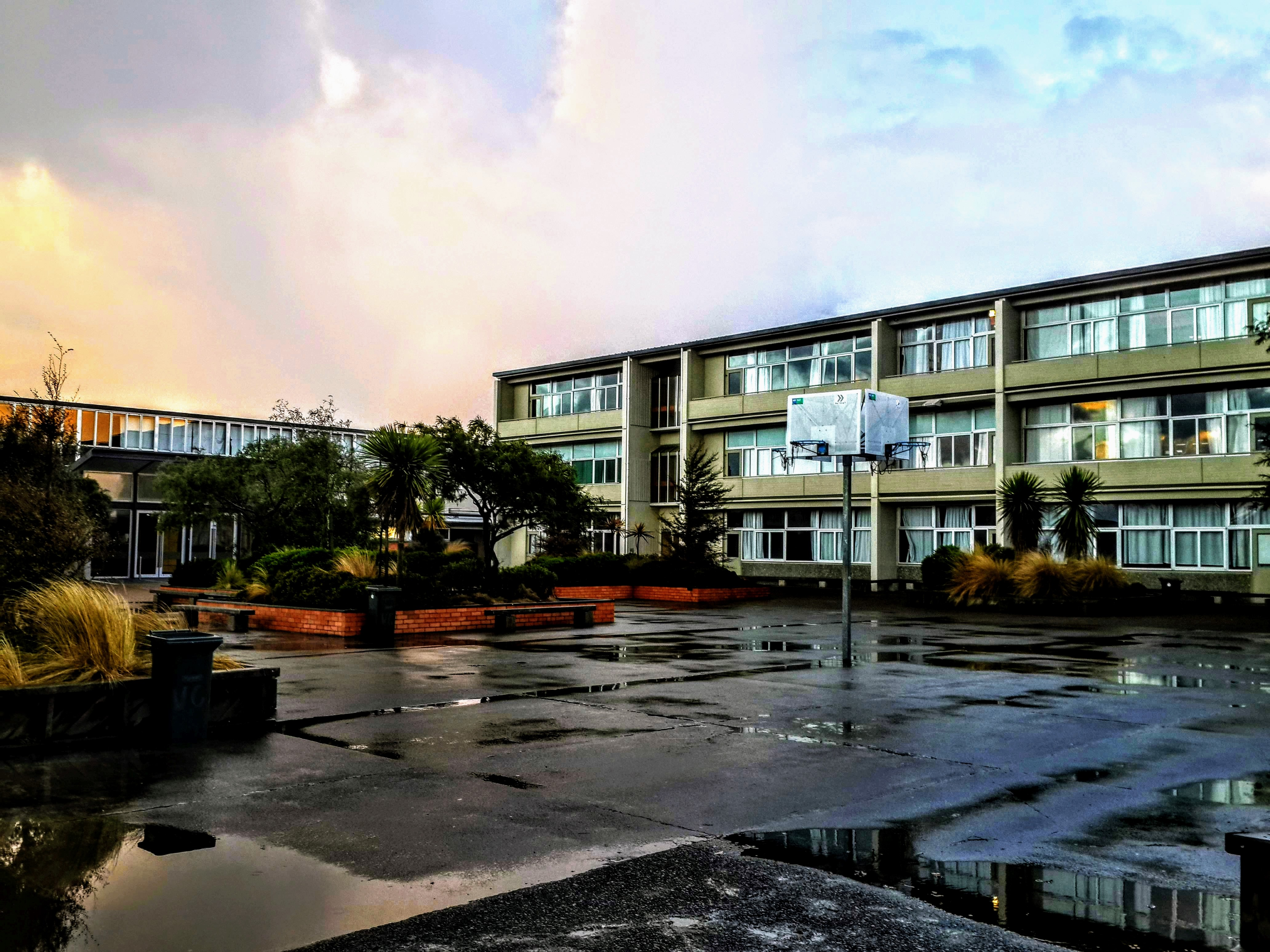
The "Quad" and Dominic Block

== Notable students ==
Ex-pupils of Verdon College or its predecessor schools, St Catherine's College and Marist College.

- Dion Bates – Current Southland Stags rugby union player
- Dan Buckingham – Olympic Paralympian athlete
- John Burke (born 1946) – former mayor of Porirua City (Marist)
- Colin Campbell (born 1941) - Roman Catholic Bishop of Dunedin (2004–2018) (Marist)
- Dan Davin (1913-1990) – soldier, writer, publisher (Marist)
- Aliyah Dunn – New Zealand netball international
- Wendy Frew – New Zealand netball international
- Jess Hamill – New Zealand Paralympics competitor and Commonwealth Games shot put silver medalist
- Te Huinga Reo Selby-Rickit – New Zealand netball international
- Tom Scully – Professional cyclist
- Douglas Sekone-Fraser – 2009 New Zealand Weightlifting Champion, Silver and Bronze in 2011 for the New Zealand Weightlifting Championships and 16th in the Junior World Championships
- Hua Tamariki – rugby union player

== Sources ==
- Pat Gallager, The Marist Brothers in New Zealand Fiji & Samoa 1876–1976, New Zealand Marist Brothers' Trust Board, Tuakau, 1976.
- Sister Mary Augustine McCarthy O.P., Star In The South: The Centennial History of the New Zealand Dominican Sisters, St Dominic's Priory Dunedin, 1970.
- K P Wanden & G R Latta The Marist Brothers in Invercargill, 1897-1997, Marist Jubilee Committee, Invercargill, 1997.
