= Colin Campbell (New Zealand bishop) =

New Zealand Roman Catholic bishop

The Most Reverend Colin Campbell
- Bishop Emeritus of Dunedin
- Archdiocese: Archdiocese of Wellington
- Diocese: Roman Catholic Diocese of Dunedin
- Installed: 29 April 2004
- Term ended: 22 February 2018
- Predecessor: Leonard Boyle
- Successor: Michael Dooley

Orders
- Ordination: 27 June 1966 (as priest) by John Kavanagh
- Consecration: 9 July 2004 (as bishop) by Leonard Boyle

Personal details
- Born: Colin David Campbell; 21 September 1941 (age 85) Otautau, New Zealand
- Denomination: Roman Catholic Church
- Residence: Auckland, New Zealand
- Occupation: Roman Catholic bishop
- Profession: Cleric
- Education: Holy Name Seminary, Christchurch; Holy Cross College, Mosgiel; Massey University

Colin David Campbell (born 21 September 1941) is a New Zealand Roman Catholic bishop. He was the sixth bishop of the Roman Catholic Diocese of Dunedin from 2004 until 2018, when he reached the retirement age of 75. In 2023 he was the interim rector of Holy Cross Seminary in Auckland.

== Early life and education ==
Campbell was born in Otautau, New Zealand, and educated at St Therese's Convent School in Invercargill (Dominican sisters) and at Marist Brothers' Primary and Marist Brothers' High schools, Invercargill, before training as a priest at Holy Name Seminary, Christchurch, and Holy Cross College, Mosgiel. He carried out further studies in London and Trier, Germany. He has a B.A. degree from Massey University.

== Priesthood ==
Campbell was ordained a priest in Dunedin by Bishop Kavanagh on 27 June 1966. He was assistant priest at St. Joseph's Cathedral, Dunedin and at Tainui (1967), in Mornington (1970–72), St. Joseph's Cathedral (1972), in Invercargill 1973–1977, and in Georgetown (1977–79). He was parish priest at Bluff (1979–86), St. Joseph's Cathedral (1986–92), at Green Island (1992–95), at Waikiwi (1995-2000) and rector at Holy Cross Seminary, Auckland (2001–04).

== Episcopacy ==
Campbell was appointed the sixth Bishop of Dunedin by Pope John Paul II on 29 April 2004. He was then ordained by his predecessor, Leonard Anthony Boyle, at Dunedin's Town Hall on 9 July 2004.

=== Resignation ===
Campbell's resignation as Bishop of Dunedin was accepted by Pope Francis on 22 February 2018 and his successor, Michael Dooley, was appointed on the same day.

Catholic Church titles
Preceded by Leonard Boyle	6th Bishop of Dunedin; 2004–2018	Succeeded by Michael Dooley
