= Diocese of Dunedin =

Diocese of Dunedin may refer to:

- Anglican Diocese of Dunedin, a geographical area of the Anglican Church, in New Zealand
- Roman Catholic Diocese of Dunedin, a geographical area of the Roman Catholic Church, in New Zealand
