= Michael Dooley =

20th and 21st-century Catholic Bishop of Dunedin

The Most Reverend Michael Dooley
- 7th Bishop of Dunedin
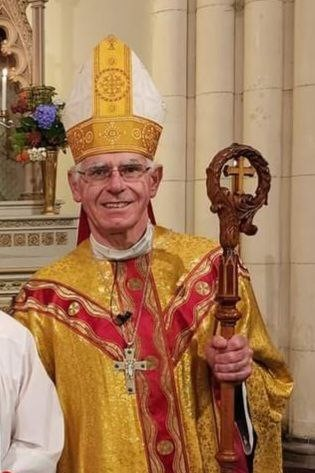
- Bishop Dooley in 2023
- Archdiocese: Archdiocese of Wellington
- Diocese: Roman Catholic Diocese of Dunedin
- Installed: 27 April 2018
- Predecessor: Colin Campbell

Orders
- Ordination: 13 December 1989 by Leonard Boyle
- Consecration: 26 April 2018 by Colin Campbell

Personal details
- Born: Michael Joseph Dooley; 13 December 1961 (age 64) Invercargill, New Zealand
- Denomination: Roman Catholic Church
- Parents: Joseph Dooley and Mary Hogan
- Occupation: Roman Catholic bishop
- Profession: Cleric
- Education: University of Otago; Holy Cross Seminary; Melbourne College of Divinity
- Motto: Trust in God
- Coat of arms: Michael Dooley's coat of arms

Styles of Michael Dooley
- Reference style: The Most Reverend
- Spoken style: Your Excellency
- Religious style: Bishop

Ordination history of Michael Dooley
History
Priestly ordination
- Ordained by: Leonard Boyle
Episcopal consecration
- Principal consecrator: Colin Campbell
- Co-consecrators: Cardinal John Dew; Archbishop Martin Krebs

Michael Joseph Dooley (born 13 December 1961) is a New Zealand prelate of the Roman Catholic Church. He was appointed as the 7th Bishop of Dunedin, New Zealand on 22 February 2017, ordained bishop on 26 April 2018 and installed on 27 April 2018.

== Early life and education ==
Dooley was born in Invercargill, the son of Joseph Dooley and Mary Hogan. He was educated at Heddon Bush Primary School and Central Southland College, Winton. He completed an apprenticeship as a fitter and turner before studying for a Bachelor of Theology at Otago University while he was at Holy Cross Seminary, then located at Mosgiel. He then completed a Master of Theology at Melbourne College of Divinity.

== Priesthood ==
Dooley was ordained as a priest by Bishop Leonard Boyle on 13 December 1989, at St Peter & St Paul Church, Nightcaps. Dooley was an assistant priest at St. Mary's Basilica, Invercargill and at Gore. After completing his master's degree in theology in Melbourne, he was parish priest of Mosgiel where he was also Director at the Holy Cross Formation Centre. He then became Formator and Spiritual Director at Holy Cross Seminary in Auckland. On returning to Dunedin, he was again parish priest of Mosgiel and Green Island. He was appointed vicar general of the Dunedin diocese in 2016.

== Episcopacy ==
On 22 February 2018, Dooley was appointed by Pope Francis to succeed Colin Campbell, on his retirement, as the 7th Bishop of Dunedin.

Dooley was ordained Bishop on 26 April 2018 and installed the next day. The principal consecrator was his predecessor, Colin Campbell and the principal co-consecrators were Cardinal Dew and Archbishop Martin Krebs, the Apostolic Nuncio.

== Approach ==
Dooley has said that he follows Pope Francis' views that instead of having a fortress mentality, it was better to engage with the world with a positive message of what the church may offer, like the gospel, to people in their everyday lives and to help the vulnerable in society and the poor which are "definitely what [Pope Francis] would want us to be more concerned about."

Dooley has expressed his opposition to euthanasia.

Catholic Church titles
Preceded by Colin Campbell	7th Bishop of Dunedin; 2018–present	Succeeded by incumbent
