= Matthew Brodie =

The Right Reverend Matthew Joseph Brodie
- 2nd Bishop of Christchurch
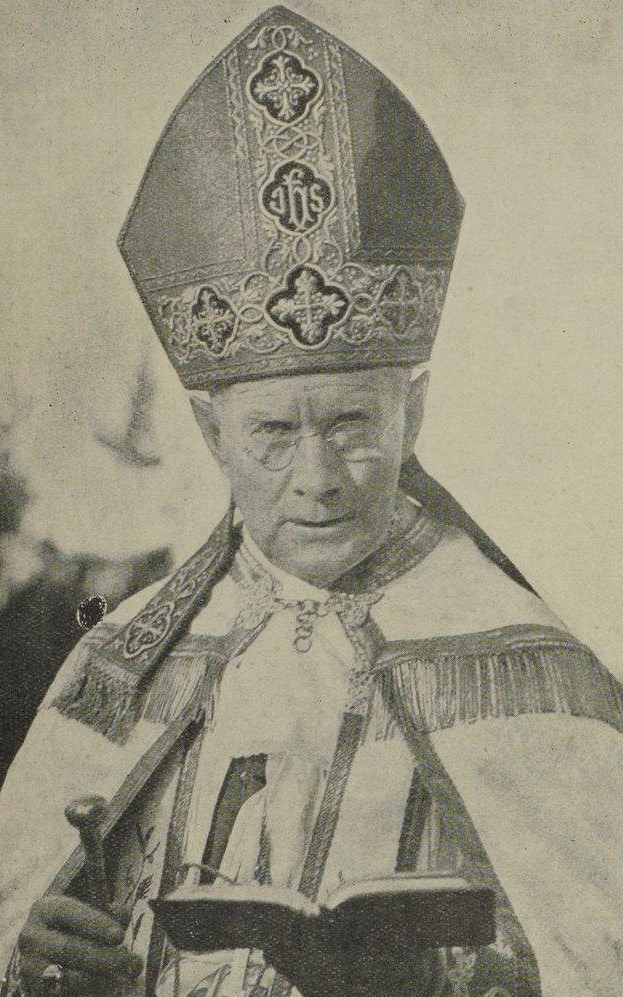
- Bishop Brodie at the consecration for St Joseph's Church, Darfield
- Church: Catholic Church
- Archdiocese: Wellington
- Diocese: Christchurch
- Appointed: 27 November 1915
- Installed: 27 February 1916
- Term ended: 11 October 1943
- Predecessor: John Joseph Grimes
- Successor: Patrick Francis Lyons

Orders
- Ordination: 20 December 1896 by George Lenihan
- Consecration: 27 February 1916 by Bonaventura Cerretti

Personal details
- Born: 1871 Coromandel, New Zealand
- Died: 11 October 1943 (aged 72) Christchurch, New Zealand
- Buried: Mount Magdala Cemetery

Matthew Joseph Brodie (1871 – 11 October 1943) was the second Catholic bishop of Christchurch, New Zealand. He was appointed by Pope Benedict XV on 27 November 1915 and died in office on 11 October 1943. He was the first New Zealander by birth to be made a Catholic bishop. He was noted for his interest in promoting the general well-being of all.

== Early life ==
Brodie was born in Coromandel, New Zealand, in 1871. His parents were Irish immigrants to New Zealand. He received his early education in Coromandel and at the "Pitt St School" (St Peter's School). He was then sent to Sydney for his secondary education at St Joseph's College, Hunters Hill and he then trained as a priest at St Patrick's College, Manly where one of his professors was Michael Verdon. He was ordained a priest for the Diocese of Auckland in St Patrick's Cathedral, Auckland by Bishop Lenihan on 20 December 1896.

== Priesthood ==
Brodie first served as curate at St Benedict's Church, Newton, Auckland and then at the village of Puhoi. He was the first Parish Priest at Waihi. Brodie was at Waihi at the time of the 1912 Waihi miners' strike and he made personal efforts which contributed to its settlement. He was effective because he was respected by all the parties. After leaving Waihi, he was Administrator at St Patrick's Cathedral and then Parish Priest at Parnell. He was also latterly the Vicar general of the Auckland Diocese.

== Episcopacy ==
Brodie was consecrated a bishop on 27 February 1916 in the Cathedral of the Blessed Sacrament, Christchurch by the Apostolic delegate, Cardinal Cerretti, assisted by Archbishop Redwood and Bishop Verdon. His appointment there was received with joy. However, as the first secular bishop in what had been regarded as a Marist diocese, he had lengthy disputes with Marist superiors about the order's tenure of parishes. His relations with individual Marists, however, were at all times courteous.

Brodie was notable for his keen interest and support of Catholic education, especially of St Bede's College, Christchurch. Brodie also supported Nazareth House and the Sisters of the Good Shepherd at Mt Magdala, especially their orphanage of St Joseph. Brodie introduced the Carmelite nuns to Christchurch and he advanced the Holy Name Society, the Legion of Mary and the Catholic Women's League. He also encouraged the establishment of the Grail movement for women. Brodie proved to be a popular, long-serving and hard-working prelate in Christchurch.

== Public concern ==
As Bishop, Brodie always "showed himself in the front rank in any movement connected with the well-being of the community in general". This was especially in the context of the Great Depression. He also supported the Order of St John. Brodie, cooperating with the Anglican Archbishop West-Watson, mediated to promote the settlement of the Tramway Strike of 1932. He met with the parties till dawn in working for a peaceful settlement.

In 1935, he was awarded the King George V Silver Jubilee Medal.

== Death ==
Brodie was a patient at Lewisham Hospital (later called Calvary Hospital) from April 1943 until his death on 11 October 1943, aged 79. His body lay in state on 13 October and thousands of passed through the cathedral. Brodie's requiem mass was celebrated by Bishop Liston and his Panagyric was preached by Archbishop O'Shea. Bishop O'Neill assisted at the Mass. Brodie was interred at Mt Magdala at the St John of God Chapel.

== See also ==
- Catholic Hierarchy website, Bishop Matthew Joseph Brodie (retrieved 21 January 2011).

Catholic Church titles
Preceded by John Grimes	Bishop of Christchurch; 1915–1943	Succeeded by Patrick Lyons
