= Hugh O'Neill (bishop) =

Roman Catholic bishop

The Most Reverend Hugh O'Neill
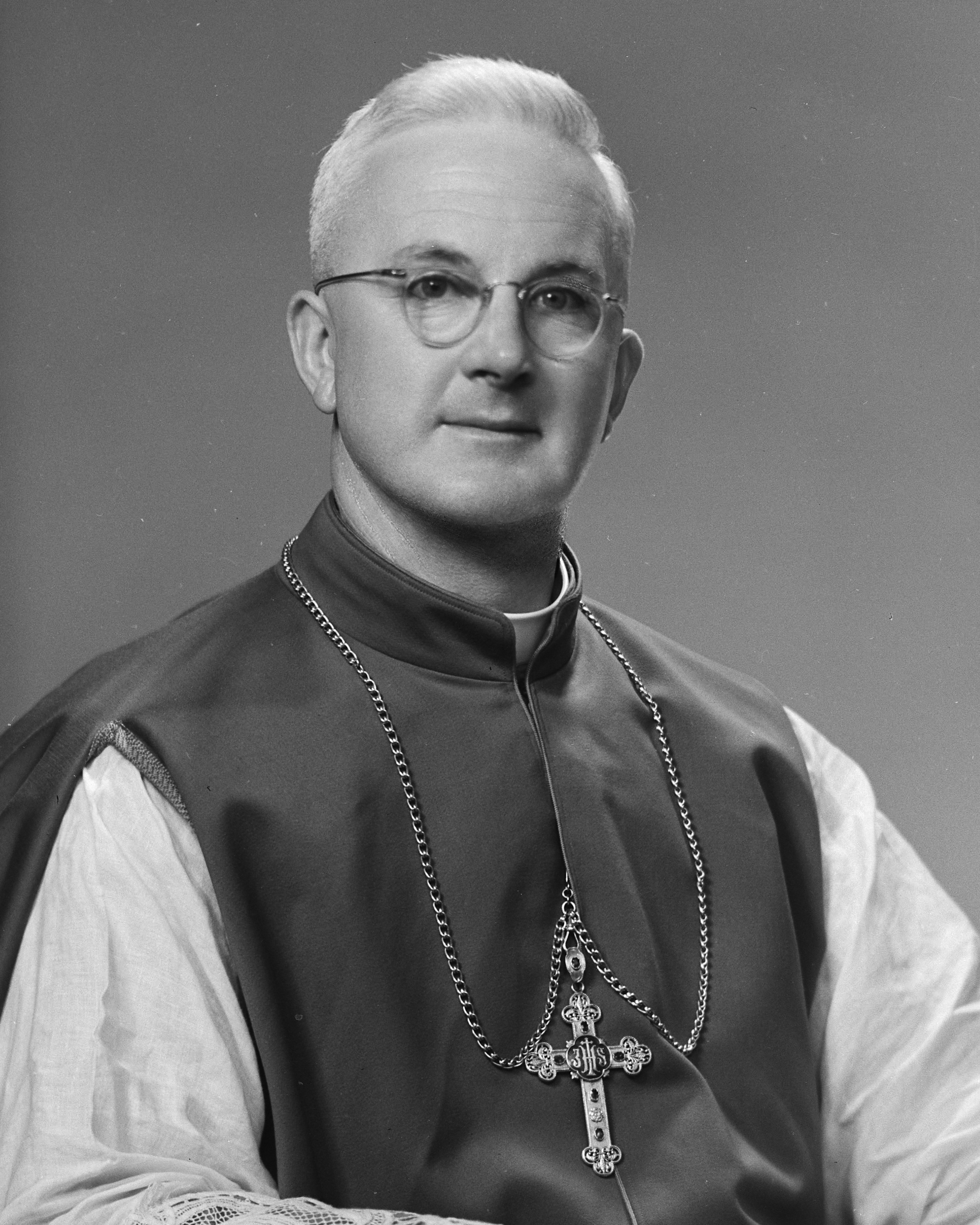
- O'Neill in 1943

Personal details
- Born: Hugh John O'Neill; 29 June 1898 Dunedin, New Zealand
- Died: 27 December 1955 Dunedin, New Zealand

Hugh John O'Neill (29 June 1898 – 27 December 1955) was the Roman Catholic coadjutor Bishop of Dunedin (1943–1949).

== Early life ==
O'Neill was born in Dunedin on 29 June 1898, the son of Edward and Elizabeth O'Neill. The family moved to Mosgiel a few years later. He was educated by the Sisters of Mercy in Mosgiel and at the Christian Brothers School in Dunedin. In 1915 he commenced at Holy Cross seminary and was ordained by Bishop Whyte at St. Joseph's Cathedral, Dunedin on 31 July 1921.

== Career ==
Immediately after ordination, O'Neill was sent to Rome where he studied canon law at the Pontifical Lateran University (the Apollinaris) and resided at the Irish College. He returned to New Zealand in 1923 and was appointed Professor of Canon Law and Scholastic Philosophy at Holy Cross College, Mosgiel. He held that post from 1923 until 1934 when the Vincentian Fathers took over the seminary. In 1934 he became parish priest at Mosgiel. In 1939 he was appointed chaplain at St. Kevin's College, Oamaru. While he held that post he was also Dominion organiser of the Pontifical Missionary Works, the Propagation of the Faith, the Holy Childhood, and the Missionary Union of the Clergy.

== Episcopate ==
Early in 1943, O'Neill received the news of his appointment as Coadjutor Bishop of Dunedin. He was consecrated Titular Bishop of Bareta and Coadjutor Bishop of Dunedin by Archbishop O'Shea of Wellington on 25 March 1943. He resigned the office of coadjutor in 1949 because of ill health. For a time he acted as Vicar-General of the Wellington Archdiocese and in 1950 his health improved sufficiently for him to lead the national pilgrimage to Rome for the Holy Year, but as his health became worse he was forced to relinquish active duties altogether.

== Death ==
He died on 27 December 1955 of a coronary attack at the age of 57 years. His body lay in state at St Joseph's Cathedral until a solemn requiem mass was celebrated on 30 December 1955, attended by all the hierarchy of New Zealand, and a large concourse of clergy and laity

Catholic Church titles
Preceded by -	Coadjutor Bishop of Dunedin; 1943–1949	Succeeded by -
