= Michael Verdon =

19th and 20th-century Catholic Bishop of Dunedin

The Most Reverend Michael Verdon
- 2nd Bishop of Dunedin
- Archdiocese: Archdiocese of Wellington
- Diocese: Roman Catholic Diocese of Dunedin
- Predecessor: Patrick Moran

Orders
- Ordination: 1861? by Archbishop Paul Cullen
- Consecration: 3 May 1896 by Cardinal Patrick Moran

Personal details
- Born: Michael Verdon; 12 December 1838 Liverpool, England
- Died: 23 November 1918 (aged 79) Wellington, New Zealand
- Buried: Dunedin, New Zealand
- Denomination: Roman Catholic Church
- Occupation: Roman Catholic bishop
- Profession: Cleric

Ordination history of Michael Verdon
History
Episcopal consecration
- Principal consecrator: Cardinal Patrick Moran
- Co-consecrators: James Murray; John Grimes

Styles of Michael Verdon
- Reference style: The Most Reverend
- Spoken style: Your Excellency
- Religious style: Bishop

Michael Verdon (19 December 1838 – 23 November 1918) was the 2nd Catholic Bishop of Dunedin from (1896–1918).

== Early life ==
Verdon was born in Liverpool, England on 19 December 1838 His father came from County Louth, Ireland and his mother came from County Kildare. He was a nephew of Cardinal Cullen, Archbishop of Dublin, and a first cousin of Cardinal Moran, Archbishop of Sydney. Verdon received his early education in Castleknock College, Dublin, conducted by the Vincentian Fathers. In 1855 he proceeded to Rome, where he continued his studies in the Irish College. He was ordained priest on 28 December 1861.

== Career ==
In 1861, Verdon was appointed a professor in the ecclesiastical seminary of Dublin, the Holy Cross College, Clonliffe, of which nine years later, he became president. He enlarged the buildings there, constructed a "magnificent church" and considerably improved the quality of the teaching to raise the prestige of the college. In 1879 he was appointed a canon of the Cathedral Chapter, Dublin, by Cardinal MacCabe, Archbishop of Dublin. Verdon then joined the staff of the Irish College in Rome, where as vice-rector he also made improvements and was raised to the dignity of a domestic prelate.

In 1888 he was recruited by Cardinal Moran to go to Sydney to take charge of the newly erected St Patrick's College, Manly. Under his rule, the number of students rose to 65. At the Provincial Council, held in Sydney in 1895, he was elected by the Bishops of Australia to represent them and act as their agent in Rome, and, in February 1896 when he had reached Melbourne on his way there, Verdon received news of his appointment to the see of Dunedin.

== Episcopate ==
Verdon was consecrated bishop in St. Joseph's Cathedral, Dunedin, on Sunday, 3 May 1896, by Cardinal Moran, assisted by Archbishop Redwood of Wellington, Bishop Murray of Maitland and Bishop Grimes of Christchurch. It was the first time that a bishop was consecrated in New Zealand. One of Verdon's first concerns was the establishment of a national seminary in Dunedin and, with the support of the other New Zealand bishops, Holy Cross College, Mosgiel was opened on 3 May 1900, exactly four years after Verdon's consecration and Verdon was himself its first rector.

It was a significant step forward for the Church in New Zealand ensuring an adequate supply of clergy trained in New Zealand and also creating "a very real bond between the secular priests of the country". On 12 December 1909 Verdon ordained the first six priests from the seminary. In 1911 he celebrated his golden jubilee of the priesthood. During the 22 years of his tenure, Verdon generally went about his work quietly. He took no part in public affairs but confined himself to church matters. He encouraged new schools established by the Dominican sisters. He introduced the Sisters of Mercy in South Dunedin, where they established the St Vincent de Paul Orphanage and St Philomena's College. Later they set up many other primary schools in the Dunedin diocese. Verdon also invited the Little Sisters of the Poor to Dunedin to care for the aged poor.

== Death ==
In 1918, in the midst of the influenza epidemic, Verdon went to Rotorua for health reasons and improved greatly there. However, on the return journey he caught a cold which developed into Bronchitis. He died at St Gerard's Redemptorist Monastery, Wellington on 23 November 1918, aged 79. His remains were brought to Dunedin. Bishop Brodie of Christchurch (who had been a student of Verdon's 28 years before at St Patrick's College, Manly) celebrated the Requiem Mass and preached the panegyric.

== Interment ==
Verdon was interred in the Southern Cemetery alongside his predecessor Bishop Moran in the mausoleum erected for the first bishop of Dunedin. There his body remained until 1963, when it was transferred to the chapel built in his memory at Holy Cross College, Mosgiel.

== Character and influence ==
In an editorial The Otago Daily Times compared Verdon with his predecessor Patrick Moran. Moran was physically slight but vibrant with "mental activity, nervous energy and fiery eloquence". Verdon was a large man with a massive frame, but he shunned publicity and was not widely known outside the Catholic community. Verdon's delight was in building new churches, expanding Catholic education and in philanthropy. He had "simple tastes, a singularly winning manner, deep sympathies, and profound wisdom".

Verdon's uncle and mentor, Cardinal Cullen had insisted on complete loyalty to Rome, the pope and the magisterium. He encouraged his priests to wear Roman clerical garb and to decorate their churches "in the fashion of contemporaneous Roman basilicas". This attitude was inherited by Verdon. He had great reverence for the Italian Catholic Reformation Sants, Philip Neri and Charles Borromeo. He also preferred to send talented seminarians to Rome for further training and he decorated Holy Cross College in a very Roman way. These attitudes were also transferred to those whom Verdon mentored, including James Liston, the seventh Bishop of Auckland.

Catholic Church titles
Preceded by Patrick Moran	2nd Bishop of Dunedin; 1896–1918	Succeeded by James Whyte
