= Raffaello Squarise =

Italian musician (1856–1945)

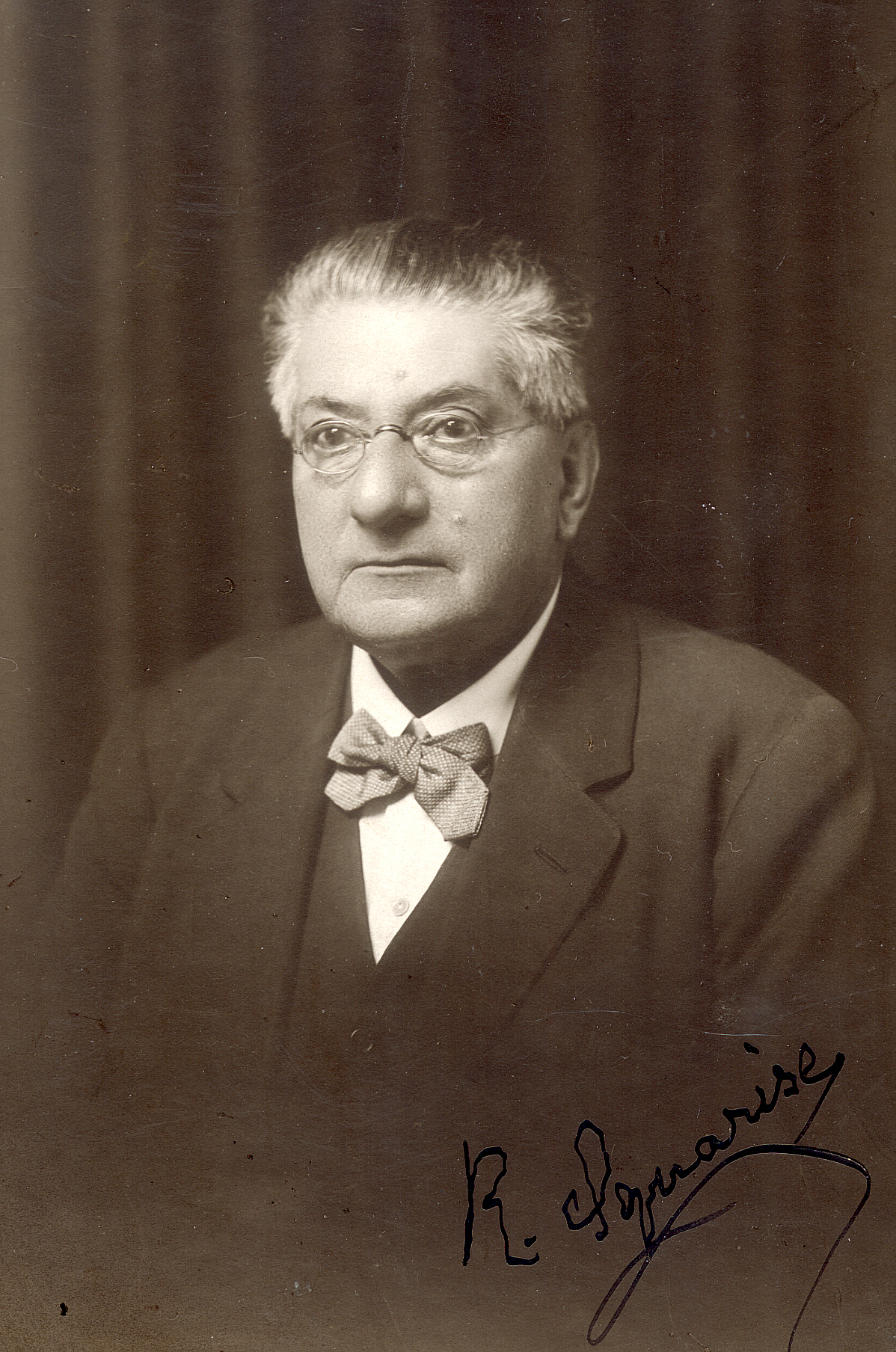
- Raffaello Squarise

Background information
- Born: 13 November 1856; Vicenza, Austrian Empire (present-day Italy)
- Died: 15 April 1945 (aged 88) Roxburgh, New Zealand
- Genres: Classical music
- Occupation: Conductor
- Instrument: Violin
- Spouse: Camille Chapuis Villanis (m. 1887; died 1941)

Raffaello Squarise (13 November 1856—15 April 1945), also known as Raphael Squarise, was an Italian violinist, teacher, conductor, and composer, who settled in Adelaide, South Australia, and Dunedin, New Zealand. He was a pioneer in the establishment of classical music in New Zealand.

== Biography ==
=== Early years in Italy ===
Raffaello Squarise was born in Vicenza, then part of the Austrian Empire, where his father, Antonio Squarise, worked as a sculptor. He attended the Istituto Musicale, Turin, for six years, studying violin under Francesco Bianchi and Pietro Bertuzzi, and composition under Carlo Pedrotti. Around this time he played in the orchestra of the Teatro Regio. Squarise graduated in 1875, completing a miniature Symphony in C Minor for his final examination. On returning to Vicenza he completed further study under Francesco Canneti. He afterwards served as military bandmaster at Contarina and municipal bandmaster at Arzignano.

=== Australian years ===
Squarise left Italy for Australia in 1882, arriving in Melbourne in August that year. He spent much of the next year as a violinist in the touring opera orchestras of the Williamson, Garner and Musgrove Company, and the Cagli and Paoli Opera Company. He arrived in Adelaide in July 1883 with Heywood's Minstrel Troupe and decided to settle in the city. He established a performing and teaching partnership with fellow Italian Faustino Ziliani and featured in many local concerts.

Squarise established 'Squarise's Band' and this led to the formation of the South Australian Militia Band in 1886, with Squarise appointed Lieutenant Bandmaster. The band enjoyed the patronage of Governor William Robinson, and Squarise's violin pupils included Robinson's daughter. Squarise was associated with the Adelaide String Quartet Club, St. Francis Xavier's Cathedral, and various local music societies. His compositions during this period included a polka for the opening of the Adelaide Arcade, a funeral march in memory of Wilhelm I of Germany, and battle fantasia The Battle of Sedan. A proposed opera, The Magic Dice, did not come to fruition.

In 1887 Squarise married Camille Villanis (née Chapuis), the Swiss widow of an Italian vigneron, at the residence of Adolph Marvale in Norwood.

=== New Zealand years ===
Squarise arrived in Dunedin, New Zealand, in September 1889 to take up the position of leader of the orchestra of the New Zealand and South Seas Exhibition. He featured as a soloist and his Symphony in C Minor was performed on several occasions. He was also one of the judges at the exhibition's brass band contest.

The exhibition concluded in May 1890 and Squarise decided to settle in Dunedin. That year he established the Otago Conservatorio of Music in association with the German pianist Arthur Barmeyer. During the next several years Squarise also organised chamber concerts, served as conductor of the Dunedin Engineers' Band and Dunedin Garrison Band, and established the Dunedin Citizens' Band. He was conductor of the Dunedin Liedertafel and briefly choirmaster at St. Joseph's Cathedral.

Some of Squarise's piano compositions were published during the 1890s and in 1894 he composed a comic opera, Fabian, to a libretto by Donald Cargill. Fabian's ten-night season was a critical and popular success, but Squarise did not compose any further operas.

In 1904 Squarise formed the Dunedin Philharmonic Society, an amateur orchestra of fifty to seventy players. The string players were all his own pupils. The society performed the New Zealand premieres of many orchestral works, including Tchaikovsky's Symphony Pathetique (1905). It frequently featured Squarise's own compositions, including his Symphony in C Minor, numerous marches, and the patriotic battle fantasia Military Caprice (1914). Squarise continued to conduct the orchestra until it was disbanded in 1933.

In 1905 Squarise was elected President of the Otago Society of Musicians, a position he held for eight years.

Squarise retired from public life in July 1933, at the age of 76. The complimentary concert held to mark the occasion was also the final concert of the Dunedin Philharmonic Society. Squarise's wife Camille died in 1941, and Squarise eventually moved to Roxburgh, Central Otago, to live with friends. He died there on 15 April 1945.

== Key works ==
- Symphony in C minor (1875)
- La Fanfara Militara (1876)
- L'Addio, for violin and piano (c.1884)
- La Revolte aux Enfers (1887)
- Todtenmarsch in memory of Kaiser Wilhelm I (1888)
- Mass St Joseph (1890, 1914)
- Fabian, comic opera (1894)
- Grand Funeral March in memory of Richard Seddon (1906)
- Call to the Fight, march (1908)
- Grand Overture to Rossini's Stabat Mater (1913)
- Onward Otago, march (1914)
- Military Caprice (1914)
