= Roman Catholic Diocese of Dunedin =

Roman Catholic diocese in New Zealand

Coordinates: 45.87444°S 170.497942°E

Diocese of Dunedin Dioecesis Dunedinensis

Location
- Country: New Zealand
- Territory: New Zealand
- Ecclesiastical province: Wellington

Statistics
- Area: 64,747 km^{2} (24,999 sq mi)
- Population: Total; Catholics: (as of 2022); 306,120; 34,000 (11.1%)
- Parishes: 28

Information
- Denomination: Catholic Church
- Sui iuris church: Latin Church
- Rite: Roman Rite
- Established: 26 November 1869
- Cathedral: St. Joseph's Cathedral

Current leadership
- Pope: Leo XIV
- Bishop: Michael Dooley

St. Joseph's Cathedral, Dunedin

The Latin Rite Roman Catholic Diocese of Dunedin (Dioecesis Dunedinensis) is a suffragan diocese of the Roman Catholic Archdiocese of Wellington. Its cathedral and see city are located in Dunedin, the second-largest city in the South Island of New Zealand. It was formed on 26 November 1869 from a portion of the territory in the Diocese of Wellington, before it was elevated to an archdiocese.

== Bishops of Dunedin ==
Tenure	Incumbent	Life
1869–1895	Patrick Moran	(1823–1895)
1896–1918	Michael Verdon	(1838–1918)
1920–1957	James Whyte	(1868–1957)
1957–1985	John Patrick Kavanagh	(1913–1985)
1985–2004	Leonard Anthony Boyle	(1930–2016)
2004–2018	Colin David Campbell	(b. 1941)
2018–present	Michael Dooley	(b. 1961)

== Current bishops ==
- Michael Dooley, seventh Bishop of Dunedin
- Colin David Campbell, Bishop Emeritus of Dunedin.

== Other bishops ==
=== Coadjutor bishops ===
- Hugh John O'Neill (1943–1949), did not succeed to see
- Leonard Anthony Boyle (1983–1985)

=== Auxiliary bishop ===
- John Patrick Kavanagh (1949–1957), appointed Bishop here

=== Other priest of this diocese who became bishop ===
- James Michael Liston, appointed Coadjutor Bishop of Auckland in 1920

== Cathedral ==
- St. Joseph's Cathedral, Dunedin

== Secondary schools ==
- Trinity Catholic College, Dunedin
- St Kevin's College, Oamaru
- St Peter's College, Gore
- Verdon College, Invercargill

== See also ==
- Holy Cross Seminary
- Holy Name Seminary
- St. Mary's Basilica, Invercargill
- Roman Catholicism in New Zealand
- List of New Zealand Catholic bishops

== External links and references ==
- Catholic Diocese of Dunedin
- "Diocese of Dunedin". Catholic-Hierarchy.
