= Te Tomairangi Marae =

Marae in Invercargill, New Zealand

Coordinates: 46°24′59.78″S 168°21′6.87″E

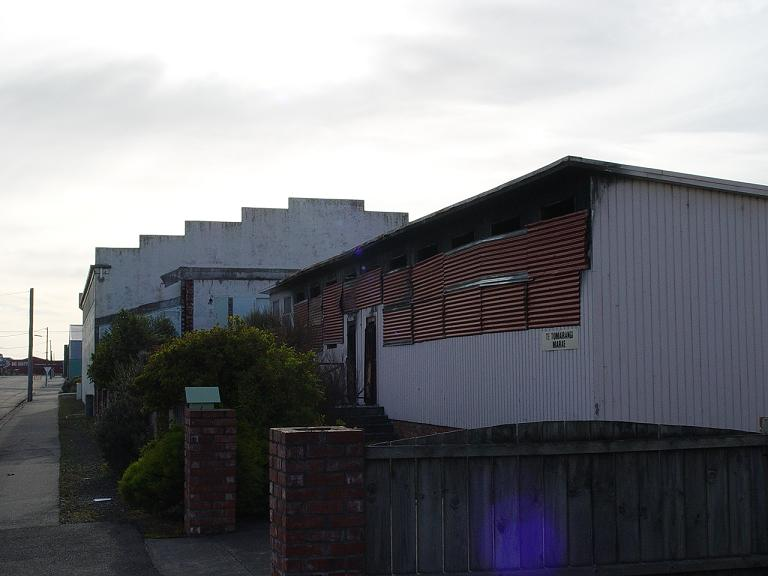

Te Tomairangi Marae is an Invercargill Marae on the same city block as St Josephs School and St. Mary's Basilica. In late 2005, the Marae was affected by vandals who set fire to the main building. Months previously a Warehouse within a few hundred metres was also burnt. The fire consumed much of the marae. As of March 2005 the marae is currently boarded up. After being destroyed by fire twice the building reopened in 2008 with a sprinkler system installed.
