= Leonard Boyle (bishop) =

Roman Catholic bishop

The Most Reverend Leonard Boyle
- Bishop of Dunedin
- Church: Catholic Church
- Diocese: Diocese of Dunedin
- In office: 10 July 1985 – 24 May 2004
- Predecessor: John Kavanagh
- Successor: Colin Campbell
- Previous post: Coadjutor Bishop of Dunedin (1983-1985)

Orders
- Ordination: 29 June 1961 by John Kavanagh
- Consecration: 3 May 1983 by John Kavanagh

Personal details
- Born: 30 November 1930 Nightcaps, Wallace County, New Zealand, British Empire
- Died: 1 June 2016 (aged 85) Dunedin, Otago, New Zealand

Leonard Anthony Boyle (30 November 1930 – 1 June 2016) was a New Zealand bishop. He was the fifth Catholic Bishop of Dunedin from 1985 to 2005.

== Early life and education ==
Boyle was born in Nightcaps, Southland, New Zealand, on 30 November 1930 and was educated at Sisters of Mercy convent schools in Nightcaps and Winton. He received his secondary education at St Kevin's College, Oamaru, before training for ordination at Holy Name Seminary in Christchurch and Holy Cross College in Mosgiel.

== Priesthood ==
He was ordained as a priest in Winton on 30 June 1961. He held appointments as curate at St Patrick's Basilica, South Dunedin (1961–1964) (where he encouraged the novena devotions) and Georgetown, Invercargill (1964–1970). He was parish priest in South Dunedin (1970–1972) and at St. Mary's Basilica, Invercargill (1972–1983).

== Episcopacy ==
He was appointed coadjutor bishop for the Dunedin diocese on 27 January 1983 and was ordained as a bishop at Dunedin's town hall on 3 May 1983. He succeeded to the see on the death of his predecessor, John Kavanagh, on 10 July 1985. Boyle retired on 24 May 2004. He was succeeded by Colin Campbell.

Catholic Church titles
| Preceded by - | Coadjutor Bishop of Dunedin; 1983–1985 | Succeeded by - |
| Preceded by John Kavanagh | 5th Bishop of Dunedin; 1985–2004 | Succeeded by Colin David Campbell |
