= John Kavanagh (bishop) =

Catholic bishop

John Patrick Kavanagh
- Bishop of Dunedin
- Church: Catholic Church
- Diocese: Diocese of Dunedin
- In office: 26 December 1957 – 10 July 1985
- Predecessor: James Whyte
- Successor: Leonard Boyle
- Previous posts: Titular Bishop of Algiza (1949-1957); Coadjutor Bishop of Dunedin (1949-1957)

Orders
- Ordination: 6 September 1936 by Thomas O'Shea
- Consecration: 30 November 1949 by Peter McKeefry

Personal details
- Born: 30 April 1913 Hāwera, Patea County, Dominion of New Zealand, British Empire
- Died: 10 July 1985 (aged 72) Dunedin, Otago, New Zealand

John Patrick Kavanagh (30 April 1913 – 10 July 1985) was the fourth Catholic Bishop of Dunedin (1957–1985).

== Biography ==
Kavanagh was born in Hāwera in 1913; he was the eldest of ten children in a farming family.

He trained for the priesthood at Holy Cross College, Mosgiel and was ordained on 6 September 1936 at St Mary of the Angels Church, Wellington; a few days later he travelled to Rome to continue his studies and he went on to complete a doctorate in law. He returned to New Zealand in 1940, working at Lower Hutt and Wellington, as well as being an army chaplain during WWII. In 1944 he was placed in charge of looking after 700 Polish refugee children at Lyall Bay and Island Bay. He was involved in education and funding for schools.

He became a bishop on 30th November 1949 and was ordained Bishop of Dunedin on 26th December 1957.

In 1953, Kavanagh was awarded the Queen Elizabeth II Coronation Medal.

Kavanagh died in Dunedin on 10 July 1985.

== Legacy ==
Dunedin's only Catholic secondary school, Kavanagh College, was named after him until 2023.

In 2018 public controversy arose as to his handling of clergy and religious abuse allegations during his episcopal tenure. In 2020, Cardinal John Dew instigated an investigation into Kavanagh's actions. The investigation found that Kavanagh failed to investigate abuse claims relating to one priest. In 2022 it was announced that Kavanagh College would be renamed Trinity Catholic College from 1 January 2023 in consequence.

Catholic Church titles
| Preceded by - | Auxiliary Bishop of Dunedin; 1949–1957 | Succeeded by - |
| Preceded by James Whyte | 4th Bishop of Dunedin; 1957–1985 | Succeeded by Leonard Boyle |
