= Patrick Moran (bishop) =

Bishop of Dunedin New Zealand

Patrick Moran (24 May 1823 – 22 May 1895) was Vicar Apostolic of Eastern Province of Cape Colony in South Africa (1856–1869) and the first Roman Catholic Bishop of Dunedin, New Zealand (1869–1895).

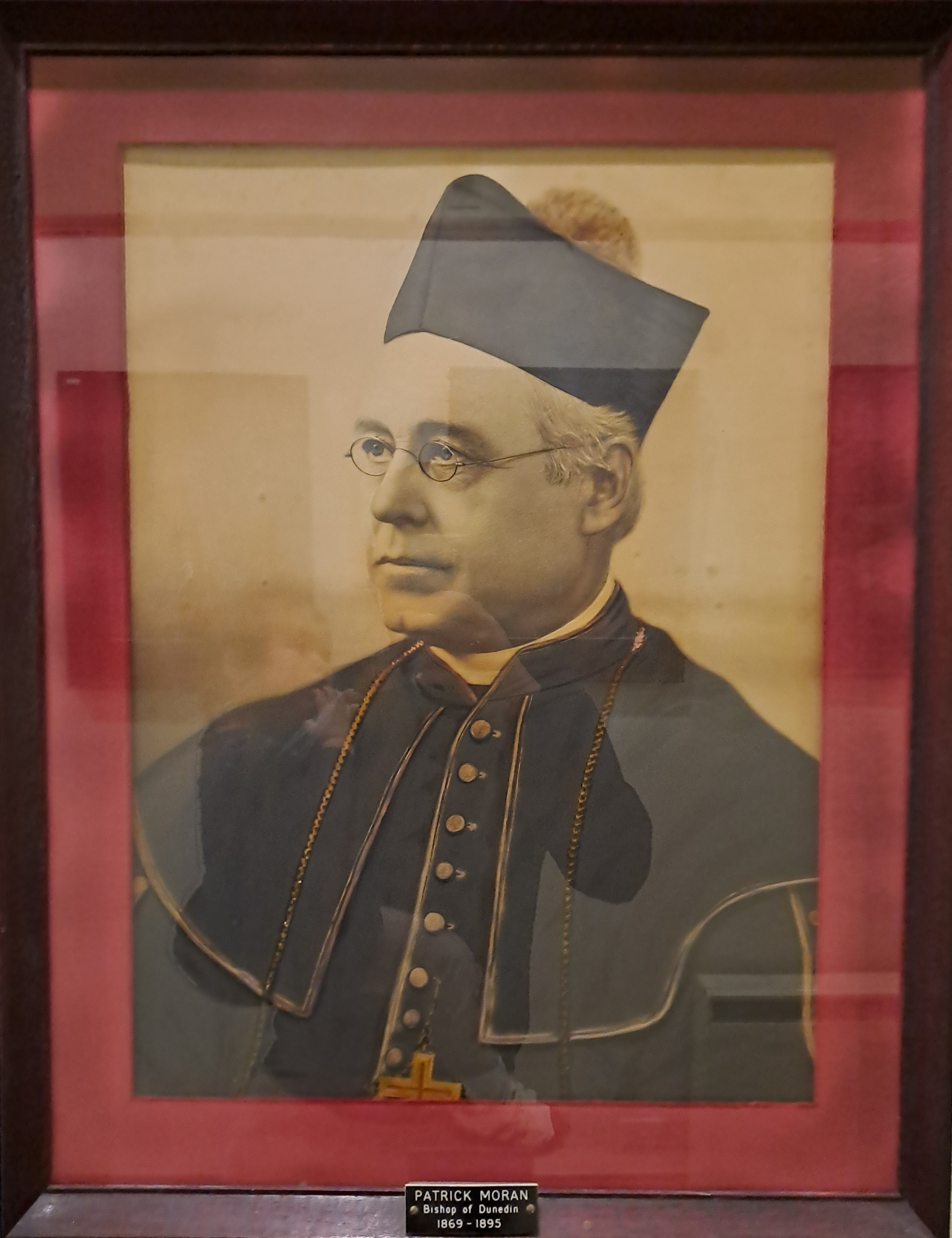
Official portrait of Patrick Moran, first Roman Catholic Bishop of Dunedin, New Zealand.

== Death ==
Moran died in Dunedin on 22 May 1895.

== Sources ==
- Michael King, God's Farthest Outpost: A History of Catholics in New Zealand, Penguin Books, Auckland, 1997
- E.R. Simmons, A Brief History of the Catholic Church in New Zealand, Catholic Publication Centre, Auckland, 1978.
- E.R. Simmons, In Cruce Salus, A History of the Diocese of Auckland 1848 – 1980, Catholic Publication Centre, Auckland 1982.
- Sweetman, Rory. "Cleary, Henry William 1859 – 1929". Dictionary of New Zealand Biography. Ministry for Culture and Heritage.
- Catholic Hierarchy website Bishop Patrick Moran (retrieved 28 January 2011).

Catholic Church titles
Preceded by Aidan Devereaux	Vicar Apostolic of Cape of Good Hope, Eastern District {Capo de Buona Speranza, Distretto Orientale}, South Africa; 1856–1869	Succeeded by James David Ricards
Preceded by New title	1st Bishop of Dunedin; 1869–1895	Succeeded by Michael Verdon
