= St Joseph's Cathedral, Dunedin =

Catholic cathedral in Dunedin, New Zealand

St Joseph's Cathedral
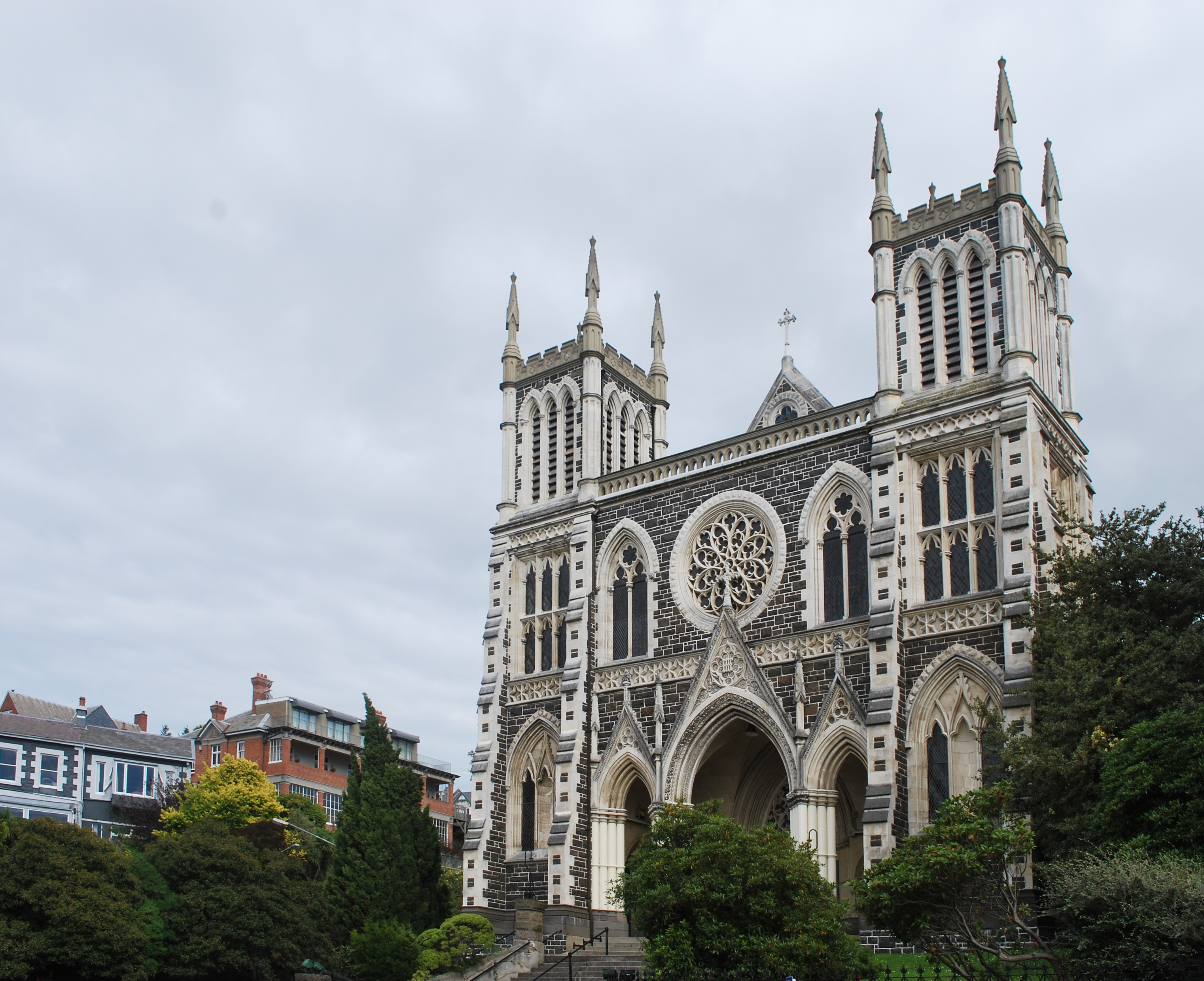
- St Joseph's Cathedral as it appeared in 2011
- St Joseph's Cathedral
- 45°52′28″S 170°29′53″E
- Location: City Rise, Dunedin
- Address: 288 Rattray Street, Dunedin
- Country: New Zealand
- Denomination: Roman Catholic
- Website: Official Website

Architecture
- Functional status: Open
- Designated: 14 February 1886
- Architect: Francis Petre
- Architectural type: Cathedral
- Style: Gothic Revival

Administration
- Archdiocese: Wellington
- Diocese: Dunedin

Clergy
- Bishop: Michael Dooley
- Priest: Rev Fr Vaughan Leslie

Heritage New Zealand – Category 1
- Designated: 11 November 1982
- Reference no.: 364

St Joseph's Cathedral is the cathedral for the Roman Catholic Diocese of Dunedin (Dioecesis Dunedinensis). It is located in City Rise in the city of Dunedin, New Zealand. It serves as the seat of the bishop of the Latin Church Diocese of Dunedin, which was opened on 26 November 1886.

== History ==
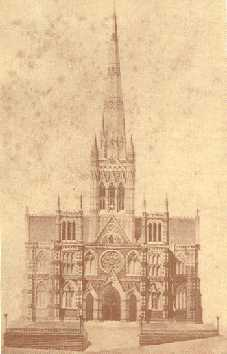
St Joseph's Cathedral as Petre intended it. This design was never completed.

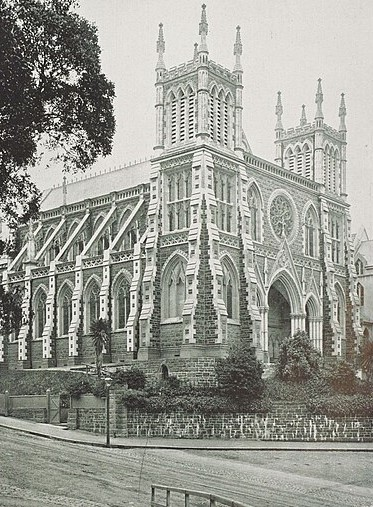
St Joseph's Cathedral (August 1912)

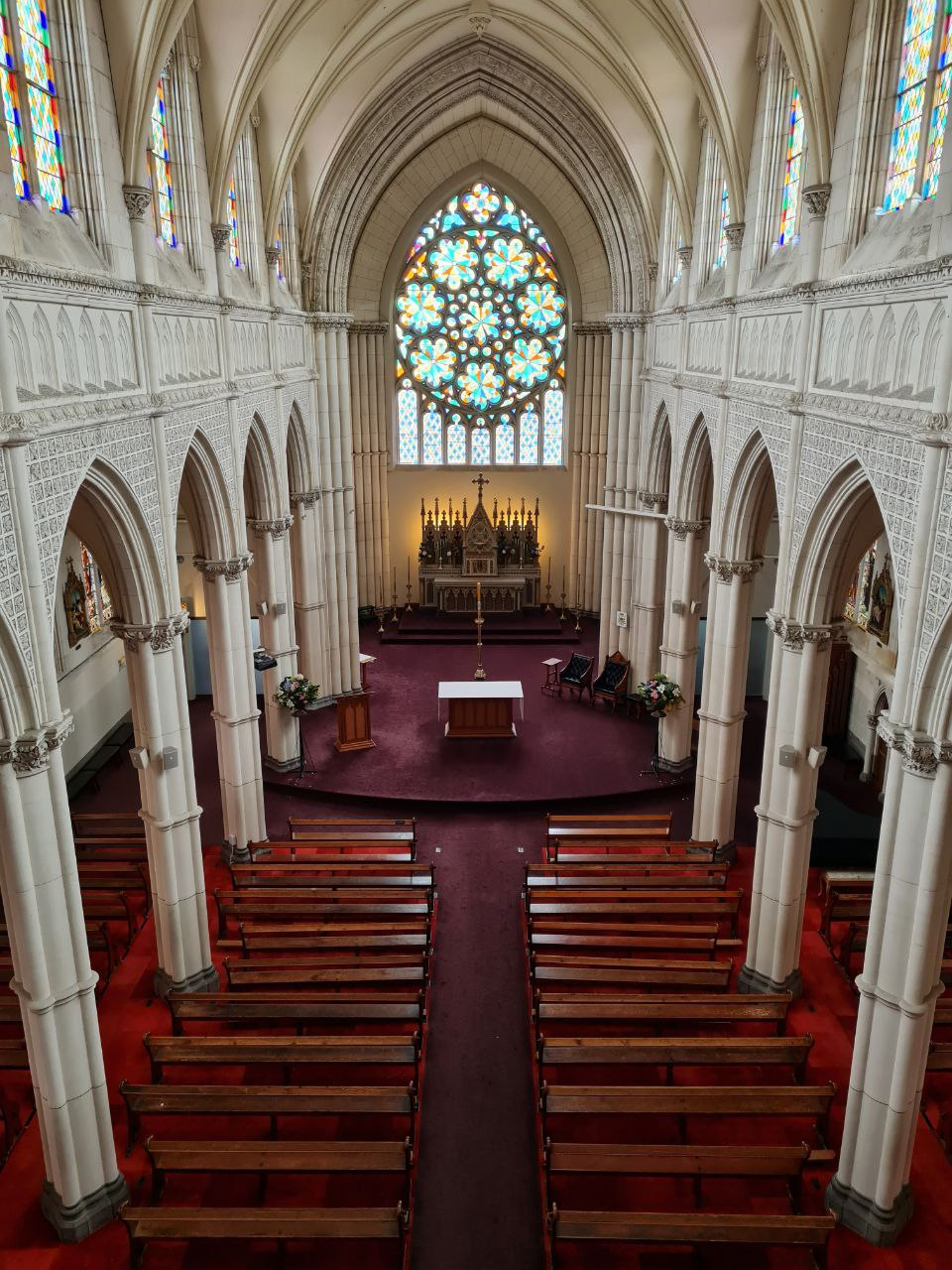
Interior view of the nave and sanctuary of the cathedral (April 2023)

The Gothic Revival cathedral was designed by Francis Petre, who also later, in a complete change of style to Palladian revival, designed St Patrick's Basilica, Oamaru (1894), Sacred Heart Cathedral, Wellington (1901), the Cathedral of the Blessed Sacrament, Christchurch (1905) (renaissance-revival), St. Mary's Basilica, Invercargill (1905), St Patrick's Basilica, Waimate (1909) and Sacred Heart Basilica, Timaru (1911).

The first St Joseph's Church (the current cathedral's predecessor) was built in 1862 and was located to the north of the cathedral's site. It was a simple brick structure and the city's first Roman Catholic church.

=== Construction ===
In September 1868, one acre of land was purchased by the Diocese from The Crown for £59, with the title being transferred into the name of Bishop Moran in 1871.

The construction of the cathedral started off with difficulties, having to contend with a gully and underground streams. Fr Delphin Moreau SM unsuccessfully negotiated with the City Council for them to assist with the filling of the gully, however, Bishop Patrick Moran was able to secure excavated material from the construction of Dowling Street to fill the gully.

Construction of the cathedral's foundations started in May 1878. Owing to the infilled gully, forty piles ranging in size from 4–8 feet (1.2–2.4 m) squared were sunk 30–40 feet (9.1–12.2 m) onto a bluestone reef. These piles were then connected by concrete arches to give the cathedral a level surface on which to build on. Despite the rigid foundations, the front of the cathedral started to suffer subsidence after fifteen years of being built.

On 26 January 1879, Bishop Moran laid and blessed the foundation stone. It was used for its first church service on 14 February 1886, and was completed in its unfinished state in May 1886, at a cost of £22,500. The original design, however, was for a much larger building, with a tall spire with a height of 200 feet (61 m) over the transept.

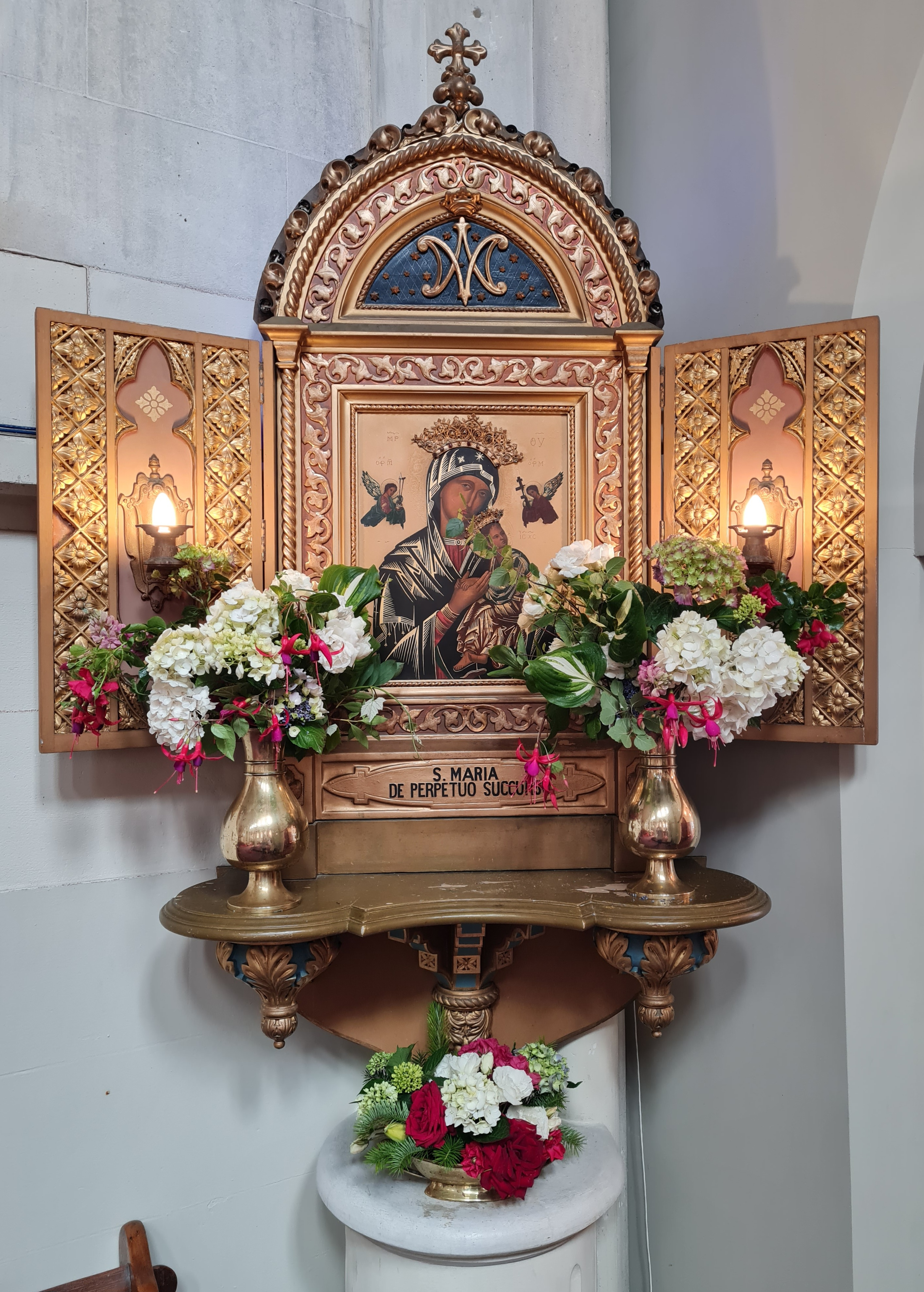
Our Lady of Perpetual Succour Shrine (December 2023)

A description of St Joseph's Cathedral from a letter of the reporter of the Auckland Evening Star in 1889 says, "The cable tram has carried you up barely two hundred feet when you see a double-towered church of dark grey stone standing on a site cut into the hill. This is the Catholic Cathedral, St Joseph — and it is a gem. The outside gives you no idea of the beauty within." This is a poor description of what was built. While it falls short of the original conception the building as it stands gives a better idea of the outstanding structure which was never completed.

=== Renovations ===
The cathedral has undergone several internal modifications, the most notable being the removal of the high altar after Vatican II; it was returned after a long sojourn in the Dunedin Public Art Gallery. The 1896 Memorial Altar to Bishop Moran designed by Petre was dismantled in early 1970, and has since been made into a large tabernacle, kept in the Blessed Sacrament Chapel (former Nuns' Chancel) beside the sanctuary. Other parts of the façade of this altar have been kept and are currently in storage. A reconciliation room was added to replace the old confessionals in the nave of the cathedral.

In the 1950s, the Oamaru stone pinnacles on the two towers had to be removed due to their deteriorating condition. It was not until 1974 that precast concrete replicas of the 12 feet (3.7 m) pinnacles were made and put back into position by Downer and Co. This work was completed by August 1975.

==== Reinstatement of cultural heritage ====
In March 2023, the confessionals were renovated and returned to their original use. The shrine of Our Lady of Perpetual Succour was also reinstated.

On 19 November 2023, the Blessed Sacrament was returned to the tabernacle of the high altar (where it was housed in the Blessed Sacrament Chapel) by Fr Vaughan Leslie. Originally, Bishop Dooley, along with Novatus Rugambwa, Apostolic Nuncio to New Zealand were also planning to be present at the Solemn Mass. However, due to other commitments and ill health, respectively, they were not in attendance.

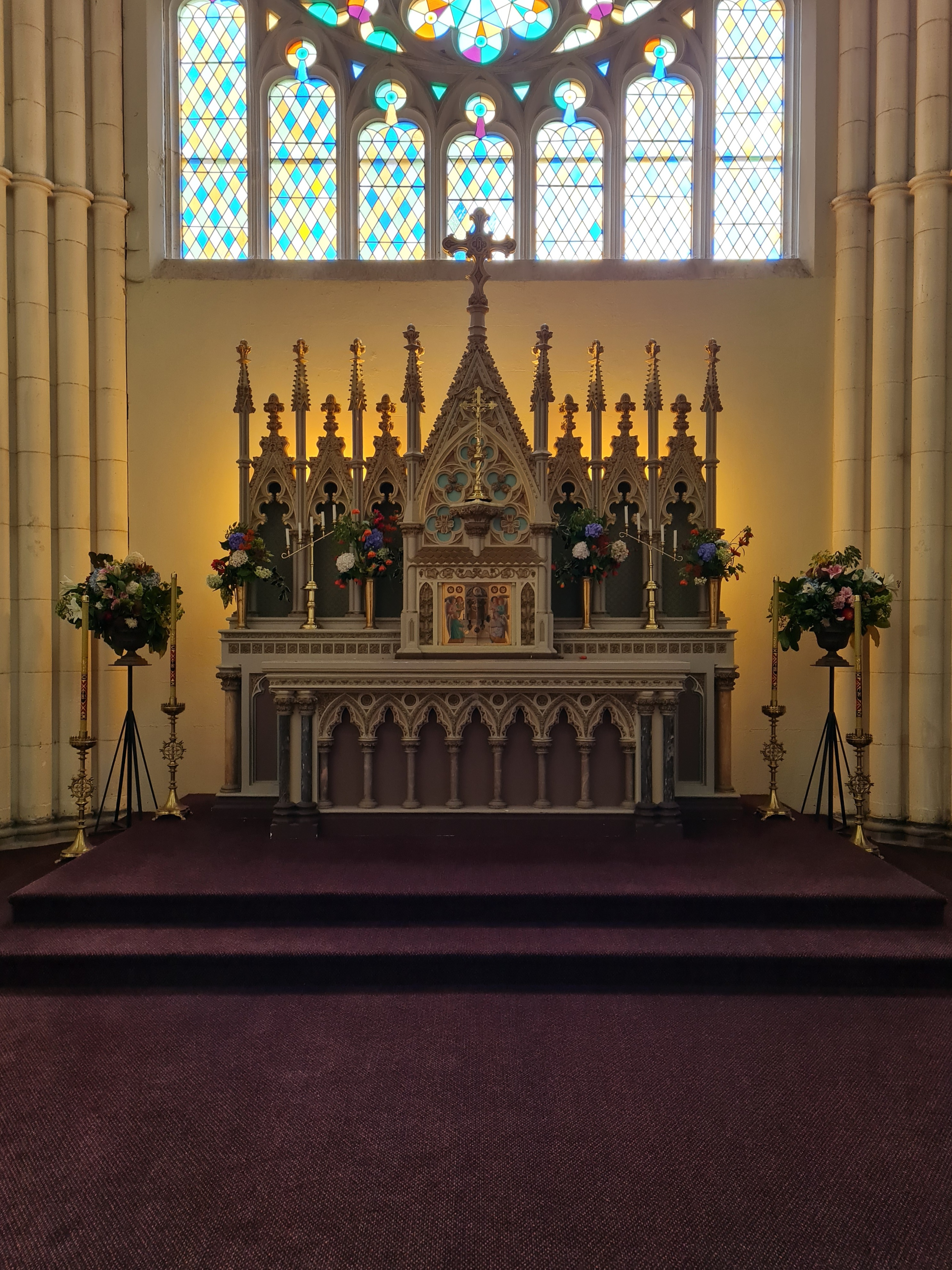
The High Altar (April 2023)

The cathedral angels (originally crafted by the Mattei Bros., Melbourne) that used to stand either side of the high altar were restored by The Studio of Saint Philomena, and both placed back to their original positions. Their wings and the candelabra which the angels once held have had to be remade. The wings, having not properly dried in time for the Solemn Mass were reunited with the angels on Gaudate Sunday (17 December 2023).

It is planned for new altar rails and the original altar rail gates, the wooden baldachin, and the entrance crucifix to be returned to the Sanctuary.

== Architectural features ==
=== Baptismal font ===
The baptismal font, as old as the cathedral, is made of Oamaru limestone, with the bowl of the font lined with quartz pebbles from Moeraki Beach. This is the beach that Bishop Pompallier landed during his first visit to the south in November 1840, where he then conducted his first Baptisms for the region. The font was designed by Petre and ornamentations carved by Louis John Godfrey.

=== Stations of the Cross ===
The 14 Stations, designed in the Gothic style, were supplied by Mayer and Co., Munich, and were erected in the cathedral in October 1890.

== Organs and Choir ==
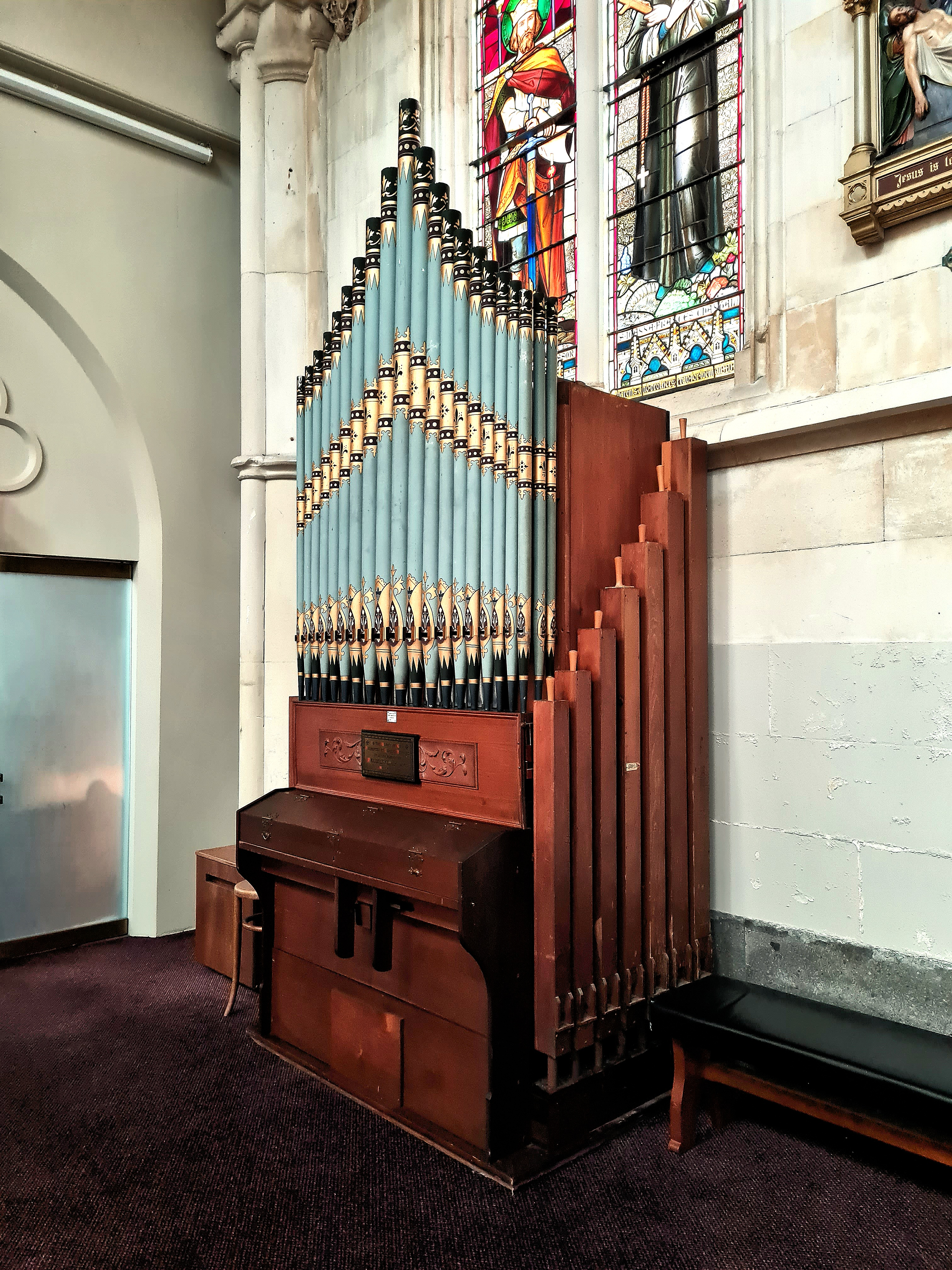
The Cathedral's second organ, the Casson's Patent Opus 226, built by the Positive Organ Company Ltd., London, England. (April 2023)

=== Organs ===
The main organ was purchased by Fr Delphin Moreau SM in 1866 for the first St Joseph's Church and built by George Fincham and Sons of Melbourne. Once the organ was shipped to Dunedin it was erected by Charles Begg and opened on 1 February 1867. After the new cathedral had been built, it was transferred in early 1886 before the opening ceremony in February of that year. Edward Henry Jenkins (of Christchurch) was made responsible for the rebuilding of the organ in the new cathedral.

After a rebuild was undertaken by the South Island Organ Company, Timaru (which included making use of the original Fincham pipework with a new layout and Positive division), the organ was dedicated on 1 June 1976. Upon the completion of the rebuild, two wooden statues were presented as gifts of the Cathedral Choir. The statues now sit on either side of the Positive division casework. The three manuals of the organ are: Swell, Great and Positive.

A second organ was obtained in early 2023, where it was installed and first used at the Mass of the Veneration of the Cross, on Good Friday, 2023. It has one manual and is a Casson's Patent, Opus 226, made by the Positive Organ Company Limited, London. The organ was originally housed in Holy Trinity Anglican Church, Lawrence, before finding itself in the collection of the New Zealand Organ Museum in Herbert. The plaque on the organ reads: "+ TO THE GLORY OF GOD + PRESENTED BY EDWARD HERBERT, IN LOVING MEMORY OF MAGDELENE, HIS WIFE. 15TH NOVEMBER 1897".

Stops contained on the 1866 George Fincham Organ (with 1976 additions included)
Great	Swell	Positive	Pedal	Couplers
Quintaten 16, Open Diapason 8, Claribel Flute 8, Quintaten 8, Dulciana 8, Principal 4, Flute 4, Twelfth 2 2/3, Fifteenth 2, Mixture (19-22-26-29) IV	Open Diapason 8, Stopped Diapason 8, Salicional 8, Celeste T.C. 8, Principal 4, Fifteenth 2, Mixture (22-26-29) III, Trumpet 8, Oboe 8, Tremulant	Rohr Flute 8, Koppel Flute 4, Gemshom 2, Larigot 1 1/3, Sesquialtra (12-17)	Open Diapason 16, Bourdon 16, Quintaten 16, Trombone 16, Quint 10 2/3, Principal 8, Bass Flute 8, Quintaten 8, Quint 5 1/3, Octave 4, Quintaten 4	Swell to Great, Swell Octave to Great, Swell Sub Octave to Great, Positive to Great, Positive Octave to Great, Swell to Positive, Swell Octave to Positive, Great to Pedal, Swell to Pedal, Swell Octave to Pedal, Positive to Pedal, Swell Octave, Swell Sub Octave

Stops contained on the Casson Positive Organ
Manual I	Features
Double Bass 16, Bourdon 16, Melodic Viol 8, Voix Celestes 8, Salicional 8, Gedeckt Bass 8, Gedeckt Treble 8, Dulcet Bass 4, Dulcet Treble 4	Transposer, 'Moveable' keyboard

=== Cathedral choir ===
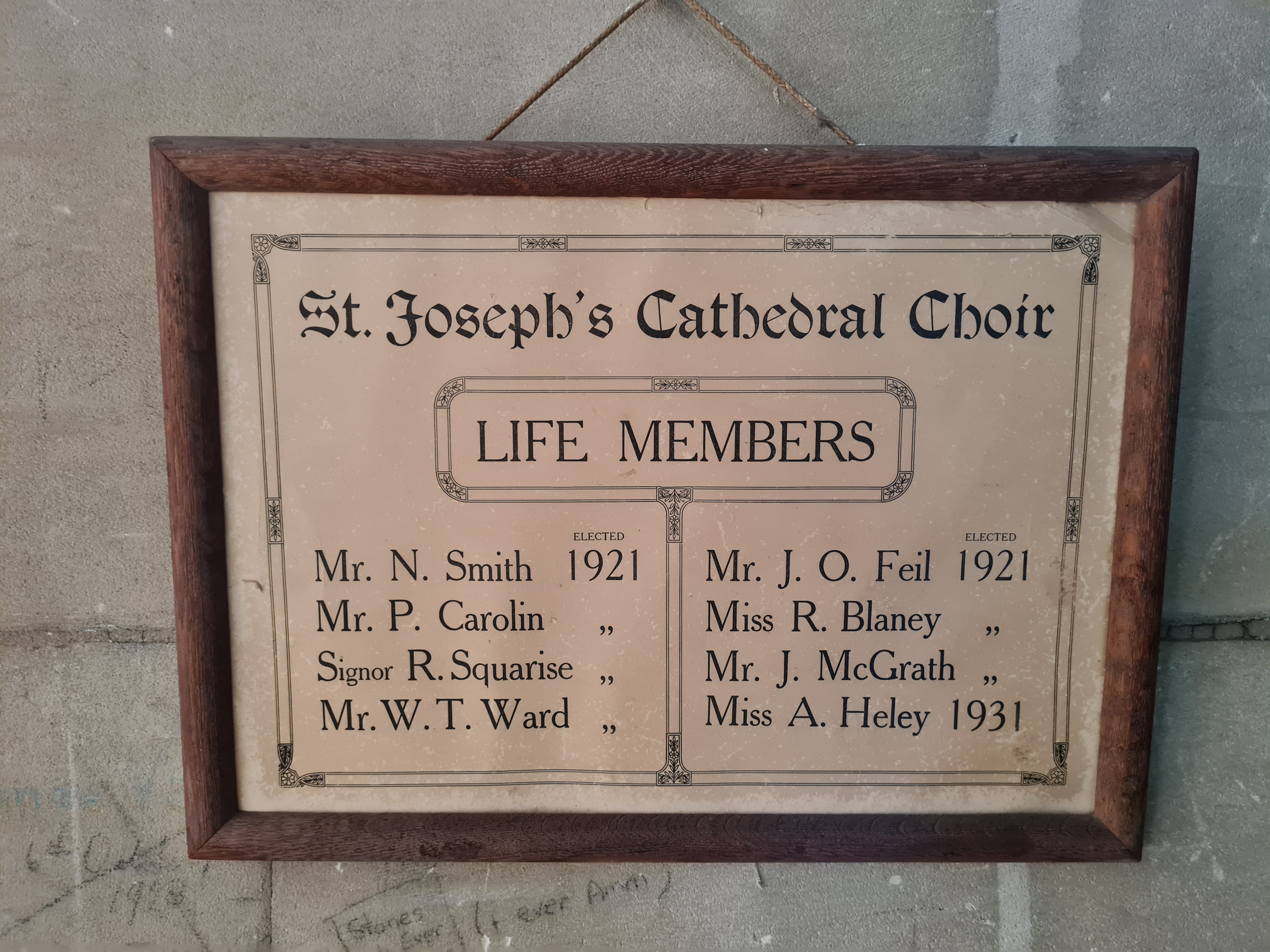
Squarise and other members of St. Joseph's Cathedral Choir with dates of their election as life members (April 2023)

As of 2023, the choir consists of around 15 members and is an affiliate of the Royal School of Church Music New Zealand (RSCMNZ). Since 2017, David Burchell has served as the choirmaster and organist. Burchell also holds the titles of Dunedin City Organist and the conductor of City Choir Dunedin. He succeeded Michael McConnell ARSCM, a recipient of the Benemerenti Medal. McConnell served as choirmaster for 41 years before he died on 4 November 2017. Other recent organists include: John Barker, Dr Kemp English, and Rachel Swindells.

==== History ====
St Joseph's Cathedral Choir was established on 23 July 1862 when Fr Delphin Moreau SM opened the church of St Joseph's. When Bishop Moran arrived in Dunedin to carry out his episcopal duties on 19 February 1871, old St Joseph's Church became the pro-cathedral and the choir assumed its status as a cathedral choir.

English-born Albert Vallis was choirmaster and organist from 1891 until his death in 1932. He arrived in Dunedin from England in 1887, where he held the positions of choirmaster and organist at the Moray Place Congregational Church (Heritage New Zealand) and then at St Matthew’s Church. He composed five compositions during his time as choirmaster at St Joseph's Cathedral. Vallis was also a foundation member of the Otago Society of Organists.

Raffaello Squarise was appointed honorary conductor and choirmaster in March 1891. On 18 August 1891, he was given a letter by the cathedral authorities stating ''a Catholic who figures prominently as a Freemason cannot consistently hold the position of Catholic Cathedral Choirmaster'', after he attended a Masonic installation the day prior. Squarise went public via the Otago Daily Times with the letter he received, which caused more division between himself and Church authorities. In January 1914, he returned as conductor (during Vallis' tenureship as choirmaster and organist) and held the position with honour until 1921. Squarise was elected as a life member of the choir in 1921, which a plaque roll of his name still in the choir loft shows today (pictured).

English-born New Zealand composer and musician, Vernon Griffiths was also choirmaster and organist from 1936 until April 1939. Upon being persuaded by Monsignor Morkane (then-administrator of St Joseph's Cathedral) to take the position of choirmaster, he disbanded the SATB choir, replacing the women section of the choir with boy sopranos and retaining the men tenor and bass choristers. The male-only choir continued to sing plainchant and polyphony during Masses.

== St Dominic's Priory and Cathedral Chapel ==
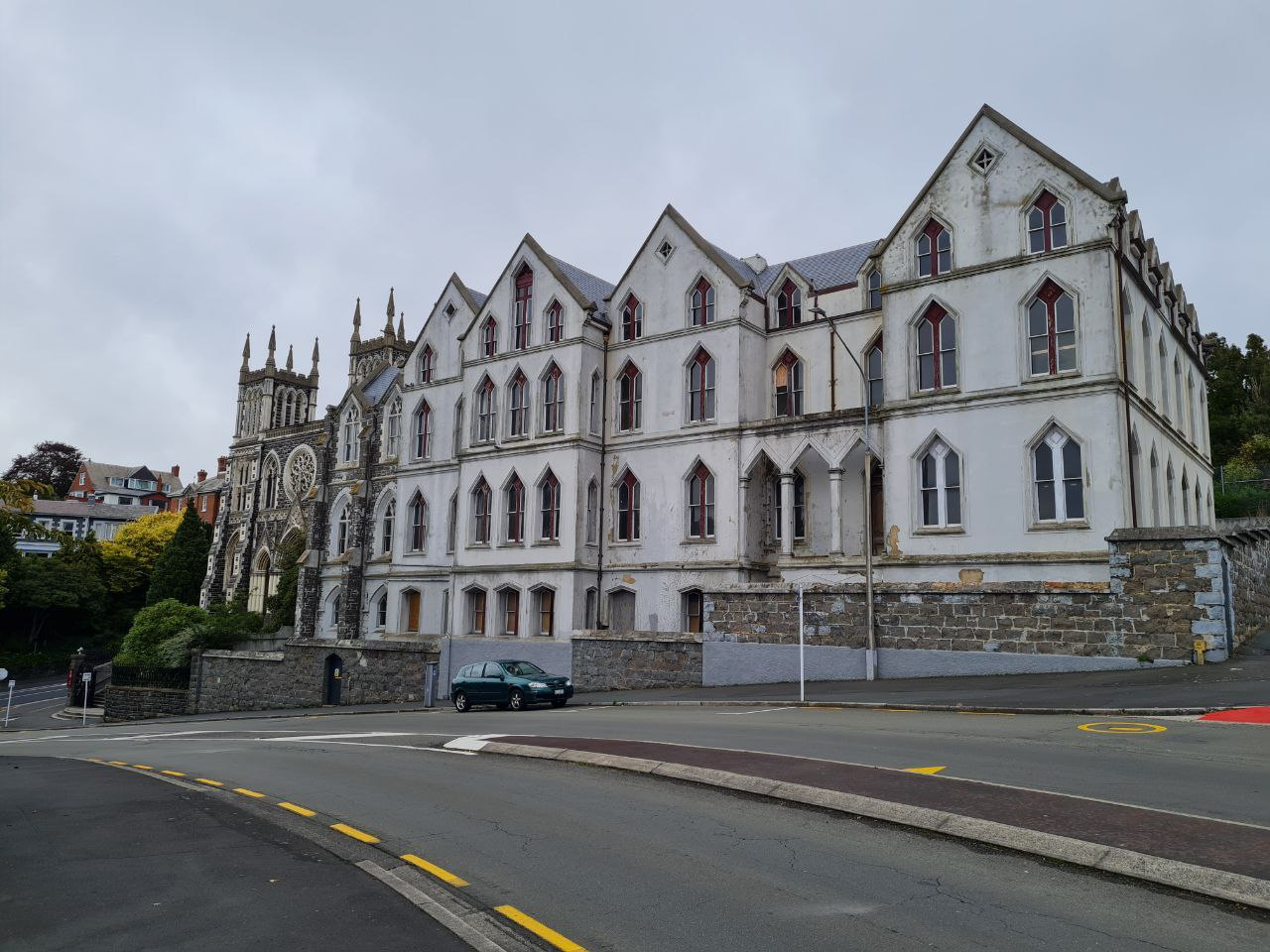
St Dominic's Priory, March 2023

St Dominic's Priory is located beside St Joseph's Cathedral, also designed by Petre, in 1876. When built in 1877, it was the largest unreinforced poured concrete building the Southern Hemisphere and has been described by Heritage New Zealand as "one of New Zealand's most important Victorian buildings". In 1889, a bluestone extension was built to accommodate older students in the newly established St Dominic's College. It holds a Heritage New Zealand Category I listing (No. 372).

In 2020, the Priory was broken into, with intruders ransacking a flat and damaging historic paintings and other irreplaceable property.

The Priory is of neo-Gothic design. It reaches four storeys at gable level and there are over 70 rooms, both large and small, including double-glazed music rooms. The Priory is no longer used for any purpose. Proposals to renovate the Priory, such converting it to a hotel, have been planned, but yet to come to fruition.

The Cathedral Chapel is situated behind the Priory and is still used. It still contains its original High Altar. Mass is celebrated there twice a week and the Traditional Latin Mass is still celebrated there every Sunday. The Cathedral Choir uses the chapel as their practice space.

The Catholic Pastoral Centre, located behind the Cathedral, contains administration offices, the Bishop's office and also the Dunedin Catholic Library.
