= James Liston =

New Zealand archbishop

The Most Reverend James Liston CMG
- 7th Bishop of Auckland
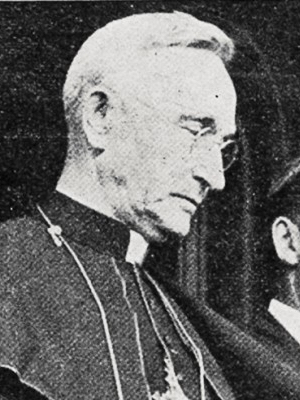
- Liston in 1935
- Church: Catholic Church
- Diocese: Diocese of Auckland
- In office: 9 December 1929 – 7 March 1970
- Predecessor: Henry Cleary
- Successor: Reginald Delargey
- Other post: Titular Archbishop of Domnach Sechnaill (1970–1976)
- Previous posts: Titular Bishop of Olympus (1920–1929); Coadjutor Bishop of Auckland (1920–1929)

Orders
- Ordination: 31 January 1904 by Michael Verdon
- Consecration: 12 December 1920 by Francis Redwood

Personal details
- Born: James Michael Liston; 9 June 1881 Dunedin, New Zealand
- Died: 8 July 1976 (aged 95) Dunedin, New Zealand

James Michael Liston CMG (9 June 1881 – 8 July 1976) was the 7th Roman Catholic Bishop of Auckland, New Zealand.

== Early life ==
James Michael Liston (registered at birth as Michael James Liston) was born in Dunedin on 9 June 1881, one of a family of five children of James Liston, a hotel-keeper, and his wife, Mary (née Sullivan), both emigrants from County Clare, Ireland. He was educated at Christian Brothers' School, Dunedin. At the age of 12 in 1893 he began his training for the priesthood at St Patrick's Seminary, Manly, Sydney. He later attended Holy Cross College, Clonliffe, Dublin (1897–1900), and then went on to the Irish College in Rome from which he graduated in 1903 with a doctorate of divinity.

He was ordained to the priesthood by Bishop Verdon in St Joseph's Cathedral, Dunedin on 31 January 1904. Bishop Verdon placed a strong emphasis on Roman models and on devotion to the Holy See. Liston was deeply influenced by Verdon, who encouraged his vocation, sponsored his studies and was Liston's bishop for the first 14 years of his priesthood. He regarded Verdon as his ultimate role model and throughout his career kept a photograph of Verdon on his desk "for guidance through reflection on his way, and for seeking his heavenly intercession".

He was Rector of the college from 1910. On 12 December 1920, Liston was consecrated as coadjutor Bishop of Auckland under Bishop Cleary, the sixth Roman Catholic Bishop of Auckland, in St Joseph's Cathedral.

== Sedition trial ==
In 1922, during a St Patrick's Day address at Auckland Town Hall he questioned the Anglo-Irish Treaty and described the Irish rebels of 1916 as having been "murdered" by "foreign" (meaning British) troops. He was acquitted at trial in May 1922 of sedition.

== Bishop of Auckland ==
In December 1929, Liston became Auckland's seventh Roman Catholic bishop and remained so for the next 41 years. Liston's decisive support of Bishop Lyons of Christchurch enabled the establishment of Holy Name Seminary as a minor seminary in that city in 1947.

== Rugby league involvement ==
He was the president of the Marist Rugby League Club in 1933.

== Honours and awards ==
In 1935, Liston was awarded the King George V Silver Jubilee Medal, and in 1953 he was awarded the Queen Elizabeth II Coronation Medal.

Liston was appointed Chevalier de la Légion d'Honneur as a foreigner, by a French decree of 15 September 1938, in recognition of his service as Bishop of Auckland. In 1953, he was given the honorary title of archbishop. Two years later, he received an honorary Doctor of Laws (LLD) from the University of Auckland.

In the 1968 New Year Honours, Liston was appointed a Companion of the Order of St Michael and St George.

Liston College in Henderson is named in his honour.

== Last years and death ==
In 1970, aged 88, he retired. He died, aged 95, at the Mater Hospital on 8 July 1976.

== Sources ==
- E.R. Simmons, In Cruce Salus, A History of the Diocese of Auckland 1848 – 1980, Catholic Publication Centre, Auckland 1982.
- Rory Sweetman, Bishop in the Dock: the sedition trial of James Liston, Auckland University Press, Auckland, 1997
- Reid, Nicholas (2006). James Michael Liston: a life. Wellington, NZ: Victoria University Press. ISBN 978-0864735362.
- Nicholas Reid, The Life and Work of Reginald John Delargey Cardinal, Catholic Diocese of Auckland/Pindar, Auckland, 2008.
- Archbishop James Michael Liston Catholic Hierarchy website; retrieved 12 February 2011.

Catholic Church titles
Preceded by –	Coadjutor Bishop of Auckland; 1920–1929	Succeeded by -
Preceded by Henry Cleary	7th Bishop of Auckland; 1929–1970	Succeeded by Reginald Delargey
