= St. Mary's Basilica, Invercargill =

Church in Invercargill, New Zealand

Coordinates: 46.415919°S 168.350946°E

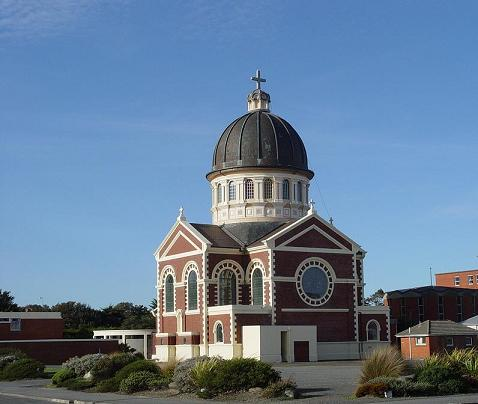
St Mary's Basilica, Invercargill

St. Mary's Basilica is a Catholic Church in Invercargill, New Zealand. It was designed by the celebrated New Zealand architect, Francis Petre and was opened in 1905.

The basilica, named as such because of its style of architecture, rises 37 metres (121 ft) above the ground and is one of the most prominent landmarks in Invercargill. It has been described as the "prettiest church in Australasia". In Roman Catholic ecclesiastical terms, St Mary's Basilica is not a minor basilica. The building is located in Tyne Street, near St Josephs School, the Otepuni Gardens and Te Tomairangi Marae, and is listed as a Category I Historic Place.

The church serves the Catholic community in the Invercargill area, part of the Roman Catholic Diocese of Dunedin.
