= List of New Zealand religious leaders =

The following is a list of New Zealand people who are known best for their role in organised religion.

== Anglican ==
- Alfred Walter Averill - Anglican Archbishop of New Zealand (1925–1940).
- Ernest Chitty (1883-1948), Anglican clergyman. New Zealand´s first blind university graduate.
- Brian Davis (1934–1998) - Anglican Archbishop of New Zealand (1985–1997)
- Octavius Hadfield - Anglican Primate 1890 - 1893
- Allen Howard Johnston - Anglican Primate of New Zealand
- David Moxon - Anglican Bishop of Waikato
- Samuel Tarratt Nevill - First Anglican Bishop of Dunedin
- Paul Reeves - Anglican Archbishop and Governor-General
- George Augustus Selwyn - first Anglican Primate of New Zealand
- William Brown Turei - Anglican Bishop of Aotearoa
- Whakahuihui Vercoe - Anglican Primate of New Zealand 2004-2006
- William Henry Webster - Vicar of Waiuku (1899-1902); Officiate Auckland Diocese (1903-1906)

== Roman Catholic ==
- John Adams (1963–present) - Third Catholic Bishop of Palmerston North (2023–present)
- Brian Patrick Ashby (1923–1988) - Fifth Catholic bishop of Christchurch (1964–1985.)
- Leonard Anthony Boyle (1930-2016) - Fifth Catholic Bishop of Dunedin (1983–2005).
- Matthew Joseph Brodie (1864–1943) - Second Catholic Bishop of Christchurch (1915–1943), first New Zealander by birth to be made a Catholic bishop.
- Denis George Browne (1933 - 2024) - Third Catholic Bishop of Cook Island and Niue (1977–1983); Tenth Catholic Bishop of Auckland (1983–1994); Second Catholic Bishop of Hamilton (1995–2014).
- Colin David Campbell (born 1941) - Sixth Catholic Bishop of Dunedin (2004-2018).
- Henry Cleary - Sixth Catholic Bishop of Auckland (1910–1929).
- Thomas William Croke - Second Catholic Bishop of Auckland (1870–1874).
- Peter Cullinane (born 1936) -First Catholic Bishop of Palmerston North (1980–2012).
- John Cunneen (1932–2010) - Eighth Catholic Bishop of the Christchurch (1995–2007).
- Reginald John Cardinal Delargey (1914-1979) - Cardinal-Priest of Immacolata al Tiburtino (1976–1979), Eighth Bishop of Auckland (1970–1974); Fourth Archbishop of Wellington and Metropolitan of New Zealand (1974–1978)
- John Atcherley Cardinal Dew (born 1948) - Cardinal-Priest of Sant’Ippolito (2015–present); Sixth Archbishop of Wellington and Metropolitan of New Zealand (2005–present)
- Owen John Dolan (born 1928) - Catholic Coadjutor Bishop Emeritus of Palmerston North, Coadjutor Bishop of Palmerston North (1995–2004)
- Michael Dooley - Seventh Catholic Bishop of Dunedin (2018–present)
- Paul Donoghue SM (born 1949) - Sixth Catholic Bishop of Rarotonga (2011–present)
- Charles Drennan (born 1960) - Second Catholic Bishop of Palmerston North (2012–2019)
- Patrick Dunn - Eleventh Catholic Bishop of Auckland, New Zealand (1995–present)
- Edward Gaines - First Catholic Bishop of Hamilton (1980–1994)
- Reynaldo Getalado - Seventh Bishop of Rarotonga (2024 - present)
- Michael Gielen (born 1971) - Eleventh Catholic Bishop of Christchurch (2022 - present)
- John Joseph Grimes (1842–1915) - First Catholic bishop of Christchurch (1887–1915)
- Denis William Hanrahan (1933–1987) -Sixth Catholic Bishop of Christchurch, New Zealand (1985–1987).
- Barry Jones (1941–2016) - Ninth Catholic Bishop of Christchurch (2007–2016)
- Edward Michael Joyce (1904–1964) - Fourth Catholic bishop of Christchurch (1950–1964).
- John Kavanagh (1913–1985) - Fourth Catholic Bishop of Dunedin (1949–1985).
- Richard Laurenson - Fourth Bishop of Hamilton (2023–present)
- Robin Walsh Leamy SM (born 1935) -Catholic Bishop of Rarotonga, Cook Islands and Niue (1984–1996), Auxiliary Bishop of Auckland (1996–present).
- George Lenihan OSB - Fifth Catholic Bishop of Auckland (1896–1910).
- James Liston - Archbishop; Seventh Catholic Bishop of Auckland (1929-1970).
- Stephen Marmion Lowe - Third Catholic Bishop of Hamilton (2015-2021); Twelfth Bishop of Auckland (2021–present)
- John Luck OSB - Fourth Catholic Bishop of Auckland (1882–1896)
- Patrick James Lyons (1903–1967) - Third Catholic Bishop of Christchurch (1944–1950), Auxiliary Bishop of Sydney (1950–1957) and fourth Bishop of Bishop of Sale (1957–1967).
- John Mackey - Eighth Catholic Bishop of Auckland (1974–1983)
- Max Takuira Matthew Mariu SM (1952–2005), Auxiliary Catholic Bishop of Hamilton (1988–2005)
- Paul Martin SM (born 1967) – Tenth Catholic Bishop of Christchurch (2017–2021); Coadjutor-Archbishop of Wellington (2021–present)
- Peter Thomas Bertram Cardinal McKeefry (1899-1973) - Cardinal-Priest of Immacolata al Tiburtino (1969-1973); Third Archbishop of Wellington and Metropolitan of New Zealand (1954–1973)
- Basil Meeking (born 1929, Bishop Emeritus of Christchurch (1995-) 7th Catholic Bishop of Christchurch 1987–1995).
- Patrick Moran - First Catholic Bishop of Dunedin
- Stuart France O'Connell SM (born 1935), Fifth Catholic Bishop of Rarotonga (1996 - )
- Hugh John O'Neill - Catholic Coadjutor Bishop of Dunedin (1943–1946)
- Thomas O'Shea - Second Catholic Archbishop of Wellington and Metropolitan of New Zealand (1935–1954)
- Jean Baptiste Pompallier - First Catholic Bishop of Auckland (1838–1870)
- Francis William Mary Redwood - First Catholic Archbishop of Wellington and Metropolitan of New Zealand (1875–1935)
- John Hubert Macey Rodgers SM (1915–1997) - Vicar Apostolic of Tonga (1953–1957), Vicar Apostolic of Tonga and Niue (1957–1966), Bishop of Tonga (1966–1973), Bishop of Rarotonga (1973–1977), Auxiliary Bishop of Auckland (1977–1985), Superior of the Mission, Funafuti, Tuvalu (1986).
- Owen Noel Snedden (1962–1981) - Catholic Auxiliary Bishop of Wellington (1962–1981)
- Walter Steins SJ - Archbishop; Third Catholic Bishop of Auckland (1879–1881)
- Michael Verdon (1838–1918) - Second Catholic Bishop of Dunedin (1896–1918)
- Philippe-Joseph Viard SM - Vicar Apostolic/Administrator Apostolic of Wellington (1848–1860); First Catholic Bishop of Wellington (1860–1872)
- Thomas Stafford Cardinal Williams (1930–2023) - Cardinal-Priest of Gesù Divin Maestro alla Pineta Sacchetti (1983–present); Fifth Archbishop of Wellington and Metropolitan of New Zealand (1979–2005)
- James Whyte - Third Catholic Bishop of Dunedin, New Zealand (1920–1957)

== Others ==
- Brian Tamaki - founder of Destiny Church
- Lloyd Geering - theologian
- Herman van Staveren (1849-1930), New Zealand rabbi
- Samuel Aaron Goldstein (12 June 1852 – 29 May 1935), New Zealand rabbi, scholar and community leader
- Mazhar Krasniqi - First President of the Federation of Islamic Associations of New Zealand
- Wallace Fard Muhammad - (disputed) Born as Wallace Dodd Ford, a New Zealand national, founder of Nation of Islam
- Richard James Waugh (born 1957) - former National Superintendent of the Wesleyan Methodist Church of New Zealand
