= List of Catholic bishops in New Zealand =

The following is a list of past and present Catholic Bishops in New Zealand.

- John Adams (born 1963) – Third Bishop of Palmerston North (2023–present)
- Brian Patrick Ashby (1923–1988) – Fifth Bishop of Christchurch (1964–1985)
- Leonard Boyle (1930–2016) – Fifth Bishop of Dunedin (1983–2005)
- Matthew Joseph Brodie (1864–1943) – Second Bishop of Christchurch (1915–1943), first New Zealander by birth to be made a Catholic bishop
- Denis George Browne (1937–2024) – Third Bishop of Rarotonga (1977–1983); Tenth Bishop of Auckland (1983–1994); Second Bishop of Hamilton (1995–2014)
- Colin Campbell (born 1941) – Sixth Bishop of Dunedin (2004–2018)
- Henry Cleary (1859–1929) – Sixth Bishop of Auckland (1910–1929)
- Thomas William Croke (1824–1902) – Second Bishop of Auckland (1870–1874)
- Peter Cullinane (born 1936) – First Bishop of Palmerston North (1980–2012)
- John Cunneen (1932–2010) – Eighth Bishop of Christchurch (1995–2007)
- Reginald John Delargey (1914–1979) – Cardinal-Priest of Immacolata al Tiburtino (1976–1979); Eighth Bishop of Auckland (1970–1974); Fourth Archbishop of Wellington and Metropolitan of New Zealand (1974–1978)
- John Atcherley Dew (born 1948) – Cardinal-Priest of Sant’Ippolito (2015–present); Sixth Archbishop of Wellington and Metropolitan of New Zealand (2005–2023)
- Owen John Dolan (1928–2025) – Coadjutor Bishop of Palmerston North (1995–2004)
- Michael Dooley (born 1961) – Seventh Bishop of Dunedin (2018–present)
- Paul Donoghue SM (born 1949) – Sixth Bishop of Rarotonga (2011–2024)
- Charles Edward Drennan (born 1960) – Second Bishop of Palmerston North (2012–2019)
- Patrick Dunn (born 1950) – Auxiliary Bishop of Auckland (1994); Eleventh Bishop of Auckland (1994–2021)
- Edward Gaines (1926–1994) – First Bishop of Hamilton (1980–1994)
- Reynaldo Getalado (born 1959) – Seventh Bishop of Rarotonga (2024–present)
- Michael Gielen (born 1971) – Auxiliary Bishop of Auckland (2020–2022); Seventh Bishop of Christchurch (2022–present)
- John Grimes (1842–1915) – First Bishop of Christchurch (1887–1915)
- Denis William Hanrahan (1933–1987) – Sixth Bishop of Christchurch (1985–1987)
- Barry Jones (1941–2016) – Ninth Bishop of Christchurch (2007–2016)
- Edward Michael Joyce (1904–1964) – Fourth Bishop of Christchurch (1950–1964)
- John Kavanagh (1913–1985) – Fourth Bishop of Dunedin (1949–1985)
- Richard Laurenson (born 1968) – Fourth Bishop of Hamilton (2023–present)
- Robin Walsh Leamy SM (1934–2022) – Fourth Bishop of Rarotonga (1984–1996), Auxiliary Bishop of Auckland (1996–2009)
- George Lenihan OSB (1858–1910) – Fifth Bishop of Auckland (1896–1910)
- James Liston (1881–1976) – Coadjutor Bishop of Auckland (1921–1929); Seventh Bishop of Auckland (1929–1970) (with title of Archbishop)
- Stephen Marmion Lowe (born 1962) – Third Bishop of Hamilton (2015–2021); Twelfth Bishop of Auckland (2021–present)
- John Luck OSB (1840–1896) – Fourth Bishop of Auckland (1882–1896)
- Patrick James Lyons (1903–1967) – Third Bishop of Christchurch (1944–1950), Auxiliary Bishop of Sydney (1950–1957) and fourth Bishop of Sale (1957–1967)
- John Mackey (1918–2014) – Ninth Bishop of Auckland (1974–1983)
- Max Takuira Matthew Mariu SM (1952–2005), Auxiliary Bishop of Hamilton (1988–2005)
- Paul Martin SM (born 5 May 1967) – Seventh Archbishop of Wellington and Metropolitan of New Zealand (2023–present); Tenth Bishop of Christchurch (2016–2019); Apostolic Administrator of Christchurch (2019–2023)
- Peter Thomas Bertram McKeefry (1899–1973) – Cardinal-Priest of Immacolata al Tiburtino (1969–1973); Third Archbishop of Wellington and Metropolitan of New Zealand (1954–1973)
- Basil Meeking (1929–2020) – Seventh Bishop of Christchurch (1987–1995)
- Patrick Moran (1823–1895) – First Bishop of Dunedin
- Stuart France O'Connell SM (1935–2019) – Fifth Bishop of Rarotonga (1996–2011)
- Hugh O'Neill (1898–1955) – Coadjutor Bishop Dunedin (1943–1946)
- Thomas O'Shea (1870–1954) – Second Archbishop of Wellington and Metropolitan of New Zealand (1935–1954)
- Jean Baptiste Pompallier (1802–1871) – Vicar Apostolic of Western Oceania (1836–1842); Vicar Apostolic of New Zealand (1842–1848); First Bishop of Auckland (1848–1869)
- Francis William Mary Redwood SM (1839–1935) – Second Bishop of Wellington (1875–1887); First Archbishop of Wellington and Metropolitan of New Zealand (1887–1935)
- John Hubert Macey Rodgers SM (1915–1997) – Vicar Apostolic of Tonga (1953–1957), Vicar Apostolic of Tonga and Niue (1957–1966), First Bishop of Tonga (1966–1973), Second Bishop of Rarotonga (1973–1977), Auxiliary Bishop of Auckland (1977–1985), Superior of the Mission, Funafuti, Tuvalu (1986)
- Owen Noel Snedden (1917–1981) – Auxiliary Bishop of Wellington (1962–1981)
- Walter Steins Bisschop SJ (1810–1881) – Third Bishop of Auckland (1879–1881) (with title of Archbishop)
- Michael Verdon (1838–1918) – Second Bishop of Dunedin (1896–1918)
- Philippe-Joseph Viard SM (1809–1872) – Vicar Apostolic/Administrator Apostolic of Wellington (1848–1860); First Bishop of Wellington (1860–1872)
- Thomas Stafford Williams (1930–2023) – Cardinal-Priest of Gesù Divin Maestro alla Pineta Sacchetti (1983–2023); Fifth Archbishop of Wellington and Metropolitan of New Zealand (1979–2005)
- James Whyte (1868–1957) – Third Bishop of Dunedin, New Zealand (1920–1957)
