= Michael Gielen (bishop) =

Catholic bishop in New Zealand

The Most Reverend Michael Gielen
- 11th Bishop of Christchurch
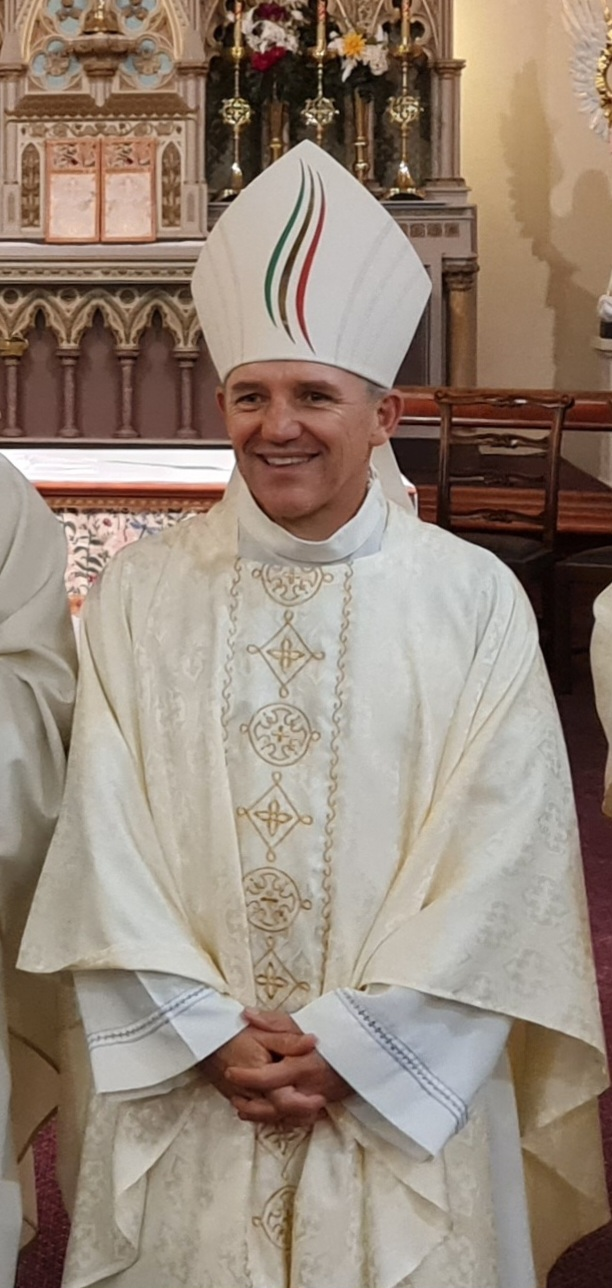
- Gielen in 2024
- Diocese: Roman Catholic Diocese of Christchurch
- Installed: 21 May 2022
- Predecessor: Paul Martin SM

Orders
- Ordination: 1997 (as priest) by Max Mariu
- Consecration: 2020 (as bishop) by Patrick Dunn; Stephen Lowe; Peter Cullinane

Personal details
- Born: Michael Andrew Gielen; 2 June 1971 (age 55) Cambridge, New Zealand
- Denomination: Roman Catholic Church
- Occupation: Roman Catholic bishop
- Profession: Cleric
- Education: Holy Cross Seminary, New Zealand; Franciscan University of Steubenville, Steubenville, Ohio, U.S. Pontifical Gregorian University, Rome, Italy

Michael Andrew Gielen (born 2 June 1971) is a New Zealand prelate of the Roman Catholic Church. He has served as the 11th Bishop of Christchurch, New Zealand since May 2022. Gielen was previously auxiliary Bishop of the Diocese of Auckland.

== Early life and education ==
Gielen was born in Cambridge and raised in Tokoroa, the son of Henk and Maureen Gielen and the oldest of six siblings. He received his secondary education at Forest View High School, Tokoroa. After studying at Holy Cross Seminary (then located in Mosgiel), he was ordained as a priest in 1997 in Tokoroa by Bishop Max Mariu, SM, Auxiliary Bishop of Hamilton, New Zealand, the first Māori Catholic bishop. Gielen was the only priest ever ordained by Bishop Mariu. He worked in parish ministry in the Hamilton diocese serving in parishes in the East Coast, Waikato, North Waikato and Raglan. He studied at the Franciscan University of Steubenville and at the Gregorian University in Rome. From 2014 until 2019, he served as director of formation at Holy Cross Seminary in Auckland.

== Episcopacy ==
=== Auxiliary bishop of Auckland ===
On 6 January 2020, Gielen was appointed auxiliary bishop of Auckland by Pope Francis as the titular bishop of Abbir Maius. He was ordained bishop at the Vodafone Event Centre, Manukau, Auckland on Saturday 7 March 2020 in the presence of 3,000 people. The principal consecrator was Bishop Patrick James Dunn and the principal co-consecrators were Bishop Stephen Lowe and Bishop Peter Cullinane The deacon at the ordination Mass was Deacon Henk Gielen of Papamoa, Michael Gielen's father. Other bishops participating included Cardinal John Dew, Bishop Michael Dooley, Bishop Colin Campbell, Bishop Basil Meeking, Bishop Owen Dolan, Bishop Denis Browne and Bishop Richard Umbers. The papal bull of appointment was read, on behalf of the Apostolic Nuncio, Archbishop Novatus Rugambwa, by Monsignor Edward Karaan, Deputy Head of Mission and First Secretary at the Apostolic Nunciature in Wellington.

=== Bishop of Christchurch ===
On 21 May 2022, Pope Francis appointed Gielen as the 11th Bishop of Christchurch. He was installed as bishop in July 2022.

== Personal life ==
Gielen is a keen cyclist. In 2015, he and seven seminarians of Holy Cross Seminary cycled for 33 days from Cape Reinga at the northern end of the North Island to Bluff on the southern coast of the South Island to promote vocations for the priesthood. He also enjoys participating in rugby union, cricket and golf.

== See also ==
- List of New Zealand Catholic bishops
- List of New Zealand religious leaders
- Christianity in New Zealand

Catholic Church titles
Preceded by Paul Martin	11th Bishop of Christchurch; 2022–present	Succeeded by Incumbent
Preceded by	Auxiliary Bishop of Auckland; 2020–2022	Succeeded by
