= Catholic Church in New Zealand =

- Hāhi Katorika ki Aotearoa
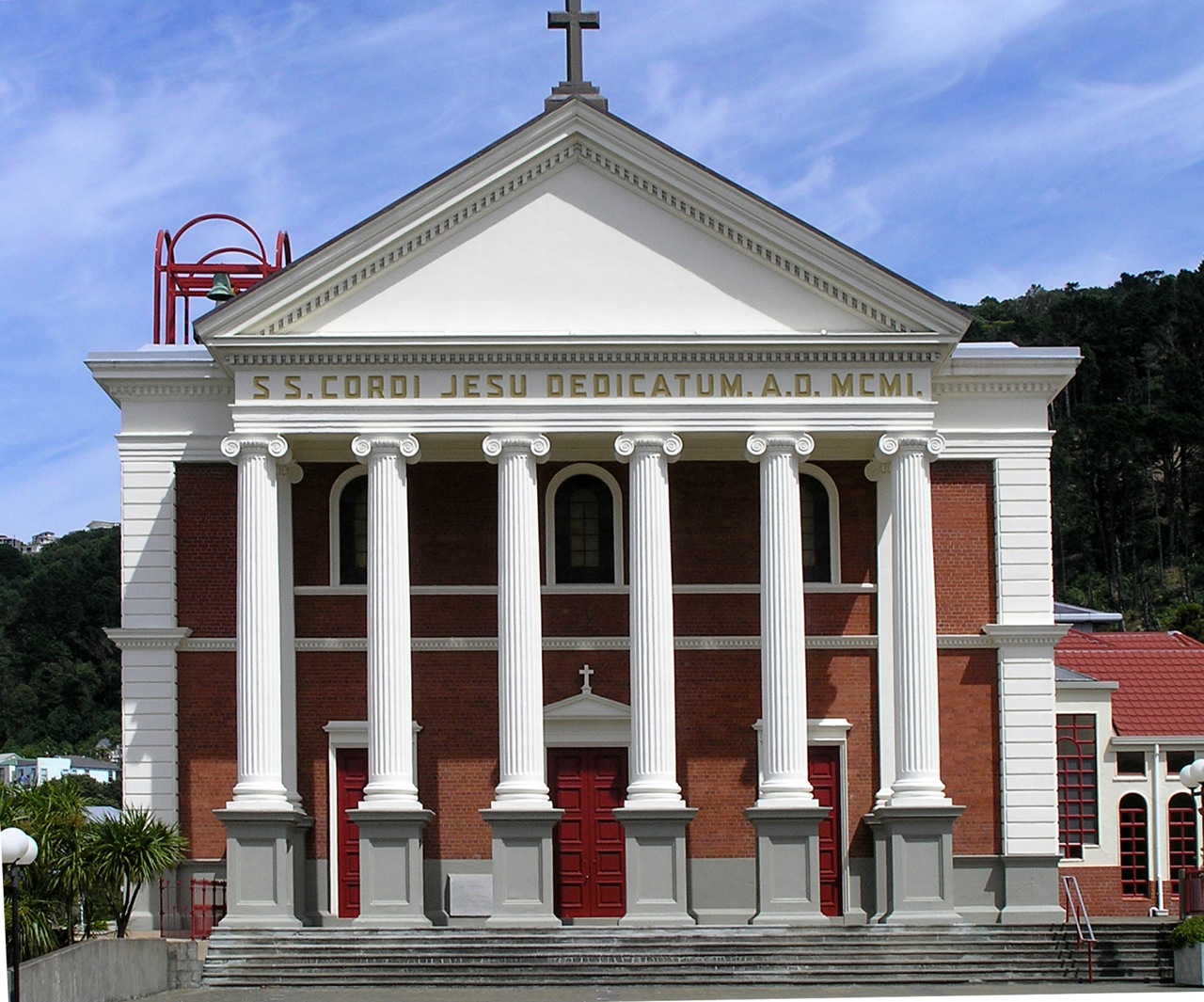
- Sacred Heart Cathedral, Wellington
- Classification: Catholic
- Orientation: Latin
- Polity: Episcopal
- Pope: Leo XIV
- Archbishop: Paul Martin
- Region: New Zealand
- Language: English, Latin
- Headquarters: Viard House, Sacred Heart Cathedral, Wellington
- Origin: 1842 (vicariate)
- Number of followers: 470,919 (2018)
- Official website: catholic.org.nz

The Catholic Church in New Zealand (Māori: Te Hāhi Katorika ki Aotearoa) is part of the worldwide Catholic Church under the leadership of the Pope in Rome, assisted by the Roman Curia, and with the New Zealand bishops.

Catholicism was introduced to New Zealand in 1838 by missionaries from France, who converted Māori. As settlers from the British Isles arrived in New Zealand, many of them Irish Catholics, the Catholic Church became a settler church rather than a mission to Māori.

According to the 2023 census, "Catholicism" was the largest single Christian religious affiliation in New Zealand, with 449,484 adherents, while the second-largest was "Christian (not further defined)," which recorded 364,644.

In New Zealand there is one archdiocese (Wellington) and five suffragan dioceses (Auckland, Christchurch, Dunedin, Hamilton and Palmerston North). The church is overseen by the New Zealand Catholic Bishops' Conference. Its primate is the Metropolitan Archbishop of Wellington, who has been Paul Martin since 2023.

== History ==
=== Beginnings ===
The first Christian service conducted in New Zealand waters may have occurred if Father Paul-Antoine Léonard de Villefeix, the Dominican chaplain of the French navigator, Jean-François de Surville, celebrated Mass in Doubtless Bay, near Whatuwhiwhi, on Christmas Day, 1769.

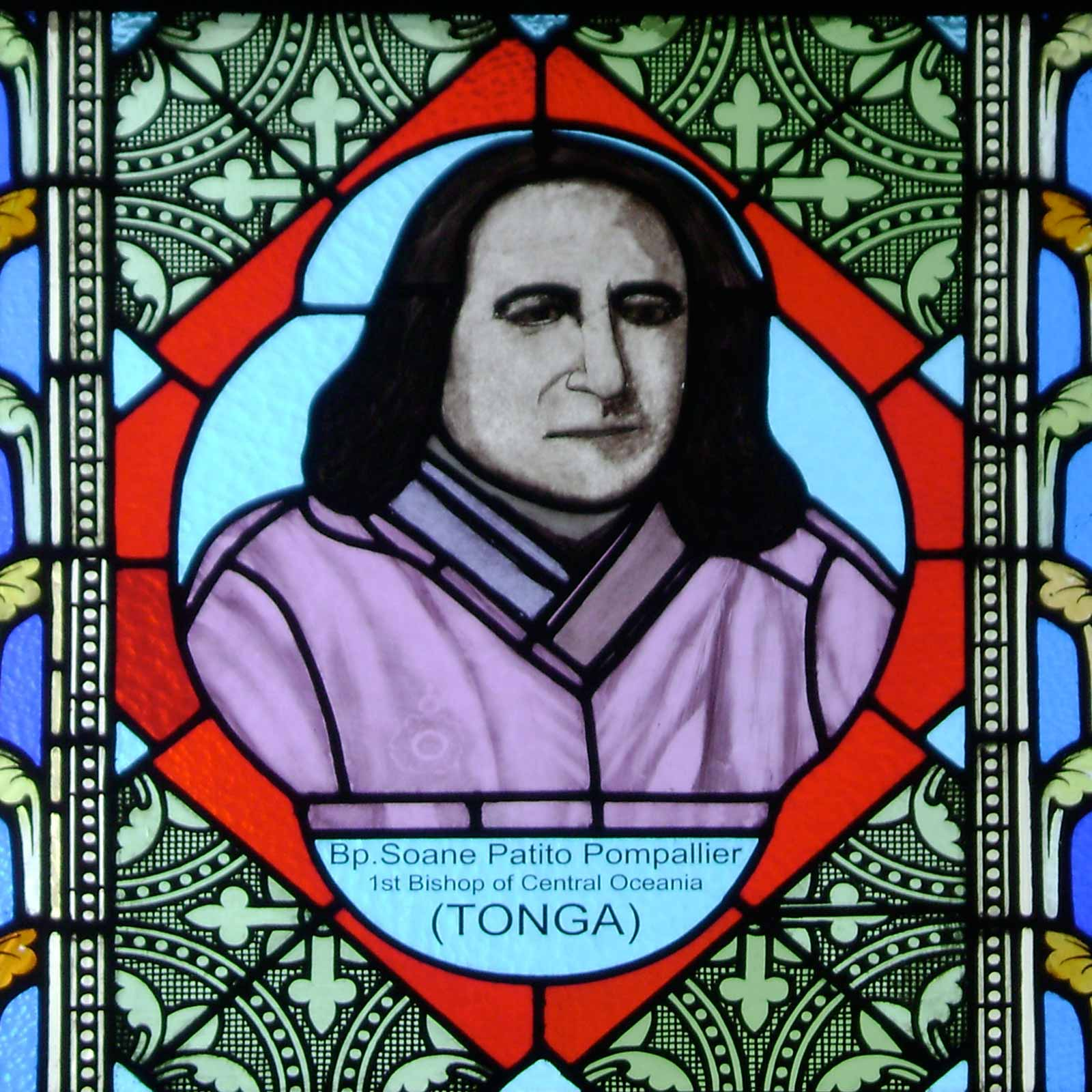
Jean Baptiste Pompallier, first bishop of Oceania, residing in New Zealand, depicted on a glass-in-lead window in Tonga

Nearly 70 years later, in January 1838, another Frenchman, Bishop Jean Baptiste Pompallier (1807–1871) arrived in New Zealand as the Vicar Apostolic of Western Oceania. He made New Zealand the centre of his activities, which covered a vast area in the Pacific. He celebrated his first Mass in New Zealand at Totara Point, Hokianga, at the home of an Irish family, Thomas and Mary Poynton and their children, on 13 January 1838. Pompallier was accompanied by members of the Society of Mary (Marists), and more soon arrived. The mission headquarters were established in Kororāreka (later called Russell) where the Marists constructed a building (now called Pompallier) from pisé and set up a printing press. As well as stationing missionaries in the north, Pompallier began work in the Bay of Plenty, in the Waikato amongst Māori, and in Auckland and Wellington areas amongst European settlers. In 1840, New Zealand became a British colony with the signing of the Treaty of Waitangi. The number of Catholic colonists comprised fewer than 500, from a total number of around 5000.

The Catholic Church established New Zealand as a separate vicariate in 1842.

=== The mission splits ===
As a result of disagreement between Pompallier and Jean-Claude Colin, Superior of the Marists in France, Rome agreed to divide New Zealand into two ecclesiastical administrations from 1850. Pompallier became Bishop of Auckland and the Marist Bishop Philippe Viard (1809–1872) took charge of Wellington, which included the southern half of the North Island and the whole of the South Island. This decision meant that much of the Māori mission in the North (where most Māori lived) was abandoned; the Marists working in what became the Auckland diocese, including those who spoke Māori, moved to Wellington. However, Pompallier, who was in Europe in 1850, returned to New Zealand with more priests, the first Sisters of Mercy and ten seminarians, whose training was quickly completed. All but one of them were ordained within five weeks, and their training was the origin of St Mary's Seminary founded in that year.

Increasingly, the Catholic Church in New Zealand was preoccupied with meeting the needs of the settler community. Many of the Catholic settlers were from Ireland, with some from England and Scotland. In the 19th century some were from English recusant gentry families, including Sir Charles Clifford, 1st Baronet (first Speaker of the New Zealand House of Representatives), Frederick Weld (sixth Premier of New Zealand) and their cousin William Vavasour.

The Wellington diocese was divided into three dioceses, with Dunedin (1869) and later Christchurch (1887) being established in the South Island. In 1887, New Zealand became a separate ecclesiastical province. The hierarchy was established with Wellington becoming the archiepiscopal see. In 1900 Holy Cross College, Mosgiel, a national seminary for the training of priests, was opened. In 1907, when New Zealand was created a Dominion, there were 126,995 Catholics out of a total European settler population of 888,578.

On 5 February 1859 the New Zealander published the annual report of the Bible Society Auckland auxiliary, which contained anti-Catholic sentiment. The most offensive of which being a false claim of biblioclasm in Quebec.

It is quite evident that the main impediment to the circulation of the Scriptures among the French Canadian population is the Roman Priesthood. Bible-burning is resorted to whenever the priest can overawe his credulous parishioners, yet it is not without its significance, that the very inveteracy of this opposition begins to astonish the people, who cannot understand the uneasiness of their priest on the advent of a colporteur, nor his unceasing hostility to the circulation of a book which he is unable to condemn when brought to him for inspection. Thus, God may employ the weapons of the adversary against himself, and cause the glorious Gospel of Jesus to triumph over the Papal Antichrist in this country.

In response to this report deputy-editor of the rival Southern Cross and Catholic James McCabe wrote an article that contained an objurgation of the anti-Catholic sentiment and tone of the report. This led to a controversy that played out primarily in the newspapers that lasted until August. Governor Thomas Gore Browne, honorary president of the auxiliary, wrote to Bishop Pompallier to note his disapproval of the anti-Catholic sentiment in the report the day after McCabe's letter was published. Pompallier responded favourably to Browne's letter however the response was leaked to the New Zealander and stirred up Protestant outrage for the Governor's deference to the Bishop. The Auckland Examiner was the voice of Catholics in this controversy. After Pompallier returned to France in June the controversy began to die off.

=== Māori ===
After 1850, the Māori mission continued in the Auckland diocese in an attenuated form and could not be revived until after the New Zealand Wars of the 1860s. The survival of the Māori church during the remaining decades of the 19th century was in large part due to Māori catechists – many of them trained at Pompallier's St Mary's Seminary. James McDonald was the only missionary to the Māori in the late 1870s. In 1880, Archbishop Steins, the Bishop of Auckland, gave McDonald charge of the Māori mission. In 1886, Bishop John Edmund Luck obtained Mill Hill Fathers for the mission. In spite of inadequate resources, the priests were very active. Some, like Father Carl Kreijmborg, were "builder-priests", themselves erecting churches. They also started credit unions, piggeries, dairy farms, and co-operative stores. Many of the priests were German or Dutch and they made lifelong commitments to their Māori communities. Some became more proficient in Māori than in English.

In the Wellington diocese the Marists continued their work, to a limited extent, amongst Māori, notably at Ōtaki. Mother Aubert (see below) contributed significantly in Hawke's Bay and later in Jerusalem. Catholic secondary schools for Māori were established: St Joseph's Māori Girls' College, Napier (1867) by the Sisters of Our Lady of the Missions; Hato Petera College, Northcote (1928) by the Mill Hill Fathers (later staffed by the Marist Brothers who had arrived in New Zealand in 1876); and, in 1948, Hato Paora College was opened by the Marist Fathers. The first Māori Catholic priest, Father Wiremu Te Awhitu was ordained in 1944, and the first Māori Catholic bishop, Bishop Max Mariu was ordained in 1988.

=== Religious orders ===
Many Catholic religious orders came to New Zealand. The Sisters of Mercy arrived in Auckland in 1850 – the first order of religious sisters to come to New Zealand – and began work in health care and education. The Congregation of Our Lady of the Missions arrived in Napier in 1867. When Patrick Moran arrived as the first Catholic Bishop of Dunedin in February 1871, he was accompanied by ten Dominican nuns from the Sion Hill Convent, Dublin, and they proceeded to establish their schools within days of unpacking. In 1876, the same bishop obtained the services of the Christian Brothers who opened their Dunedin school in that year. In 1880, the Sisters of St Joseph of Nazareth came from Bathurst to Whanganui where they opened 7 schools between 1880 and 1900. The Sisters of St Joseph of the Sacred Heart arrived in New Zealand in 1883 and established their first community at Temuka, South Canterbury. During the next twenty years Mary MacKillop (St Mary of the Cross), the founder of that congregation, visited New Zealand four times to support her sisters. Suzanne Aubert, who had come to New Zealand in 1860 at the invitation of Bishop Pompallier, and had worked in Auckland and Hawke's Bay, established her order the Sisters of Compassion in Jerusalem in 1892 and brought it to New Zealand in 1899. In 1997 the New Zealand Bishops' Conference agreed to support the "Introduction of the Cause of Suzanne Aubert", to begin the process of consideration for her canonisation as a saint by the Church. In the 20th century many other orders became established in New Zealand, including the Carmelite nuns in Christchurch and Auckland and the Cistercians in Hawke's Bay.

=== Development ===
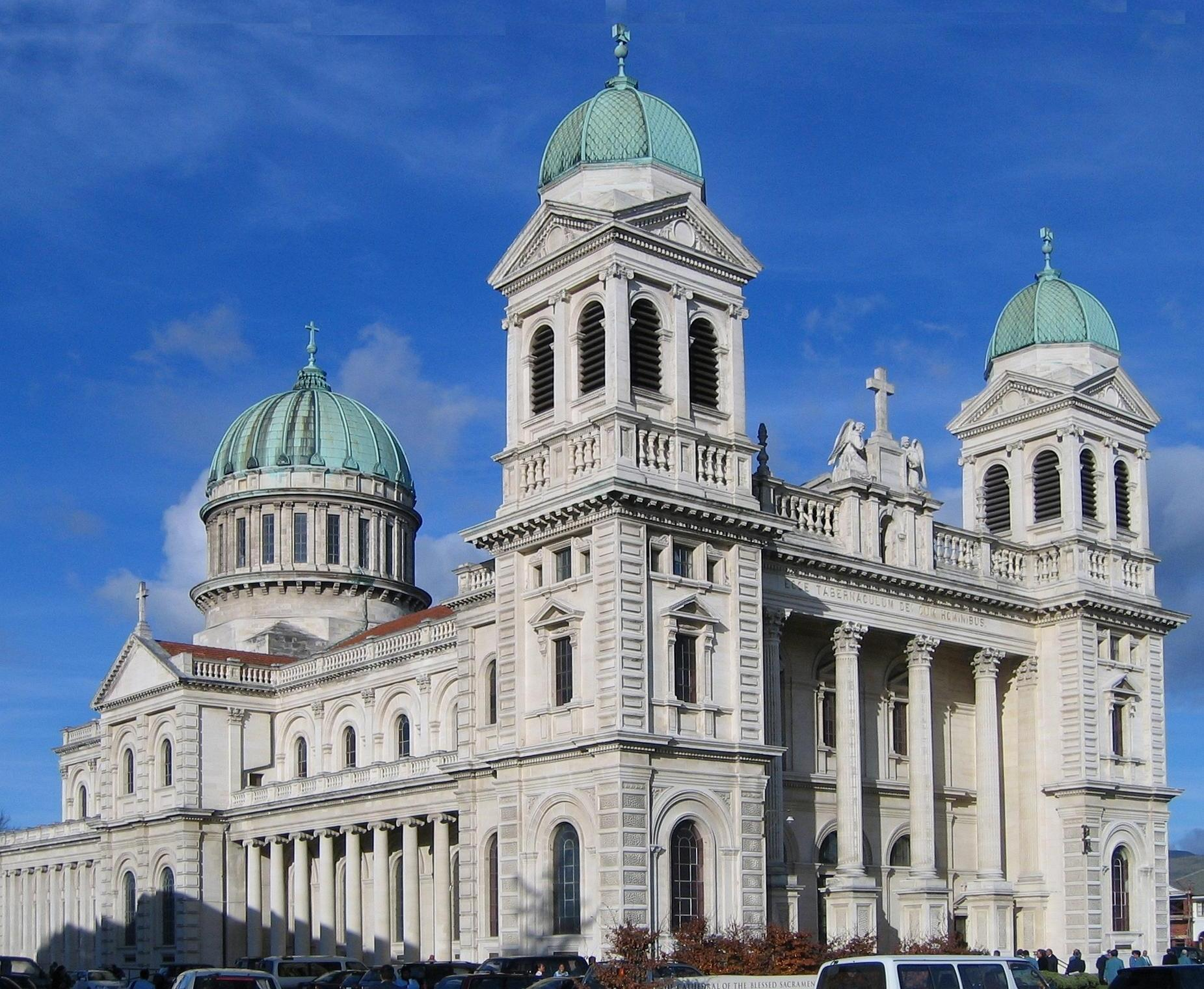
The former Cathedral of the Blessed Sacrament, Christchurch, Francis Petre's largest completed work (1905)

The prominence of churches in New Zealand's cities, towns and countryside attests to the historical importance of Catholicism in New Zealand.

St Patrick's Cathedral is the cathedral of the Catholic Bishop of Auckland. It is on the original site granted by the Crown to Bishop Pompallier in 1841; it was renovated and re-opened in September 2007. St Joseph's Cathedral, Dunedin, was constructed between 1878 and 1886. Sacred Heart Cathedral is the cathedral of the Archdiocese of Wellington and was opened in 1901 (in place of the destroyed St Mary's Cathedral), although it was not until 1984 that it became officially the cathedral. The highly esteemed Cathedral of the Blessed Sacrament, Christchurch, was opened in 1905. The latter three buildings were designed by the prominent New Zealand Catholic architect Francis Petre. In 1947 another seminary, Holy Name Seminary, was opened in Christchurch. The cathedral of the Hamilton Diocese is the Cathedral of the Blessed Virgin Mary (built in 1975, rededicated in 1980 and renovated in 2008), and the cathedral of the Palmerston North Diocese is the Cathedral of the Holy Spirit (built in 1925, renovated and rededicated in 1980).

=== Church today ===
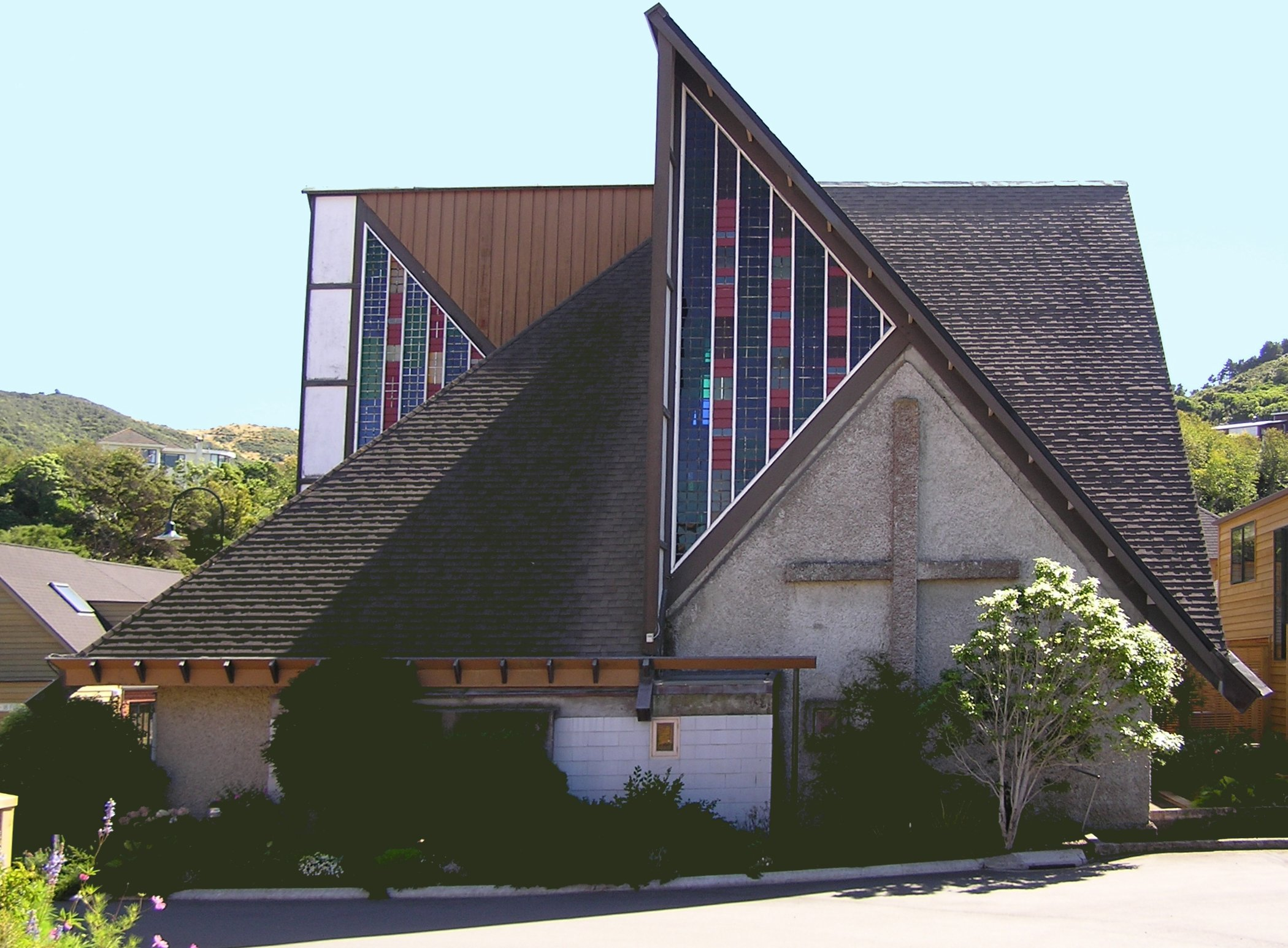
The iconic Futuna Chapel, Wellington, was built in the 1960s and marked a deviation from traditional church architecture.

Changing social attitudes in the 1950s and 60s and the sweeping changes ushered in by the Second Vatican Council affected the Catholic Church in New Zealand – including in areas of liturgy and church architecture. From 1970 Mass in New Zealand was said in either English or Māori. The iconic Futuna Chapel was built as a Wellington retreat centre for the Marist order in 1961; the design by Māori architect John Scott fused Modernist and indigenous design principles and marked a deviation from traditional church architecture.

On 6 March 1980, the Auckland Diocese and the Wellington Archdiocese were split to create the dioceses of Hamilton and Palmerston North respectively. There have been four New Zealand cardinals, of which all four held the position, successively, of Archbishop of Wellington and Metropolitan of New Zealand: Peter McKeefry, Reginald Delargey, Thomas Stafford Williams and John Atcherley Dew.

Pope John Paul II became the first pope to visit New Zealand, in November 1986. He was given an official state welcome, and presided at ceremonies attended by thousands. He called for respect between cultures in New Zealand:

The Māori people have maintained their identity in this land. The peoples coming from Europe and more recently from Asia have not come to a desert. They have come to a land already marked by a rich and ancient heritage, and they are called to respect and foster that heritage as a unique and essential element of the identity of this country.

Of New Zealand Catholic diocesan clergy, 14% have been accused of improper behaviour (either fiscal, sexual abuse, psychological abuse or neglect) since 1950. There were 835 reported cases of alleged sexual child abuse since 1950. From the 1990s, cases of abuse within the Catholic Church and other child care institutions began to be exposed in New Zealand. There were "at least three priests" convicted and several were criticised for allowing abuse to continue. The abuse was on a much lower scale than in Australia and many other countries because the Catholic Church had "a less prominent role in education and social welfare". In 2000 the Church acknowledged and apologised for the abuse of children by clergy, putting in place protocols and setting up a national office to handle abuse complaints.

In 2001, the Pope transmitted an apology for injustices done to the indigenous peoples of Australia, New Zealand and the Pacific Islands, and asked for forgiveness where members of the church had been or still were party to such wrongs. The apostolic exhortation also condemned incidents of sexual abuse by clergy in Oceania.

== Demographics ==
In the 2013 census, 47.65 percent of the population identified themselves as Christians, while another 41.92 percent indicated that they had no religion and around 7 percent affiliated with other religions. The main Christian denominations are: Catholics (12.61 percent); Anglicans (11.79 percent), Presbyterians (8.47 percent), and Christians not further defined (5.54 percent). The 2013 census has shown an actual decline in Catholic adherents with a fall of some 16,000 members. However, the 2013 census also showed that the decline in the membership of the mainline non-Catholic denominations was greater, and that the Catholic Church had become the largest New Zealand Christian denomination, passing the Anglican Church for the first time in history. The percentage of Catholics in the 1901 census was 14 percent, though at that time the church was only the third largest denomination.

Regionally, the West Coast and Taranaki have the largest proportion of Catholics: 16.8 percent and 15.5 percent respectively at the 2013 census. Meanwhile, Tasman and Gisborne have the lowest proportion of Catholics at 7.4 percent and 8.2 percent respectively.

Approximately 25 percent of New Zealand Catholics regularly attend Sunday Mass compared to 60 percent in the late 1960s. In recent times numbers of priests, nuns and brothers have declined, and the involvement of laypeople has increased. There are 530 priests and 1,200 men and women religious. In 2024, there were 18 men training to be priests at Holy Cross Seminary.

== Social and political engagement ==
Catholic organisations in New Zealand are involved in community activities including education; health and care services; chaplaincy to prisons, rest homes, and hospitals; social justice and human rights advocacy. Catholic charities active in New Zealand include the St Vincent de Paul Society and Caritas Aotearoa New Zealand.

=== Education ===
The first Catholic School in New Zealand was opened in 1840, the year the Treaty of Waitangi was signed, at Kororareka, and was called St Peter's School. Initially Catholic missionaries, led by Bishop Pompallier, focused on schools for Māori. It was therefore Catholic laymen who in 1841 established a school for the sons of settlers. This school was Auckland's first school of any sort. In 1877, the new central government passed a secular Education Act and the Catholic Church decided to establish its own network of schools. The system expanded rapidly. However, by the early 1970s, the Catholic system was on the brink of financial collapse trying to keep up with the post-WWII baby boom, suburban expansion, extension of compulsory education from six to nine years, and smaller class sizes. In 1975, the Third Labour Government passed the Private Schools Conditional Integration Act, which allowed the financially strapped Catholic school system to integrate into the state system. This means the school could receive government funding and keep its Catholic character in exchange for having the obligations of a state-run school, such as teaching the state curriculum. The land and buildings continue to be owned by the local bishop or a religious order and are not government-funded; instead parents pay "attendance dues" for their upkeep. Between 1979 and 1984, all but one Catholic school integrated into the state system.

In June 2013, there were 190 Catholic primary schools in New Zealand and 50 secondary schools. Around 86,000 students were enrolled in 2015, or just under 10 percent of all students in the New Zealand school system. About 78 percent of New Zealand Catholic children attend Catholic schools. Academically, the schools do very well. Between 1994 and 2010, the rolls in Catholic schools increased by almost 22 percent. The New Zealand Catholic Education Office (NZCEO) assists in the running of Catholic schools in New Zealand.

=== Politics ===
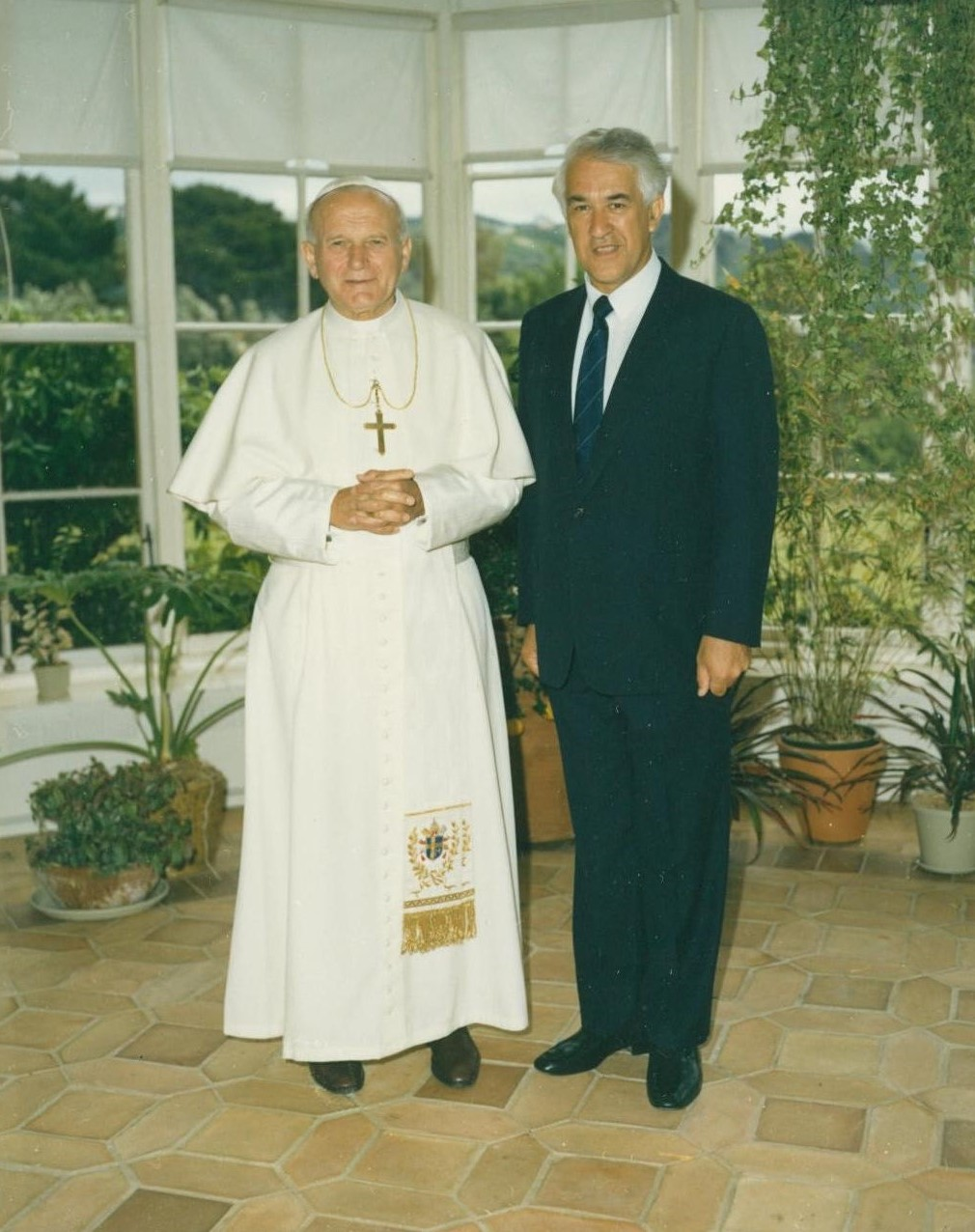
Pope John Paul II with Governor-General and former Anglican Archbishop of New Zealand Sir Paul Reeves in Wellington, November 1986

In 1853 Charles Clifford and his cousin Frederick Weld were elected members of the 1st New Zealand Parliament. Both were from old English Catholic recusant families, and were educated at Stonyhurst College. Clifford was chosen as the first speaker of the House in 1854. Weld was a government minister from 1860, premier from 1864, and was later appointed governor of several British colonies (Western Australia, Tasmania, and the Straits Settlements). Henry William Petre was a member of the Legislative Council from 1853 to 1860; his father William Petre, 11th Baron Petre was chairman of the New Zealand Company, and also from the old recusant Petre family.

In 1906 Liberal politician Joseph Ward, a Catholic, became prime minister. Ward was Australian-born and came from an Irish Catholic family. His political success was evidence that a Catholic could rise to the highest position in the land. New Zealand Catholics were strongly represented in early Labour politics, which shared their dislike for the Protestant Political Association and supported Irish Home Rule. In 1922, Bishop James Liston publicly rejoiced at Labour's electoral gains: "Thanks be to God, the Labour people, our friends, are coming into their own – a fair share in the Government of the country." In 1935, New Zealanders elected a Labour government led by another Catholic prime minister, Michael Joseph Savage. Later prime ministers Jim Bolger and Bill English were practising Catholics while serving in office.

In the later 20th century, many Catholics took up justice and peace causes in their own communities, as well as nationally and internationally. New Zealand Catholics led protests against apartheid during the Springbok tour of 1981.

Church leaders have often involved themselves in political issues in areas they consider relevant to Christian teachings. Recent political engagement by New Zealand bishops have included statements issued in relation to: the anti-nuclear movement; Māori rights and Treaty of Waitangi settlements; the rights of refugees and migrants; and promoting restorative justice over retributive justice in New Zealand.

In March 2013, Catholic bishops wrote to members of Parliament to state their strong objections to the Marriage (Definition of Marriage) Amendment Bill, which legalised same-sex marriage in New Zealand. The letter expressed concern that "state pressure will eventually be brought to bear against people’s freedom of conscience and speech."

== Dioceses and bishops ==
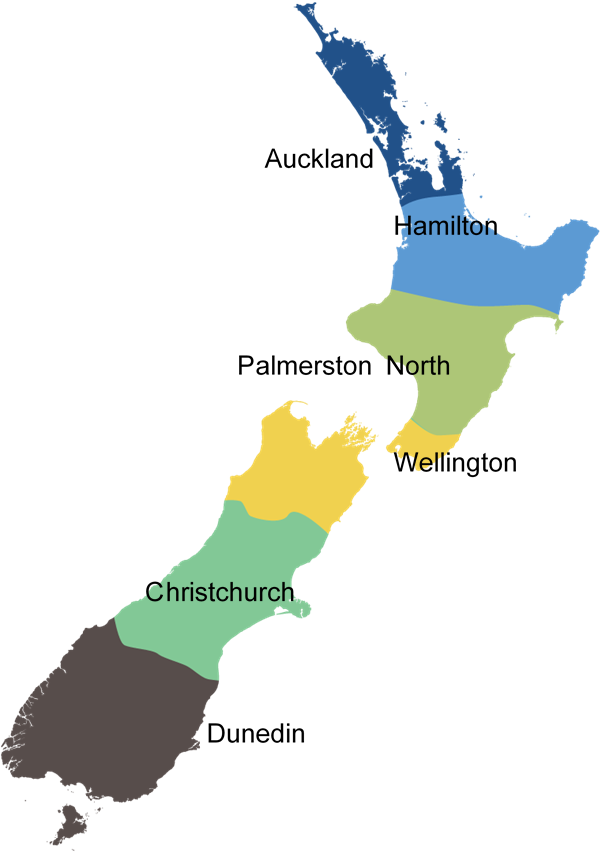
Map of Roman Catholic dioceses in New Zealand

There is one Roman Catholic metropolitan archdiocese and five suffragan dioceses in New Zealand.

Diocese	Approximate regions	Cathedral	Creation
Diocese of Auckland; Bishop of Auckland	Auckland, Northland	St Patrick's Cathedral	1848
Diocese of Christchurch; Bishop of Christchurch	Canterbury, West Coast	Cathedral of the Blessed Sacrament	1887
Diocese of Dunedin; Bishop of Dunedin	Otago, Southland	St Joseph's Cathedral	1869
Diocese of Hamilton; Bishop of Hamilton	Waikato, Bay of Plenty, Gisborne	Cathedral of the Blessed Virgin Mary	1980
Diocese of Palmerston North; Bishop of Palmerston North	Manawatū-Whanganui, Taranaki, Hawke's Bay	Cathedral of the Holy Spirit	1980
Archdiocese of Wellington; Archbishop of Wellington	Wellington, Marlborough, Nelson, Tasman, part of West Coast	Sacred Heart Cathedral	1848

=== Eastern Catholic eparchies having jurisdiction of New Zealand ===
New Zealand is also covered by four Eastern Catholic eparchies: the Melkite Eparchy of St. Michael the Archangel in Sydney, the Chaldean Eparchy of St. Thomas the Apostle of Sydney, the Ukrainian Eparchy of Sts. Peter and Paul of Melbourne and the Syro-Malabar Eparchy of St. Thomas the Apostle of Melbourne, all based out of Australia.

== See also ==
- Catholic Church by country
- Christianity in New Zealand
- List of Catholic bishops in New Zealand
- List of saints from Oceania
- Military Ordinariate of New Zealand
