= Diocese of Auckland =

Diocese of Auckland may refer to:

- Anglican Diocese of Auckland, a geographical area of the Anglican Church, in New Zealand
- Diocese of Auckland (Catholic), a geographical area of the Latin Church, in New Zealand

== See also ==
- Bishop Auckland, a town in England
