= Aquinas College, Tauranga =

Secondary school in Tauranga, New Zealand

Aquinas College

Location
- 183 Pyes Pa Road, Pyes Pa, Tauranga; 37.7519°S 176.1226°E

Information
- Type: Catholic co-educational collegiate and intermediate (year 7–13)
- Motto: Kia mau ki te pono "Hold Fast to Truth"
- Religious affiliation: Catholic
- Established: 2003; 23 years ago
- Ministry of Education Institution no.: 482
- Principal: Matthew Dalton (2018– )
- Grades: 7–13
- Gender: Co-ed
- Enrolment: 840 (July 2026)
- Campus type: Rural
- Colors: Sherwood Green; Navy Blue
- Athletics conference: Western BOP
- Nickname: Aquinians
- Socio-economic decile: 9P
- Newspaper: Aquinas College Term Newsletter
- Yearbook: Aquinas College Yearbook
- Alumni name: Auld Aquinians
- Website: aquinas.school.nz

Aquinas College is a Roman Catholic co-educational school that combines intermediate and college (years 7–13) in Tauranga, New Zealand. It was founded in 2003 with St. Thomas Aquinas as its patron saint. The proprietor of the school, which is a state-integrated school, is the Bishop of Hamilton. The school's founding principal was Brendon Schollum (2003–2010).

== Principals ==
- Brendon Schollum: 2003–2010
- Ray Scott: 2010–2017
- Matthew Dalton: 2018–present

== House system ==
The school has four houses. They are:

- Browne (purple)
- Cluny (blue)
- Foy (gold)
- Hēni Pore (red)

Each house is represented by a different colour (as seen above). Each represents a well-known Catholic figure or group. These are prominent individuals in the Catholic church who have demonstrated the school's touchstones throughout their lives. Browne House is named after Bishop Denis Browne, Hēni Pore House is named after Hēni Pore Karamu, Cluny House is named after The Cluny Sisters, and Foy House is named after Father Pat Foy. Each house is split into seven tutor classes (one for each year level), with one tutor class unique from this custom, "Manukura", which combines all year levels and celebrates Māori and kapa haka.

A house championship is fiercely contested for throughout the school year, with several annual events for students to gain points for their house. These events consist of schoolwide athletics day, swimming sports, cross country, sing/dance competition and haka/waiata competition. Students compete to earn points for their house by participation or placing in these events. A house championship winner is announced at the end of the school year; house leaders are awarded the coveted 'Interhouse Cup' for earning the most points.

== Sport ==
Aquinas fields numerous teams across a wide range of sports, with many teams and individuals representing the College regionally and nationally, including:

- Air pistol shooting
- Badminton
- Basketball
- Cricket
- Cross country
- Football
- Golf
- Gymnastics
- Hockey
- Multi-sports
- Netball
- Rippa
- Rock climbing
- Rowing
- Rugby
- Sailing
- Snow sports
- Squash
- Surf lifesaving
- Swimming
- Tennis
- Touch
- Track running
- Volleyball
- Water polo
- Windsurfing

== Curriculum ==
NCEA levels 1, 2 and 3 are offered for years ten to thirteen. An accelerate year 10 class in the subjects of science and math undergo NCEA level 1 work similar to year 11 students. Religious Education is compulsory as a subject for all students.

== Touchstones ==
Aquinas College has six touchstones, which are values shown by students, staff and the wider college community: Family, Scholarship, Service, Truth, Prayer, and Joy.

The school's 'Touchstone Award' is awarded to a Year 13 student who displays the school's touchstones at the end of the school year.

== Notable alumni ==
- Eliana Hulsebosch (born 2007) - downhill mountain biker
- Adam Ling (born 1991) – rower; won a gold medal at the 2015 World Rowing Championships in the lightweight single sculls.
- Justin Sangster (born 1996) – professional rugby union player.

== See also ==
- Aquinas College Website
- List of schools in New Zealand
- Roman Catholic Diocese of Hamilton in New Zealand
