= Lewis Marshall =

- Born: 29 August 1988 (age 38) Wainuiomata, New Zealand
- Height: 1.87 m (6 ft 2 in)
- Weight: 94 kg (207 lb)
- School: Hato Paora College

Rugby union career
- Position: Utility back
Amateur team(s)
Years	Team	Apps	(Points)
2010–12, 17–	Feilding Old Boys-Oroua		
2013	Freyberg		
2014	Petone (Wellington)		
2015–16	MAC Sports		
Provincial / State sides
Years	Team	Apps	(Points)
2010–13, 17; 2015–16	Manawatu	36	(58)
-	Hawke's Bay	8	(5)
- Correct as of 16 October 2017

Lewis Marshall (born 29 August 1988) is a New Zealand rugby union player who currently plays for Manawatu in the Mitre 10 Cup. His preferred position is fullback, though he is a versatile backline player.

Although from Wainuiomata, Marshall attended Hato Paora College, in Feilding.

Marshall did not start playing rugby union until his first year of Secondary education. He initially played rugby league.

He started his provincial career with Manawatu, making his debut in 2010.

In 2015, Marshall was forced to move away from the Manawatu to Hawke's Bay after his partner received a teaching job. Marshall himself then got a job as a teacher aide.

== Family ==
Marshall and his partner, Tammy, have a 19-month old son.
