= Hato Pāora College =

Location
- 1314 Kimbolton Road, R D 7, Feilding, New Zealand; 40.1511°S 175.6601°E

Information
- Type: Integrated boys' secondary, years 9–13
- Motto: Whāia te Tika; To Pursue What is Right
- Established: 1947; 79 years ago
- Ministry of Education Institution no.: 199
- Principal: Wiremu Paniora (acting)
- Enrolment: 113 (July 2026)
- Socio-economic decile: 4J
- Website: www.hatopaora.school.nz

Hato Pāora College is a Catholic, Māori Boys' Boarding school located near Cheltenham, Feilding, New Zealand. It was founded in 1947 under the leadership of Marist Priest, Isaac J Gupwell. It is the largest Boys' Maori Boarding Secondary School in New Zealand.

== Notable alumni ==
- Aroha Awarau, journalist, editor, playwright
- Otere Black, professional rugby union player
- Nikora Broughton, professional rugby union player
- Morvin Edwards, former New Zealand Kiwi Rugby League Player,
- Max Takuira Matthew Mariu SM (1952–2005), Auxiliary Bishop of Hamilton (1988–2005), first Māori Catholic bishop.
- Lewis Marshall, professional rugby union player
- Rangi Mātāmua, indigenous studies and Māori cultural astronomy academic; Professor of Mātauranga Māori; New Zealander of the Year 2023
- Shannon Paku, professional rugby union player
- Kade Poki, professional rugby union player
- Morvin Simon, composer and kapa haka expert
- Archie John Te Atawhai Taiaroa KNZM (3 January 1937 – 21 September 2010), Māori leader
