= Max Mariu =

New Zealand Roman Catholic bishop (1952–2005)

The Most Reverend Max Mariu CNZM
- Auxiliary Bishop
- Church: Catholic Church
- Archdiocese: Wellington
- Diocese: Hamilton

Orders
- Ordination: 30 April 1977 by Edward Gaines
- Consecration: 19 May 1988 by Edward Gaines

Personal details
- Born: 12 August 1952 Waihi Village, New Zealand
- Died: 12 December 2005 (aged 53) Auckland, New Zealand
- Education: Hato Paora College; Marist Seminary

Max Takuira Matthew Mariu CNZM (12 August 1952 – 12 December 2005) was the Auxiliary Bishop of Hamilton, New Zealand (1988–2005). He was the first Māori to be ordained a Catholic bishop.

== Early life ==
Mariu was born in Taumarunui in 1952 and his iwi was Ngāti Tūwharetoa. He attended the Sisters of St Joseph convent school in Waihi Village and received his secondary education at Hato Paora College, Feilding.

== Religious life ==
Mariu joined the Society of Mary and studied for the priesthood at Mt St Mary's Seminary, Greenmeadows. He spent time at the Marist novitiate at Highden in 1972.

=== Ordained ministry ===
Mariu was ordained to the priesthood on 30 April 1977 by Bishop Edward Gaines, Auxiliary Bishop of Auckland. He did parish work in Napier and Whangārei and in Māori pastoral care at Pakipaki where he was superior of the Marist community. For three years he was on the staff of Hato Paora College (1980–1982).

==== Episcopacy ====
Beginning in 1981, Te Hahi Katorika ki Aotearoa, the national Catholic Māori body, supported by the New Zealand Catholic Bishops' Conference, lobbied for seven years for a Māori bishop. Despite their preference for a personal prelature with specific responsibility for Māori, Mariu was appointed as Auxiliary Bishop of Hamilton by Pope John Paul II on 30 January 1988 and was ordained a bishop on 19 May 1988 by Edward Gaines, who had become Bishop of Hamilton, as principal consecrator, and with Cardinal Williams and Bishop Finau SM of Roman Catholic Diocese of Tonga as co-consecrators. The ordination was a great ceremony combining Māori and Catholic ritual on the Catholic marae Te Papa o Te Aroha in Tokoroa in the presence of 1,500 people.

Mariu was the first Māori to be ordained a Catholic bishop. Later in 1988, Bishop Mariu and Bishop Gaines made their Ad Limina visit to Rome and met Pope John Paul II. The Pope referred to Mariu as the Bambino Bishop because of his relative youth. In 2001 Te Runanga o te Hahi Katorika requested the establishment of a Catholic Māori Diocese and the appointment of a Māori ordinary. This has not yet come about. On the death of Bishop Gaines on 6 September 1994, Mariu was named Diocesan Administrator while the process of selecting a new ordinary was begun. He administered the Diocese until Bishop Browne, until then Bishop of Auckland, was installed as Bishop of Hamilton on 27 March 1995. Mariu usually resided in Tokoroa after becoming bishop.

In the 2002 New Year Honours, Mariu was appointed a Companion of the New Zealand Order of Merit, for services to Māori and the community.

== Writer ==
Mariu was a biographer of Wiremu Te Awhitu SM (1914–1994), the first Māori to be ordained a Catholic priest.

== Death ==
Mariu died in Auckland on 12 December 2005 at the age of 53, having suffered from coronary problems for some years, beginning when he was in training at Greenmeadows seminary. He was taken to Turangawaewae Marae in Ngāruawāhia at the request of Te Arikinui Dame Te Atairangikaahu, then to Hamilton's Catholic Cathedral of the Blessed Virgin Mary, where his body lay.

His body then lay at his home marae at Waihi Village, where he had been baptised 53 years earlier. On 15 December Bishop Browne, with eight other bishops including Bishop Stuart O'Connell SM of Rarotonga, celebrated his official Requiem Mass in the Hamilton Cathedral. After another Requiem Mass at Waihi Village, Mariu was buried on 16 December 2005 in the urupā at his family kāinga (settlement), Otukou, on the shores of Lake Rotoaira.

== Notes ==
Catholic Church titles
| Preceded by – | Auxiliary Bishop of Hamilton; 1988–2005 | Succeeded by – |
