= Richard Laurenson =

Bishop of the roman-catholic church

The Most Reverend Richard Laurenson
- 4th Bishop of Hamilton
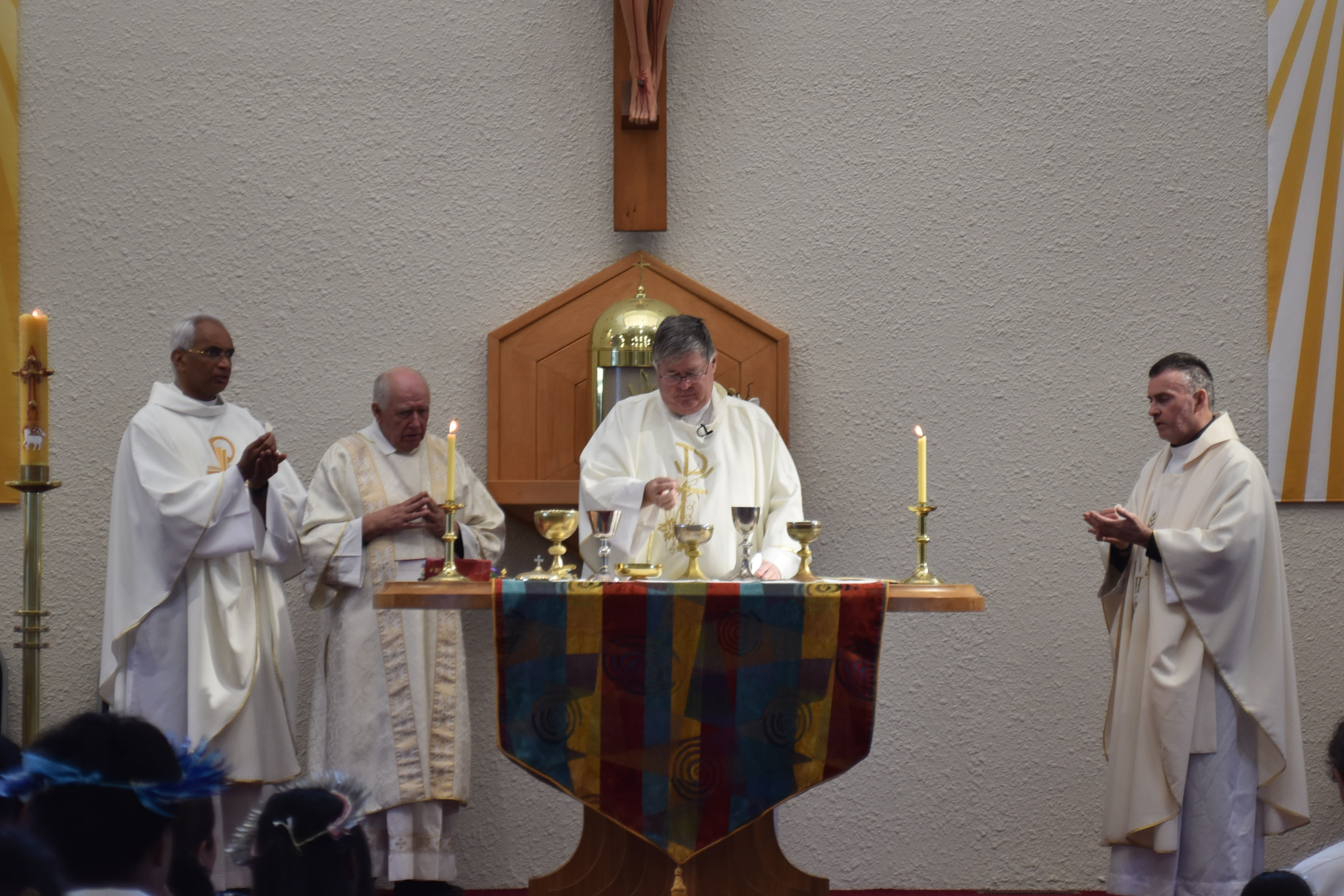
- Laurenson in 2026
- Archdiocese: Archdiocese of Wellington
- Diocese: Roman Catholic Diocese of Hamilton, New Zealand
- Appointed: 25 October 2023
- Predecessor: Stephen Lowe

Orders
- Ordination: 12 July 1995 by Denis Browne
- Consecration: 8 December 2023 by Stephen Lowe

Personal details
- Born: Richard Philip James Laurenson; 4 July 1969 (age 57) Hamilton, New Zealand
- Coat of arms

Richard Philip James Laurenson (born 4 July 1968) is a New Zealand priest of the Catholic Church who has served as the fourth bishop of the Diocese of Hamilton since 8 December 2023. Prior to his appointment as bishop, he served as a parish pastor and canon lawyer for the diocese.

== Biography ==
Laurenson was born on 4 July 1968 in Hamilton, and attended Holy Cross Major Seminary before being ordained a priest for the Diocese of Hamilton on 12 July 1995. Following his ordination he served as vicar at St. Mary in Rotorua as well as a chaplain to peacekeeping forces in the Bougainville conflict. He earned his licentiate in canon law from the Pontifical Urban University in 2010, and served as diocesan administrator following the resignation of Denis Browne. He also was the only Catholic chaplain serving the New Zealand Reserve Force on the North Island.

At the time of his appointment as bishop, Laurenson was serving as diocesan chancellor as well as pastor of All Saints By the Sea at Papamoa.

He was consecrated bishop on December 8, 2023, in the Cathedral of the Blessed Virgin Mary by bishop Stephen Lowe of Auckland.

Catholic Church titles
Preceded by Stephen Lowe	4th Bishop of Hamilton; 2023–present	Succeeded by incumbent
