= Henry Cleary =

Roman Catholic bishop in New Zealand

Henry Cleary OBE
- Bishop of Auckland
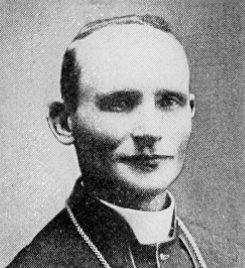
- Church: Catholic Church
- Diocese: Diocese of Auckland
- In office: 23 June 1910 – 9 December 1929
- Predecessor: George Lenihan
- Successor: James Liston

Orders
- Ordination: 11 January 1885
- Consecration: 21 August 1910 by Abraham Brownrigg

Personal details
- Born: Henry William Cleary; 15 January 1859 Glenranny (near Ballyedmond), County Wexford, United Kingdom of Great Britain and Ireland
- Died: 9 December 1929 (aged 70) Auckland, Dominion of New Zealand, British Empire
- Education: St Peter's College, Wexford; St Patrick's College, Maynooth

Henry William Cleary OBE (15 January 1859 – 9 December 1929) was the sixth Roman Catholic Bishop of Auckland, from 1910 to 1929.

== Life ==
Henry Cleary was born in County Wexford, Ireland. He was educated at St. Aidan's Academy, Enniscorthy, St Peter's College, Wexford and St. Patrick's College, Maynooth. He attended the Roman Seminary and the seminary of St. Sulpice in Paris. Cleary was ordained in 1885.

From 1885 to 1888, Cleary was a professor of modern languages at St. Peter's, and a member of the Society of Volunteer Diocesan Missionaries of the Blessed Sacrament. In 1888, he went to Australia due to poor health, and from 1888 to 1897 was involved in parish work at Ballarat, Victoria. From 1898 to 1910, he served as the editor of the New Zealand Tablet.

Cleary was appointed Bishop of Auckland in 1910. He was very active in the Australian Catholic Truth Society, and in ministering to the Maori people in their own language. He was author of numerous pamphlets and brochures, and a contributor to various newspapers, periodicals, and the Catholic Encyclopedia.

In the 1919 King's Birthday Honours, Cleary was appointed an Officer of the Order of the British Empire. He died in Auckland on 9 December 1929.

== Selected works ==
- Orange Society, Catholic Truth Society, London, 1899.
- Mrs. Slattery: the romance of sham nun , NZ Tablet, Dunedin, 1900.
- Joseph Slattery: the romance of an unfrocked priest, NZ Tablet, Dunedin, 1900.
- Catholic marriages: the decree of 2 August 1907: a popular explanation of the decree, the text of a controversy on the decree in the Christchurch "Press", 3 March to 2 April 1908 (with notes and comments) and, an exposition of the Catholic teaching in Dunedin, N.Z., N Z Tablet, 1908.
- Impeached nation: being a study of Irish outrages, NZ Tablet, Dunedin, 1909.
- God or no-God in the school?: a pastoral letter by … the Bishop of Auckland, a discussion thereon in the Evening Post, Wellington (N.Z.), and a critical examination of the discussion, Hiscocks & Sons, Auckland, 1911.
- Bible-in-schools- movement, in its relation to taxpayers, parents, teachers and pupils: a lecture / delivered in the Town Hall, Wellington Friday, 13 December 1912, Evening Post Office, Wellington, 1912.
- Prussian militarism at work: a letter, Barclay & Fry, London, 1917.
- 'The Month': a journal devoted to Catholic interests (Cleary was founding editor from 1918–29; journal ceased in 1934).
- Catholics and the marriage laws, Catholic Supplies, Wellington, 1920.
- Forged murder-"oaths": an exposure of impostures flung against the Catholic clergy and laity, in the New Zealand House of Representatives, on 26 June 1923, by Mr. V.H. Potter MP: a reprint of articles in "The Month" (Auckland, N.Z.) by the Rt. Rev, The Catholic Depot, Auckland, 1923.
- Catholic Church and party politics: Canon James's charge of votes-jobbery: letter to the Anglican Archbishop and Primate, Whitcombe & Tombs, Auckland, 1928.

== Sources ==
- E.R. Simmons, A Brief History of the Catholic Church in New Zealand, Catholic Publication Centre, Auckland, 1978.
- E.R. Simmons, In Cruce Salus, A History of the Diocese of Auckland 1848 – 1980, Catholic Publication Centre, Auckland 1982.
- Bishop Henry William Cleary, Catholic Hierarchy website (retrieved 12 February 2011)
- Wade, Amelia (25 April 2012). "Bishop's courage under fire in France". The New Zealand Herald.

Catholic Church titles
Preceded by George Lenihan	sixth Roman Catholic Bishop of Auckland; 1910–1929	Succeeded by James Liston
