= Stephen Lowe (bishop of Auckland) =

New Zealand prelate

His Excellency, The Most Reverend Stephen Lowe
- 12th Bishop of Auckland
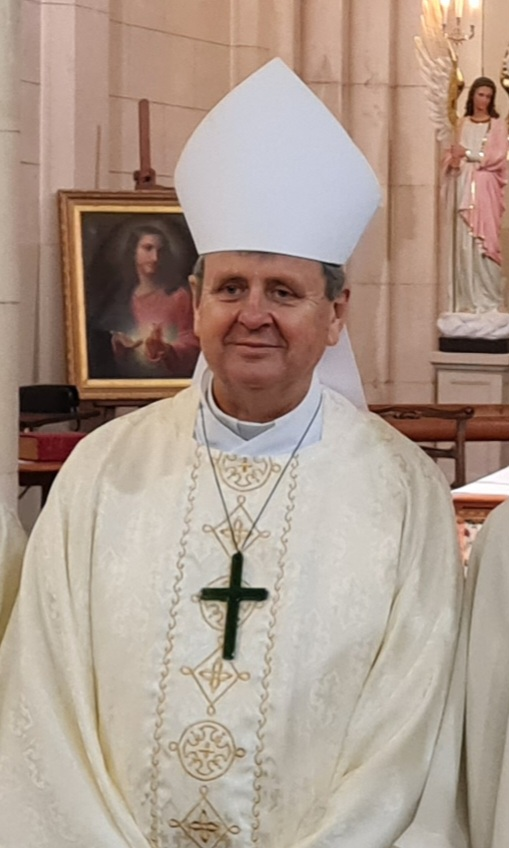
- Lowe in 2024
- Archdiocese: Archdiocese of Wellington
- Diocese: Roman Catholic Diocese of Auckland
- Installed: 17 December 2021
- Predecessor: Patrick Dunn
- Previous post: Bishop of Hamilton (2015-2021)

Orders
- Ordination: 7 June 1996
- Consecration: 13 February 2015 by Denis Browne

Personal details
- Born: Stephen Marmion Lowe; 3 August 1962 (age 64) Hokitika, New Zealand
- Denomination: Roman Catholic Church
- Occupation: Roman Catholic bishop
- Profession: Cleric
- Education: Holy Cross Seminary, Mosgiel, New Zealand; Pontifical Gregorian University, Rome; St. Charles Borromeo Seminary, Philadelphia
- Motto: The Lord is my Shepherd
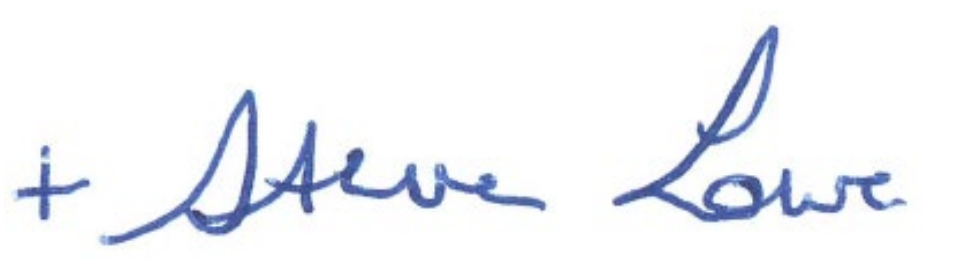
- Signature: Stephen Lowe's signature

Ordination history of Stephen Lowe
History
Episcopal consecration
- Principal consecrator: Denis Browne
- Co-consecrators: Barry Jones; Charles Drennan

Styles of Stephen Marmion Lowe
- Reference style: The Most Reverend
- Spoken style: Your Excellency
- Religious style: Bishop

Stephen Marmion Lowe (born 3 August 1962) is a New Zealand prelate of the Roman Catholic Church. On 18 December 2021, Pope Francis appointed him as the twelfth Bishop of Auckland, succeeding Bishop Patrick Dunn. From 2015 until his Auckland appointment, he was the Bishop of Hamilton, New Zealand.

== Early life and education ==
Lowe was born in Hokitika, the youngest child of Milly and Frank Lowe, with two older sisters Margaret and Dorothy. He was educated at Hokitika Primary School, then St Mary's Primary School, Hokitika. He undertook his secondary studies at Westland High School.

Following school he worked for the NZ Forest Service in Hokitika and Christchurch and the NZ Timberlands in Timaru. During this time he became involved in his local parish in Timaru North where he was involved in a young adults group and with youth in the parish. In 1989 he discerned the call to priesthood. He attended Holy Cross College in Mosgiel and then the St. Charles Borromeo Seminary, Philadelphia, Pennsylvania (United States).

== Ordained ministry ==
Lowe was ordained a priest on 7 June 1996, in Hokitika for the Diocese of Christchurch and served as the assistant priest in Mairehau, Ashburton and Greymouth parishes before being appointed parish priest of Timaru North and Chaplain of Roncalli College in 2000. During the years 2005–2007 he completed a Licenciate in Spiritual Theology in Rome at the Pontifical Gregorian University.

From 2008 until October 2014, Lowe was the director of formation at the National Seminary, Holy Cross College in Ponsonby, Auckland. While based at the seminary in Auckland, he served, for a time, as Parish Priest of Ponsonby.

== Episcopal ministry ==
=== Bishop of Hamilton ===
On 22 November 2014, Lowe was appointed by Pope Francis to replace Denis Browne, the 2nd Bishop of Hamiton, whose resignation was accepted on the same date. His consecration as a bishop took place at the Cathedral of the Blessed Virgin Mary, Hamilton, on 13 February 2015. His principal consecrator was his predecessor, Denis Browne. The principal co-consecrators were Bishop Barry Jones of Christchurch and Bishop Charles Drennan of Palmerston North.

In 2021, Lowe was the Vice President and Secretary of the NZ Catholic Bishops Conference, and the bishops’ representative on Te Rūnanga o te Hāhi Katorika ō Aotearoa, the Church’s national Māori advisory group. He was also a member of several other bodies including the National Safeguarding and Professional Standards Committee.

=== Bishop of Auckland ===
Lowe was appointed as the twelfth Bishop of Auckland on 17 December 2021, and installed on 19 February 2022. Lowe is the Grand Prior of the New Zealand Lieutenancy of the Equestrian Order of the Holy Sepulchre of Jerusalem.

Catholic Church titles
Preceded by Patrick Dunn	Bishop of Auckland; 2021–present	Succeeded by Incumbent
Preceded by Denis Browne	Bishop of Hamilton; 2015–2021	Succeeded by Richard Laurenson
