= Diocese of Hamilton, New Zealand =

Roman Catholic diocese in New Zealand

Coordinates: 37°47′S 175°17′E

Diocese of Hamilton Dioecesis Hamiltonensis

Location
- Country: New Zealand
- Territory: New Zealand
- Ecclesiastical province: Wellington

Statistics
- Area: 49,700 km^{2} (19,200 sq mi)
- Population: Total; Catholics: (as of 2022); 774,900; 65,500 (8.5%)
- Parishes: 33

Information
- Denomination: Catholic Church
- Sui iuris church: Latin Church
- Rite: Roman Rite
- Established: 6 March 1980
- Cathedral: Cathedral of the Blessed Virgin Mary

Current leadership
- Pope: Leo XIV
- Bishop: Richard Laurenson

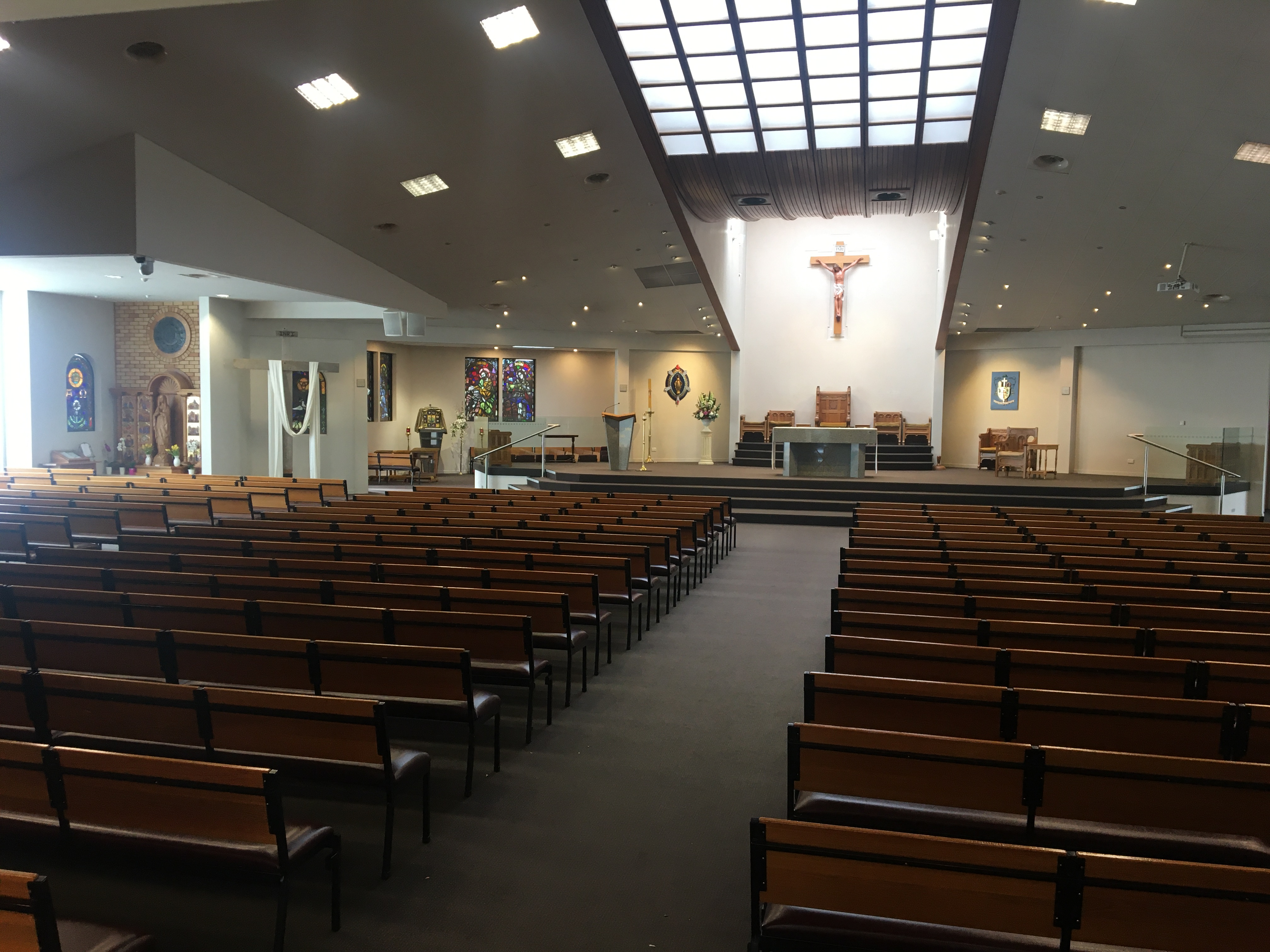
Interior view of the Cathedral of the Blessed Virgin Mary in the Diocese of Hamilton, New Zealand

The Latin Church Catholic Diocese of Hamilton, New Zealand (Latin: Dioecesis Hamiltonen(sis)) is a suffragan diocese of the Roman Catholic Archdiocese of Wellington. It is centred in Hamilton, New Zealand and was formed on 6 March 1980 from a portion of the territory in the Diocese of Auckland. The Cathedral of the Diocese is the Cathedral of the Blessed Virgin Mary.

== Ordinaries of Hamilton, New Zealand ==
Tenure	Incumbent	Life
1980 to 1994	Edward Russell Gaines	1926 to 1994
1994 to 2014	Denis Browne	1937 to 2024
2015 to 2021	Stephen Lowe	1962 to present
2021 to 2023	Stephen Lowe, Apostolic Administrator
2023 to present	Richard Laurenson	1969 to present

== Other Bishops ==
=== Auxiliary bishop ===
Max Takuira Matthew Mariu SM (1952-2005), Auxiliary Bishop here (1988-2005)

=== Other priest of this diocese who became bishop ===
Michael Andrew Gielen (1971-), priest here (1997-2020); Auxiliary Bishop of Auckland (2020 - 2022); Bishop of Christchurch (2022–present)

== Secondary schools ==
- Aquinas College, Tauranga
- Campion College, Gisborne
- John Paul College, Rotorua
- Sacred Heart Girls' College, Hamilton
- St John's College, Hamilton

== See also ==
- Holy Cross Seminary
- Holy Name Seminary
- Roman Catholicism in New Zealand
- List of New Zealand Catholic bishops

== External links and references ==
- Catholic Diocese of Hamilton in New Zealand
- "Diocese of Hamilton in New Zealand". Catholic-Hierarchy.
