= Patrick Dunn (bishop) =

Anglo-New Zealand Catholic bishop (born 1950)

The Most Reverend Patrick Dunn
- Bishop Emeritus of Auckland
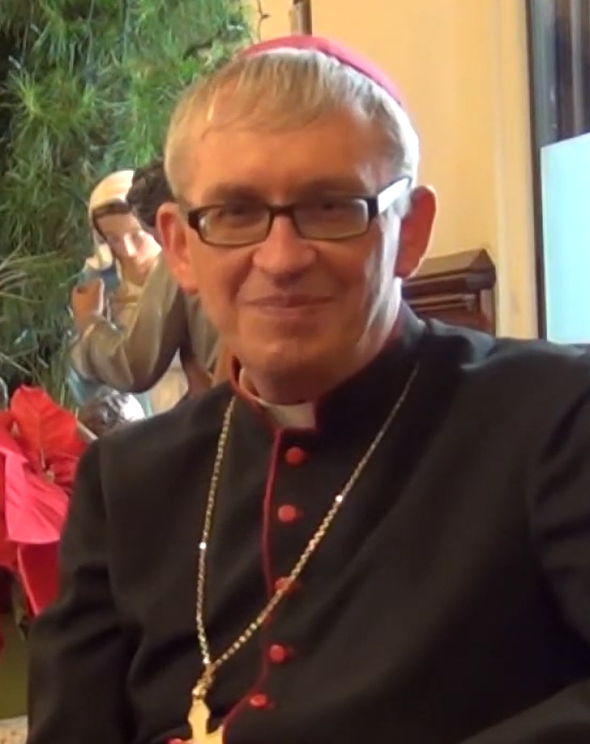
- Bishop Dunn in 2011
- Church: Roman Catholic Church
- Diocese: Auckland
- See: Auckland
- Appointed: 19 December 1994
- Installed: 29 March 1995
- Predecessor: Denis George Browne
- Successor: Stephen Lowe
- Other post: President of the New Zealand Episcopal Conference (2016-)
- Previous posts: Titular Bishop of Fesseë (1994); Auxiliary Bishop of Auckland (1994); Secretary General of the New Zealand Episcopal Conference (2012-16)

Orders
- Ordination: 24 April 1976 by John Mackey
- Consecration: 25 July 1994 by Denis George Browne

Personal details
- Born: 5 February 1950 (age 76) Muswell Hill, London, England, United Kingdom
- Education: Sacred Heart College
- Alma mater: University of Auckland; Holy Cross College; Melbourne College of Divinity
- Motto: Be Not Afraid

- Coat of arms

Patrick James Dunn (born 5 February 1950) is a Catholic prelate. He was the 11th Bishop of Auckland, New Zealand from 1994 to 2021.

== Early life ==
Dunn was born in London and is the eldest son of the late H. P. ("Pat") Dunn, a prominent Auckland obstetrician. Dunn was considerably influenced by his father and his mother, June Dunn, a former school teacher, in later deciding to become a priest and being appointed a bishop. He was educated at St Michael's School, Remuera, Sacred Heart College, Auckland, from 1961 to 1967, and the University of Auckland in 1968. He studied for the Catholic priesthood under the Jesuits at Holy Name Seminary, Christchurch from 1969 to 1970, and under the Vincentians at Holy Cross College, Mosgiel from 1971 to 1976. Beginning in 1988 he studied for a master's degree in theology from the Melbourne College of Divinity, which resulted in the publication of his study: Priesthood: a re-examination of the Roman Catholic theology of the presbyterate.

== Priest ==
Dunn was ordained a priest at St Michael's Church in Remuera on 24 April 1976. He then carried out pastoral work with Māori in Māngere East and lived at the Auckland Catholic marae Te Unga Waka Marae in Epsom. Later, he served in the Auckland suburbs of Takapuna, Pakuranga and Northcote. In 1986 and 1987 he was Director of Vocations for the Diocese of Auckland. In 1992 he was appointed pastoral assistant to the Bishop of Auckland Denis Browne.

== Bishop ==
On 24 July 1994, Dunn was ordained to the episcopate as an auxiliary bishop of Auckland.

On 24 December 1994 he was appointed Bishop of Auckland to succeed Browne who had been named Bishop of Hamilton. Dunn was installed as Bishop of Auckland in St Patrick's Cathedral, Auckland, on 29 March 1995.

In 2015, Dunn expressed dissatisfaction with the English version of the Mass in use since November 2011. Dunn had served as New Zealand's representative on the International Commission on English in the Liturgy (ICEL), which had produced a translation of the Roman Missal in 1998 after 17 years of effort. The Congregation for Divine Worship had rejected that translation, formed its own committee, and produced the translation now in use. Dunn wrote that it was "too often unclear and sometimes verging on the unintelligible", "an accurate English translation of the Latin, but not a clear and beautiful vernacular text". He proposed a new translation be undertaken and has suggested that all the English-speaking bishops' conferences agree to pursue this in concert. New Zealand's bishops first endorsed instead efforts to establish different guidelines for translation rather than a new translation, and in 2017 welcomed Pope Francis' establishment of a commission to review the standards followed in rejecting the 1998 translation. Dunn said the idea was to avoid rules that "impose Latin syntax on contemporary English".

In September 2017, Dunn authored an essay in NZ Catholic on the relationship of the Church to LGBT Catholics. He said that communication comes before judgment and instruction: "For Jesus it was most often friendship first, and conversion second. We all listen most intently to those we love and those whose company we enjoy." He recommended the work of Jesuit James Martin as a guide, advocating its inclusive language and sensitivity. He wrote that an attitude of respect requires the Church to call people by the terms they prefer rather than homosexual and called the Vatican's use of the phrase objectively disordered "needlessly cruel".

In 2018, Dunn was the secretary of the New Zealand Catholic Bishops Conference and the episcopal deputy for Holy Cross Seminary and Good Shepherd College.

== Resignation ==
Dunn's resignation as Bishop of Auckland was announced on 17 December 2021 as was the appointment of Stephen Lowe (hitherto Bishop of Hamilton) as his successor.

== Notes ==
Catholic Church titles
Preceded by Denis Browne	Bishop of Auckland; 1994–2021	Succeeded by Stephen Lowe
Preceded by -	Auxiliary Bishop of Auckland; 1994	Succeeded by -
