= George Lenihan =

Roman Catholic Bishop

The Right Reverend George Lenihan
- Bishop of Auckland
- Church: Catholic Church
- Diocese: Diocese of Auckland
- In office: 18 June 1896 – February 1910
- Predecessor: John Luck
- Successor: Henry Cleary

Orders
- Ordination: 27 August 1882 by John Luck
- Consecration: 15 November 1896 by John Grimes

Personal details
- Born: George Michael Lenihan; 11 September 1858 London, United Kingdom of Great Britain and Ireland
- Died: 1910 (aged 51–52)

Rt. Rev. George Michael Lenihan OSB (11 September 1858 – 10 February 1910) was fifth Catholic Bishop of Auckland (1896–1910).

== Early life ==
Lenihan was born in 1858 in London. His post-secondary education was completed at St Edmund's College, Ware and English College. Lenihan "was the first student of the Ramsgate College to be ordained to the secular priesthood" during 1882.

== Priesthood in Auckland ==
During the late 1800s, Lenihan started his religious career at St Patrick's Cathedral, Auckland and Ponsonby, He then went to the Star of the Sea Orphanage before becoming the "irremovable rector" in Parnell.

== Bishop of Auckland ==
In the 1890s, Lenihan was a Coadjutor bishop. His bishop tenure started after he succeeded Bishop Luck. Bishop Lenihan died on 23 February 1910.

== Sources ==
- E.R. Simmons, A Brief History of the Catholic Church in New Zealand, Catholic Publication Centre, Auckland, 1978.
- E.R. Simmons, In Cruce Salus, A History of the Diocese of Auckland 1848 - 1980, Catholic Publication Centre, Auckland 1982.

Catholic Church titles
Preceded by John Luck OSB	5th Bishop of Auckland; 1896-1910	Succeeded by Henry Cleary
