= John Luck =

John Luck OSB
- Bishop of Auckland
- Church: Catholic Church
- Diocese: Diocese of Auckland
- In office: 14 July 1882 – 23 January 1896
- Predecessor: Walter Steins Bisschop
- Successor: George Lenihan

Orders
- Ordination: 1865
- Consecration: 13 August 1882 by Henry Edward Manning

Personal details
- Born: John Edmund Luck; 1840 Peckham, London, United Kingdom of Great Britain and Ireland
- Died: 1896 (aged 55–56)

John Edmund Luck (1840–1896) OSB was the fourth Catholic bishop of Auckland, New Zealand (1882–1896). He was born in England.

Luck was stationed in St Augustine's Abbey, Ramsgate before becoming the Bishop of Auckland in August 1882.

Luck Crescent in Monte Cecilia Park, Hillsborough, Auckland was named in his honour in 1982.

== References or sources ==
- E.R. Simmons, A Brief History of the Catholic Church in New Zealand, Catholic Publication Centre, Auckland, 1978.
- E.R. Simmons, In Cruce Salus, A History of the Diocese of Auckland 1848 – 1980, Catholic Publication Centre, Auckland 1982.
- Bishop John Edmund Luck OSB, Catholic Hierarchy website (retrieved 12 February 2011)

Catholic Church titles
Preceded by Walter Steins SJ	4th Bishop of Auckland; 1882-1896	Succeeded by George Lenihan OSB
