= Cathedral of the Blessed Virgin Mary, Hamilton =

Cathedral of the Blessed Virgin Mary
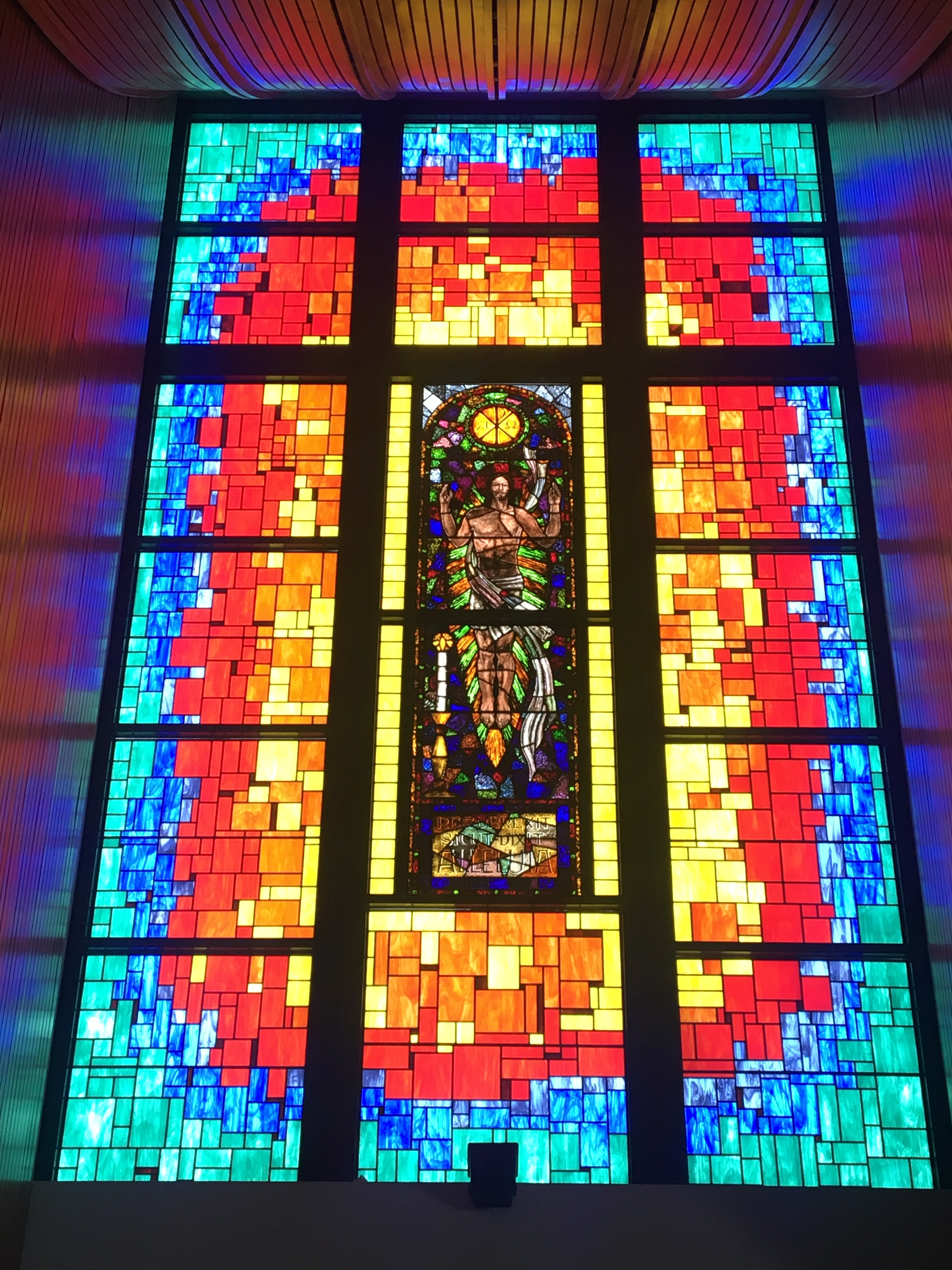
- Location: 494 Grey Street, Hamilton East 3216
- Country: New Zealand
- Denomination: Roman Catholic
- Website: Cathedral of the Blessed Virgin Mary

History
- Former name: St Mary's Church
- Founded: 1911-1912
- Dedication: Blessed Virgin Mary
- Dedicated: 1980, 2008

Architecture
- Groundbreaking: 1911
- Completed: 1975, 2008

Administration
- Diocese: Hamilton
- Parish: Cathedral of the Blessed Virgin Mary

Clergy
- Bishop: Bishop Richard Laurenson
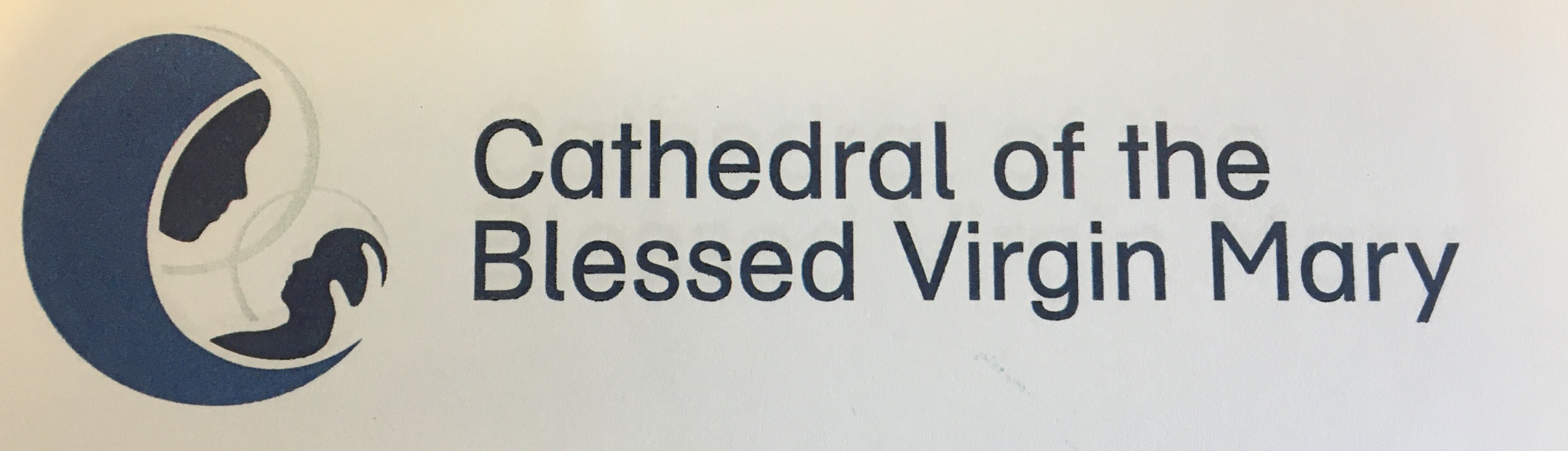

The Cathedral of the Blessed Virgin Mary is the cathedral of the Roman Catholic Diocese of Hamilton, New Zealand. It was opened in 1975, replacing an earlier Neo-Classical building known as St Mary's Church which was built in 1911–1912. The Cathedral of the Blessed Virgin Mary was dedicated and renamed on 27 April 1980 and rededicated, following refurbishment, on 7 November 2008.

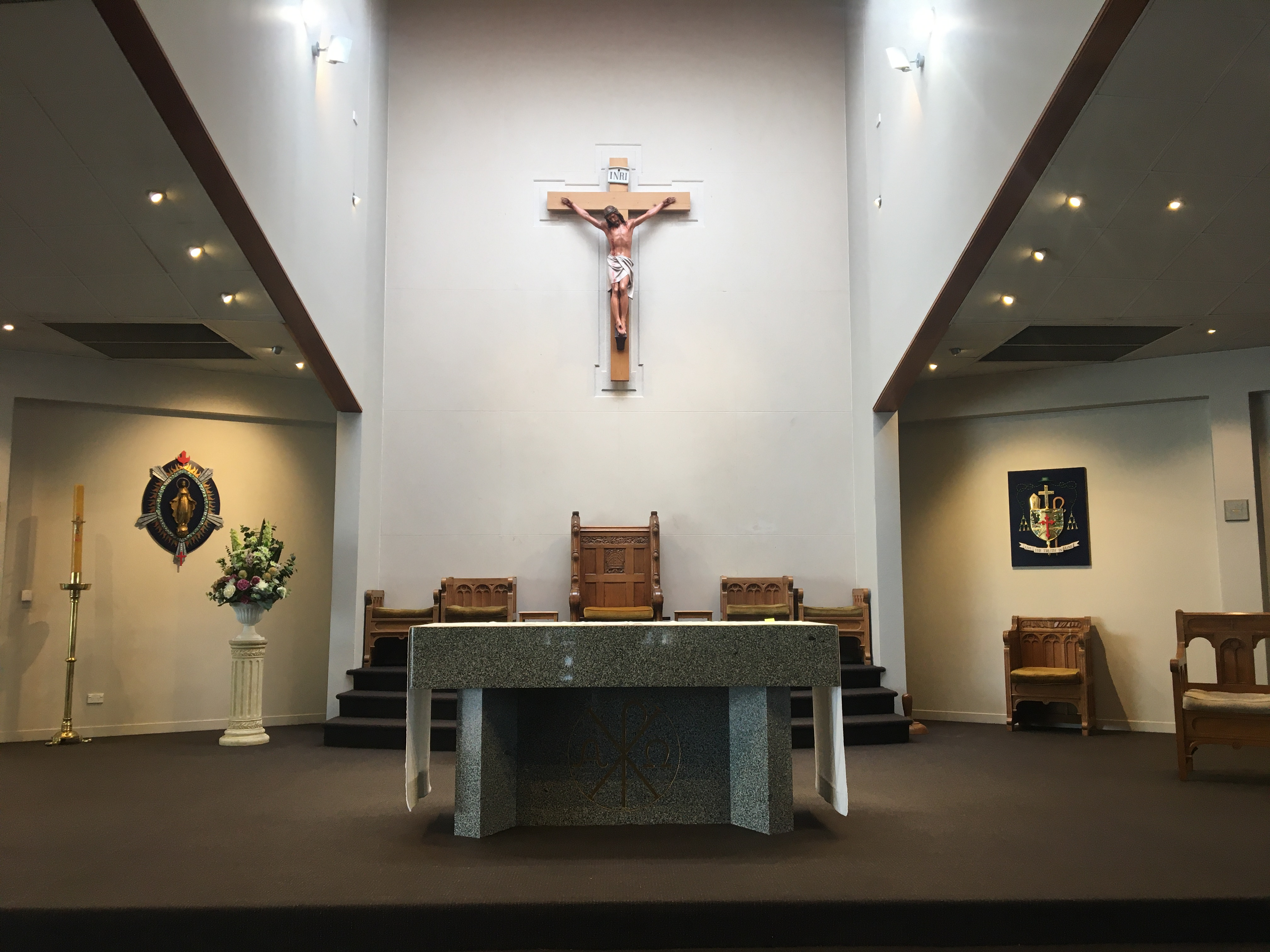
Sanctuary of the Cathedral

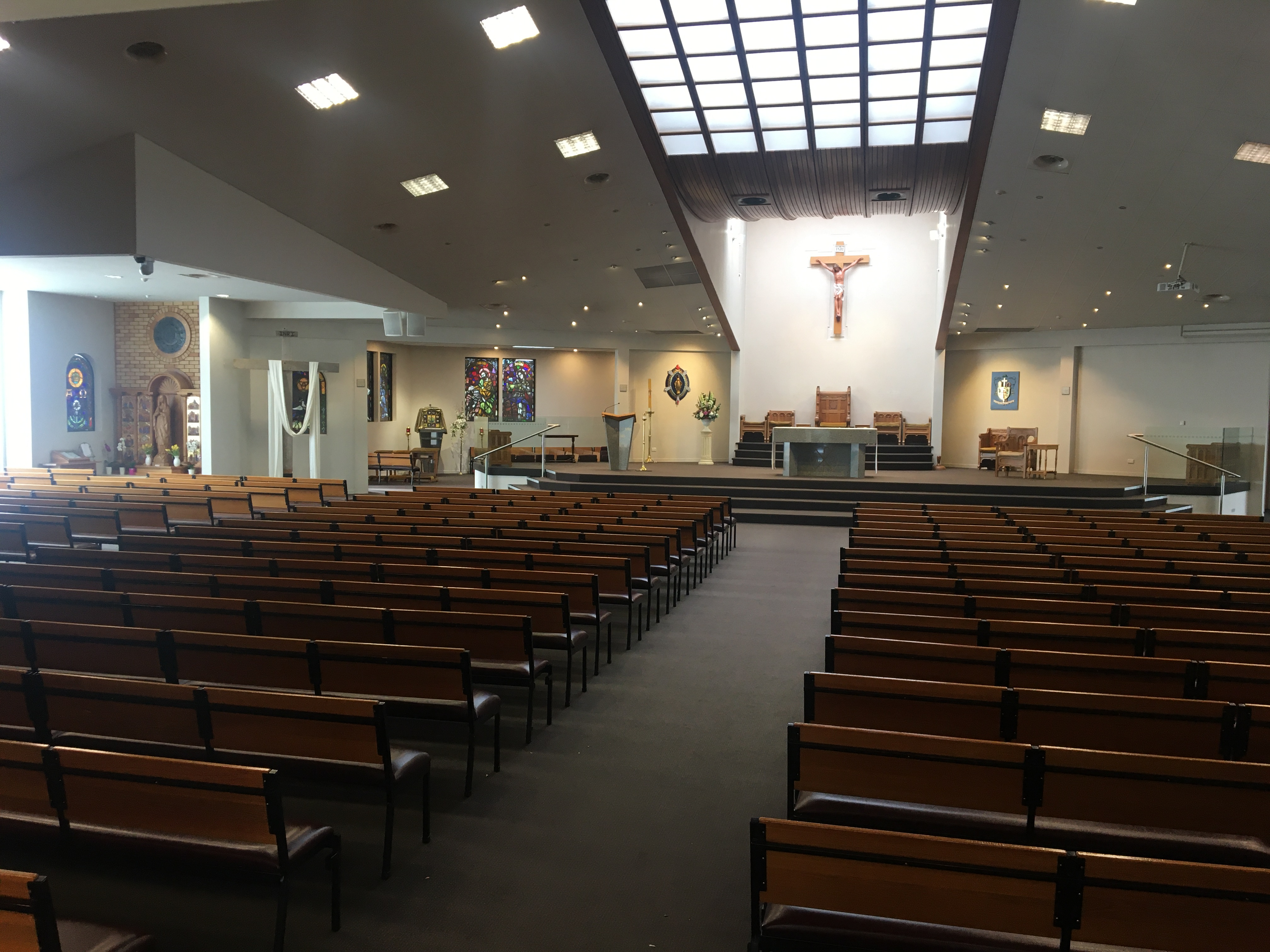
The Cathedral interior, featuring the Marian Shrine (left), Chapel of the Blessed Sacrament (centre-back) and the Sanctuary (centre-right)

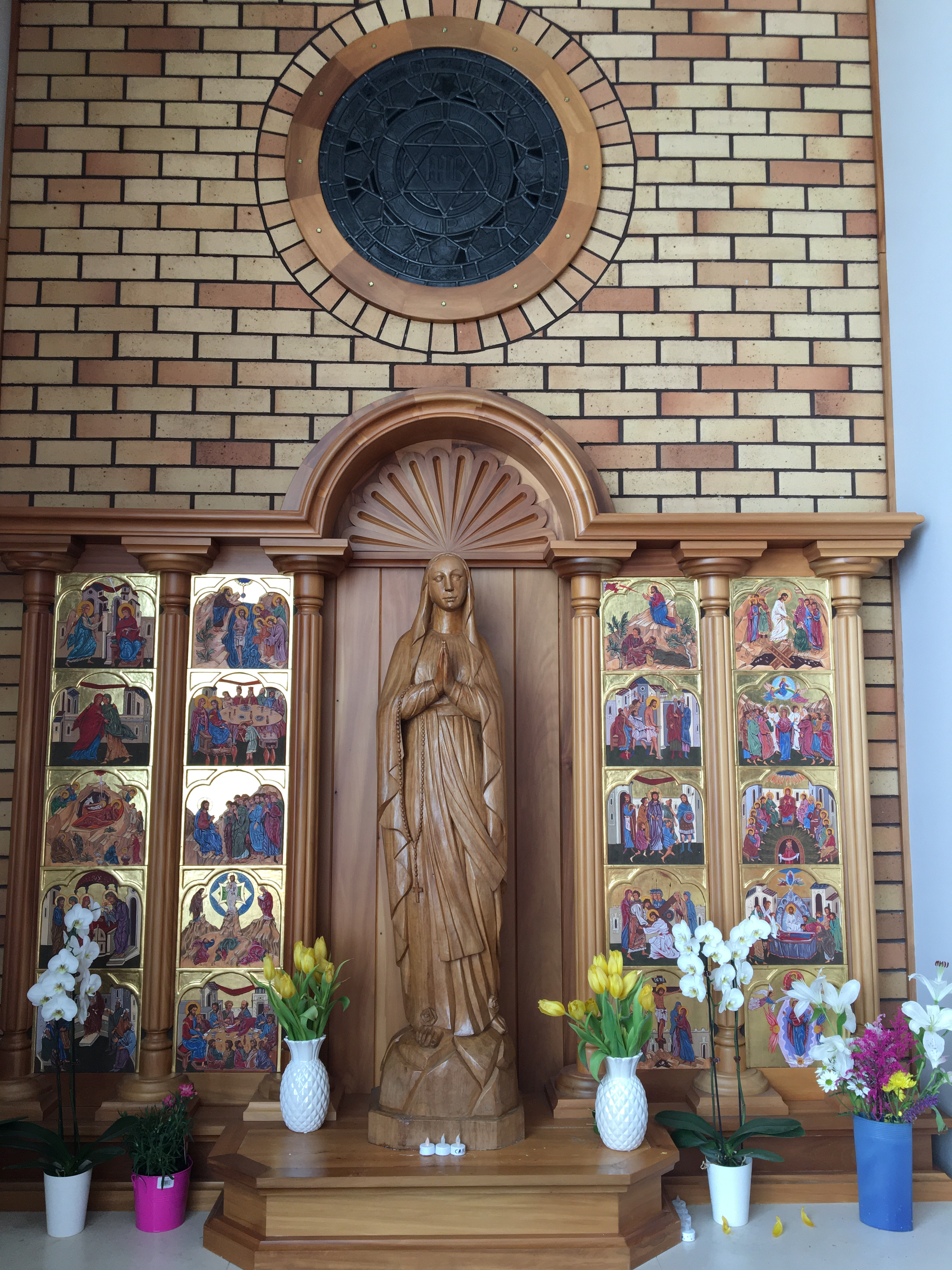
The Marian Shrine in the Cathedral, featuring icons depicting the Joyful, Luminous, Sorrowful and Glorious mysteries of The Rosary

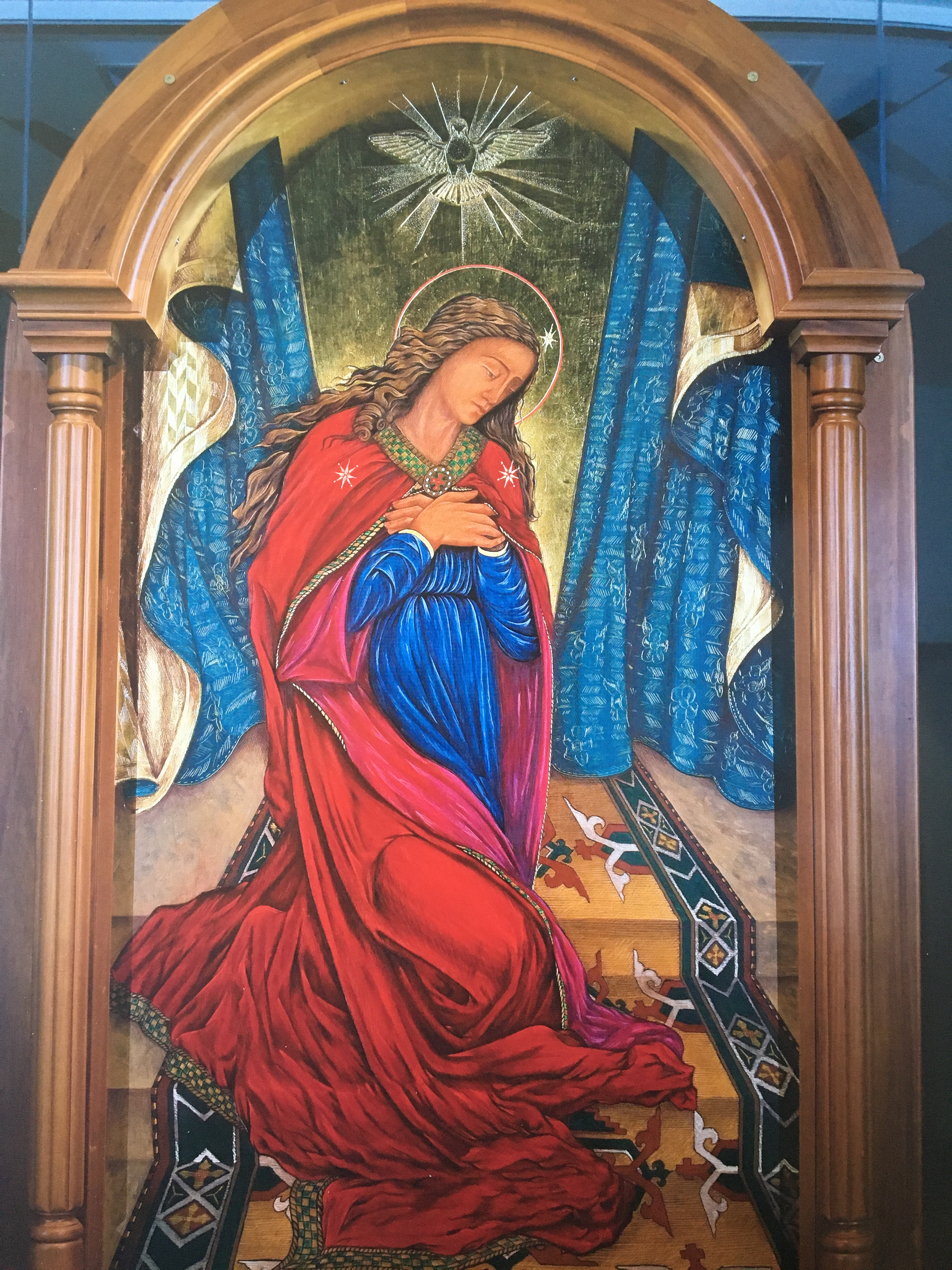
An Icon of the Blessed Virgin Mary greets visitors in the main entrance - one of the many pieces of sacred art in the Cathedral

The cathedral is particularly celebrated for a large stained glass window depicting the Resurrection of Christ. This was in the earlier St Mary's Church and was then placed in the rebuilt St Mary's church in 1975 and remained in place when that church was dedicated as the cathedral. "The steeple-like effect of this central window and bold cross above is a Hamilton landmark and it remains firmly in place in the remodelled cathedral, offering beauty and a sense of history". This Resurrection window has been associated with Hamilton's "church on the hill" for more than 50 years. It was made for the early Church of Our Lady of the Rosary in the 1950s, by Dutch immigrant artist Martin (Martinus Wouterous) Roestenburg who lived and worked in Taihape.

== Mass Times ==
There are a variety of Mass times celebrated each weekend at the cathedral. These are:

- Saturday evening, 6:00PM (vigil mass),
- Sunday morning, 7:30AM
- Sunday morning, 10:30AM
- Sunday evening at 6:00PM

The weekday Mass times at the cathedral are:

- Monday 8:00AM
- Tuesday 12:05PM
- Wednesday 8:00AM and 12:05PM
- Thursday 8:00AM and 12:05PM
- Friday 12:05PM
