= Roman Catholic Diocese of Auckland =

Latin Catholic jurisdiction in New Zealand

Coordinates: 36.845312°S 174.747088°E

Diocese of Auckland Dioecesis Aucopolitana

Location
- Country: New Zealand
- Territory: New Zealand
- Ecclesiastical province: Wellington

Statistics
- Area: 24,500 km^{2} (9,500 sq mi)
- Population: Total; Catholics: 1,777,545; 171,123 (9.63%)
- Parishes: 68

Information
- Denomination: Catholic Church
- Sui iuris church: Latin Church
- Rite: Roman Rite
- Established: 13 May 1836
- Cathedral: St Patrick and St Joseph

Current leadership
- Pope: Leo XIV
- Bishop: Stephen Marmion Lowe
- Metropolitan Archbishop: Paul Martin SM
- Bishops emeritus: Patrick James Dunn

Website
- https://www.aucklandcatholic.org.nz

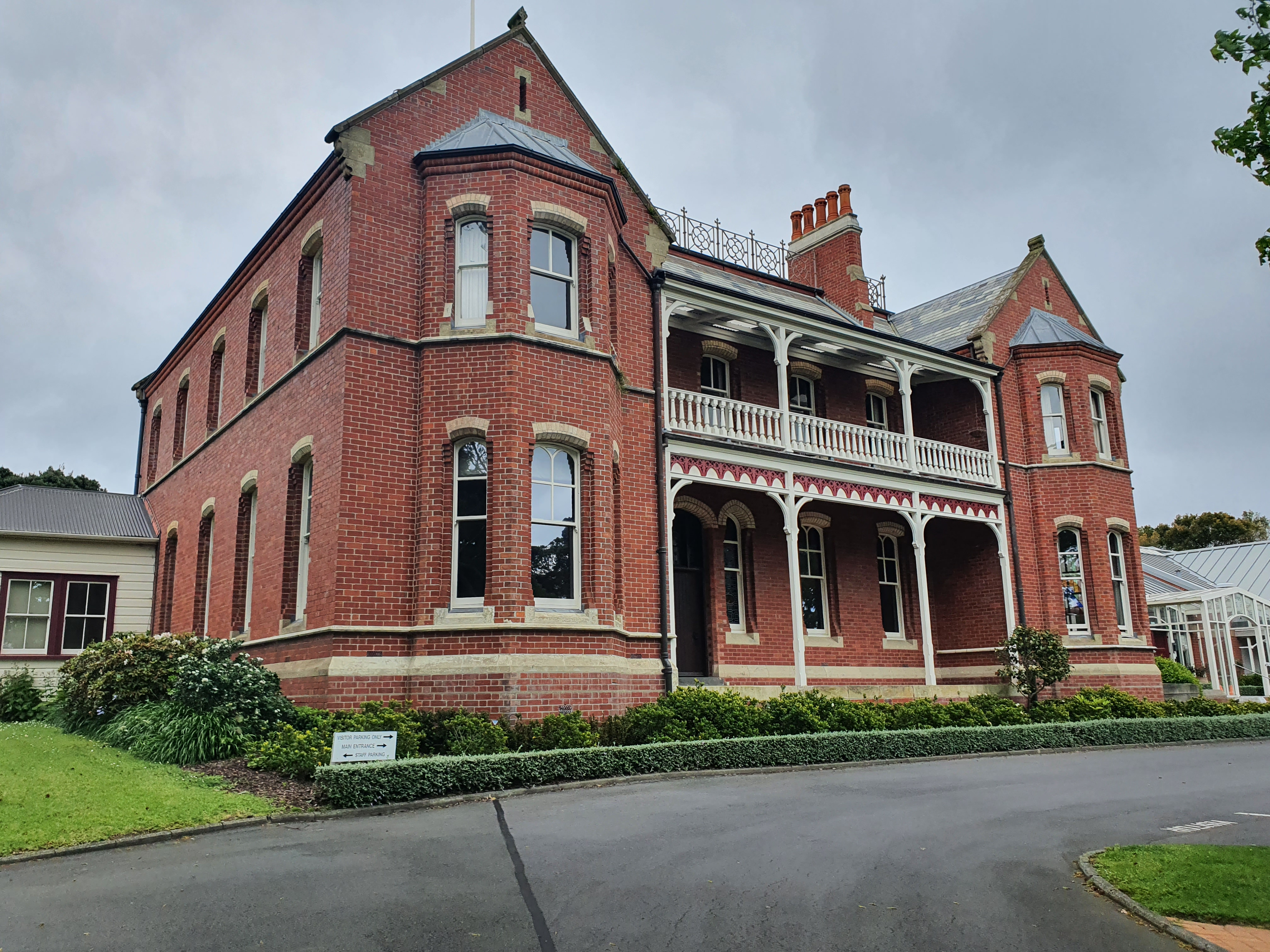
The Bishop's Castle of the Pompallier Diocesan Centre in Auckland

The Diocese of Auckland is a Latin Church ecclesiastical territory or diocese of the Catholic Church in New Zealand. It was one of two dioceses in the country that were established on 20 June 1848. Auckland became a suffragan diocese of the Archdiocese of Wellington in 1887. A large area of the diocese south of Auckland was split from the diocese on 6 March 1980 to form the Diocese of Hamilton. As of 2021, almost 40 per cent of New Zealand’s 471,000 Catholics lived within the diocese of Auckland.

== Ordinaries of Auckland ==
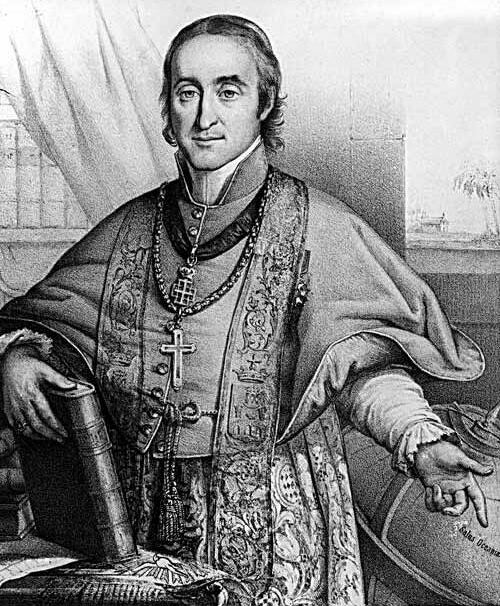
Jean Baptiste Pompallier, the 1st Bishop of Auckland

Tenure	Incumbent	Life
1836–1842	Jean-Baptiste-François Pompallier (Vicar Apostolic of Western Oceania); see below	1802–1871
1842–1848	Jean-Baptiste-François Pompallier (Vicar Apostolic of New Zealand); see above & below	1802–1871
1848–1869	Jean-Baptiste-François Pompallier (1st Bishop of Auckland); see above	1802–1871
1870–1874	Thomas Croke	1824–1902
1879–1881	Walter Steins SJ, Archbishop (personal title)	1800–1881
1882–1896	John Luck OSB	1840–1896
1896–1910	George Lenihan OSB	1858–1910
1910–1929	Henry Cleary	1859–1929
1929–1970	James Liston, Archbishop (personal title) in 1953	1881–1976
1970–1974	Reginald John Delargey (future Cardinal)	1914–1979
1974–1983	John Mackey	1918–2014
1983–1994	Denis Browne	1937–2024
1994–2021	Patrick Dunn	Born 1950
2021–present	Stephen Lowe	Born 1962

Delargey was appointed Archbishop of Wellington in 1974 (Cardinal in 1976).
Browne was appointed Bishop of Hamilton in New Zealand in 1994.

== Other bishops ==
=== Auxiliary bishops ===
- Reginald John Delargey (1914–1979) (Priest: 19 Mar 1938; Auxiliary Bishop: 25 Nov 1957; Bishop: 1 Sep 1970 to 25 Apr 1974); later Cardinal.
- Edward Gaines (Auxiliary Bishop: 28 Oct 1976 to 6 Mar 1980), appointed Bishop of Hamilton.
- John Hubert Macey Rodgers SM (1915–1997) Vicar Apostolic of Tonga (1953–1957), Vicar Apostolic of Tonga and Niue (1957–1966) Bishop of Tonga (1966–1973), Bishop of Rarotonga (1973–1977), Auxiliary Bishop of Auckland (1977–1985), Superior of the Mission, Funafuti, Tuvalu (1986).
- Patrick Dunn (Priest: 24 Apr 1976; Auxiliary Bishop: 10 Jun 1994; Bishop: 19 Dec 1994 to 17 Dec 2021).
- Michael Gielen (born 2 June 1971), Auxiliary Bishop of Auckland (2020–2022); Bishop of Christchurch (2022-present)

=== Coadjutor bishop ===
- James Michael Liston (1920–1929).

=== Bishop assistant ===
- Robin Walsh Leamy SM (1934 – 2022), Bishop Emeritus of Rarotonga, Cook Islands, (Bishop Assistant in Auckland: 1996–2009))

=== Other priests of this diocese who became bishops ===
- Matthew Joseph Brodie, appointed Bishop of Christchurch in 1915
- Peter Thomas McKeefry, appointed Coadjutor Archbishop of Wellington in 1947; Cardinal from 1969
- Owen Noel Snedden, appointed Auxiliary Bishop of Wellington in 1962

== Current bishops ==
- Stephen Lowe, 12th Bishop of Auckland (17 December 2021 - present)
- Patrick Dunn, Emeritus Bishop of Auckland

== Cathedral ==
- St Patrick's Cathedral, Auckland

== Parishes ==
The parish churches in the Roman Catholic Diocese of Auckland:

- Auckland City, Cathedral St Patrick & St Joseph
- Avondale, St Mary of the Immaculate Conception
- Balmoral, Good Shepherd
- BeachHaven, Maria Assumpta
- Blockhouse Bay, St Dominic
- Clover Park, St Peter Chanel
- Coromandel Peninsula & Hauraki Plains
- Dargaville, Sacred Heart
- Devonport, St Francis de Sales & All Souls
- East Coast Bays Parishes
- Ellerslie, Immaculate Conception
- Epsom, Our Lady of the Sacred Heart
- Flat Bush, St Luke
- Glen Eden, Our Lady of Lourdes
- Glen Innes, St Pius X
- Glendowie, Mother of Perpetual Help
- Glenfield, St Thomas More
- Grey Lynn, St Joseph
- Helensville, St Joseph
- Henderson, Holy Cross
- Hibiscus Coast
- Hillsborough, St John Vianney
- Howick, Our Lady, Star of the Sea
- Kaitaia, Holy Family
- Kerikeri, Holy Family
- Korean Parish, Holy Family
- Mangere Parishes
- Manurewa, St Anne
- Massey, St Paul
- Meadowbank, Our Lady of Fatima
- Mid-North Parishes
- Mt Albert, St Mary
- Mt Wellington, St Bernadette
- Newton, St Benedicts
- Northcote, St Mary
- Onehunga, Our Lady of the Assumption
- Orakei, St Joseph
- Otahuhu, Ss Joseph & Joachim
- Owairaka, Christ the King
- Pakuranga, St Mark
- Papatoetoe, Holy cross parish
- Waiheke Island, St Peter
- Warkworth, Holy Name
- Wellsford, St Mary
- Whangarei, St Francis Xavier

== See also ==
- St Michael's Church, Remuera
- Holy Cross Seminary
- Marist Seminary
- Good Shepherd College
- Holy Name Seminary
- St Mary's Seminary
- Roman Catholicism in New Zealand
- List of New Zealand Catholic bishops
- Diocese of Rarotonga

== Secondary schools ==
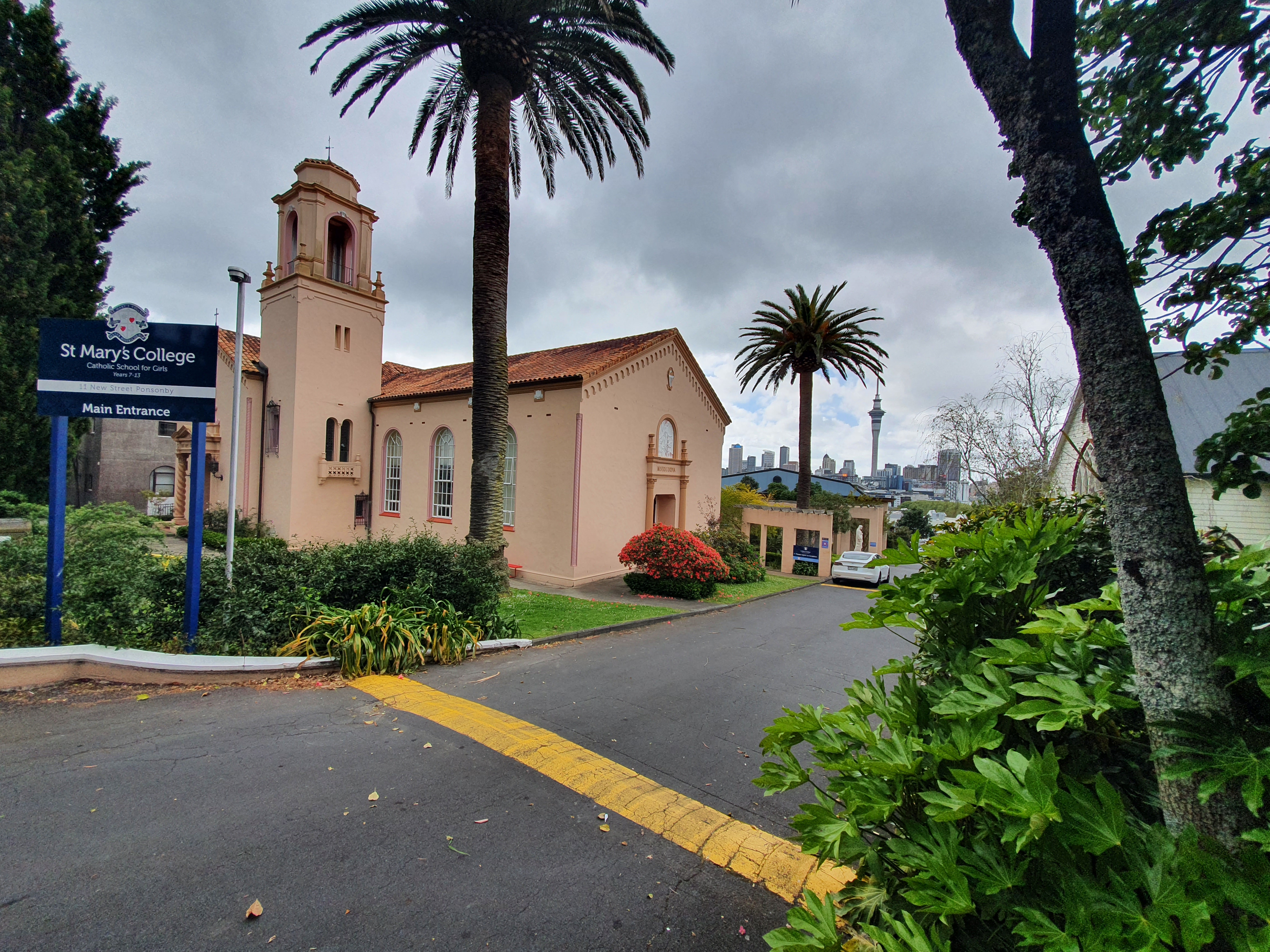
St Mary's College, Auckland

- Baradene College, Remuera, Auckland
- Carmel College, Milford, Auckland
- De La Salle College, Mangere East, Auckland
- Liston College, Henderson Auckland
- Marcellin College, Royal Oak, Auckland
- Marist College, Mt Albert, Auckland
- McAuley High School, Otahuhu, Auckland
- Pompallier Catholic College, Maunu, Whangarei
- Rosmini College, Takapuna, Auckland
- Sacred Heart College, Glen Innes, Auckland
- Sancta Maria College, Howick, Auckland
- St Dominic's College, Henderson, Auckland
- St Ignatius of Loyola Catholic College, Drury, Auckland
- St Mary's College, Ponsonby, Auckland
- St Paul's College, Ponsonby, Auckland
- St Peter's College, Grafton, Auckland

=== Defunct schools ===
- Hato Petera College, Northcote, Auckland

== Missions ==
Croatian Catholic Mission in Auckland was established in 1904. Current mission leader (since August 2024) is rev. Danko Bizjak, priest of the Sisak Diocese.
