= Edward Gaines =

Roman Catholic bishop

The Most Reverend Edward Gaines
- Bishop of Hamilton, New Zealand
- See: Hamilton, New Zealand
- Installed: 19 June 1980
- Term ended: 6 September 1994
- Predecessor: Post Created
- Successor: Denis George Browne
- Other post: Auxiliary Bishop of Auckland (1976–80)

Orders
- Ordination: 13 July 1950
- Consecration: 8 December 1976

Personal details
- Born: 3 November 1926 Whanganui, New Zealand
- Died: 6 September 1994 (aged 67)
- Denomination: Roman Catholic Church

Edward Russell Gaines (3 November 1926 – 6 September 1994) was the Catholic Auxiliary Bishop of Auckland (1976–1981) and was the first bishop of the Roman Catholic Diocese of Hamilton, New Zealand (1980–94).

Born in Whanganui in 1926, Gaines received his secondary education at St. Peter's College, Epsom, conducted by the Christian Brothers. He then went on to study at Holy Name Seminary, Christchurch (operated by the Jesuit order) and Holy Cross College, Mosgiel (operated by the Vincentian order).

Gaines was ordained a Catholic priest on 13 July 1950 by Archbishop James Liston at St Patrick's Cathedral, Auckland. On 8 December 1976 he was ordained a bishop by Bishop John Mackey and served as auxiliary bishop of Auckland until 1980. On 19 June 1980 Gaines was appointed as the first bishop of the new Diocese of Hamilton.

Bishop Gaines died on 6 September 1994, aged 67.

Catholic Church titles
Preceded by New title	Bishop of Hamilton; 1980–1994	Succeeded by Denis Browne
Preceded by –	Auxiliary Bishop of Auckland; 1976–1980	Succeeded by –
