= Denis Browne (bishop) =

New Zealand Catholic bishop (1937–2024)

The Most Reverend Denis Browne CNZM
- Bishop Emeritus of Hamilton
- Archdiocese: Wellington
- Diocese: Hamilton
- Appointed: 19 December 1994
- Term ended: 22 November 2014
- Predecessor: Edward Gaines
- Successor: Stephen Lowe
- Previous posts: Bishop of Rarotonga (1977–1983); Bishop of Auckland (1983–1994)

Orders
- Ordination: 30 June 1962
- Consecration: 29 June 1977 by John Rodgers

Personal details
- Born: 21 September 1937 Auckland, New Zealand
- Died: 1 September 2024 (aged 86) Auckland, New Zealand
- Motto: Veritatem facientes in caritate (Live the truth in love)

Denis George Browne CNZM (21 September 1937 – 1 September 2024) was the bishop emeritus of the Diocese of Hamilton, New Zealand having served as its bishop from 1994 to 2014. Previously, he was Bishop of Cook Islands and Niue (1977–1983) and then became the tenth Catholic Bishop of Auckland (1983–1994).

== Biography ==
Browne was born in Auckland on 21 September 1937, the son of Neville John and Catherine Anne Browne. Browne received his primary education at St. Michael's Primary school, Remuera, and his secondary education at St. Peter's College, Epsom, conducted by the Christian Brothers. He then went on to study at Holy Name Seminary, Christchurch (operated by the Jesuit order) and Holy Cross College, Mosgiel (operated by the Vincentian order).

Denis Browne was ordained a Catholic priest on 30 June 1962 by James Liston, Archbishop of Auckland, at St Patrick's Cathedral, Auckland. After ordination, he was assigned to parish work in Gisborne where he served from 1963 until 1968. He was at Papatoetoe 1968–1971 and at Remuera 1972–1975. He served in Tonga (Nukualofa, Houma,`Eva) in the period 1975–1977. On 29 June 1977, he was consecrated a bishop in St. Patrick's Cathedral, Auckland. He served as Bishop of the Cook Islands and Niue until 1983. He became the tenth Bishop of Auckland on 24 August 1983 and served in that post until 1994 when he was translated to Hamilton as its second bishop. He was president of the New Zealand Catholic Bishops Conference and a member of the executive committee of the Federation of Catholic Bishops Conferences of Oceania.

In 1990, Browne was awarded the New Zealand 1990 Commemoration Medal. In the 2001 Queen's Birthday Honours, he was appointed a Companion of the New Zealand Order of Merit (CNZM) for services to the community.

Browne's resignation from the see was accepted by Pope Francis on 22 November 2014 and his successor Stephen Lowe was appointed the 3rd Bishop of Hamilton on the same date. Browne was the principal consecrator at Stephen Lowe's episcopal consecration in the Hamilton Cathedral of the Blessed Virgin Mary on 13 February 2015.

Browne died in Auckland on 1 September 2024, at the age of 86.

Catholic Church titles
Preceded by Edward Gaines	Bishop of Hamilton; 1994–2014	Succeeded by Stephen Lowe
Preceded by John Mackey	Bishop of Auckland; 1983–1994	Succeeded by Patrick Dunn
Preceded by John Rodgers	Bishop of Rarotonga; 1977–1983	Succeeded by Robin Leamy
