= St Benedict's Church, Newton =

St Benedict's Church
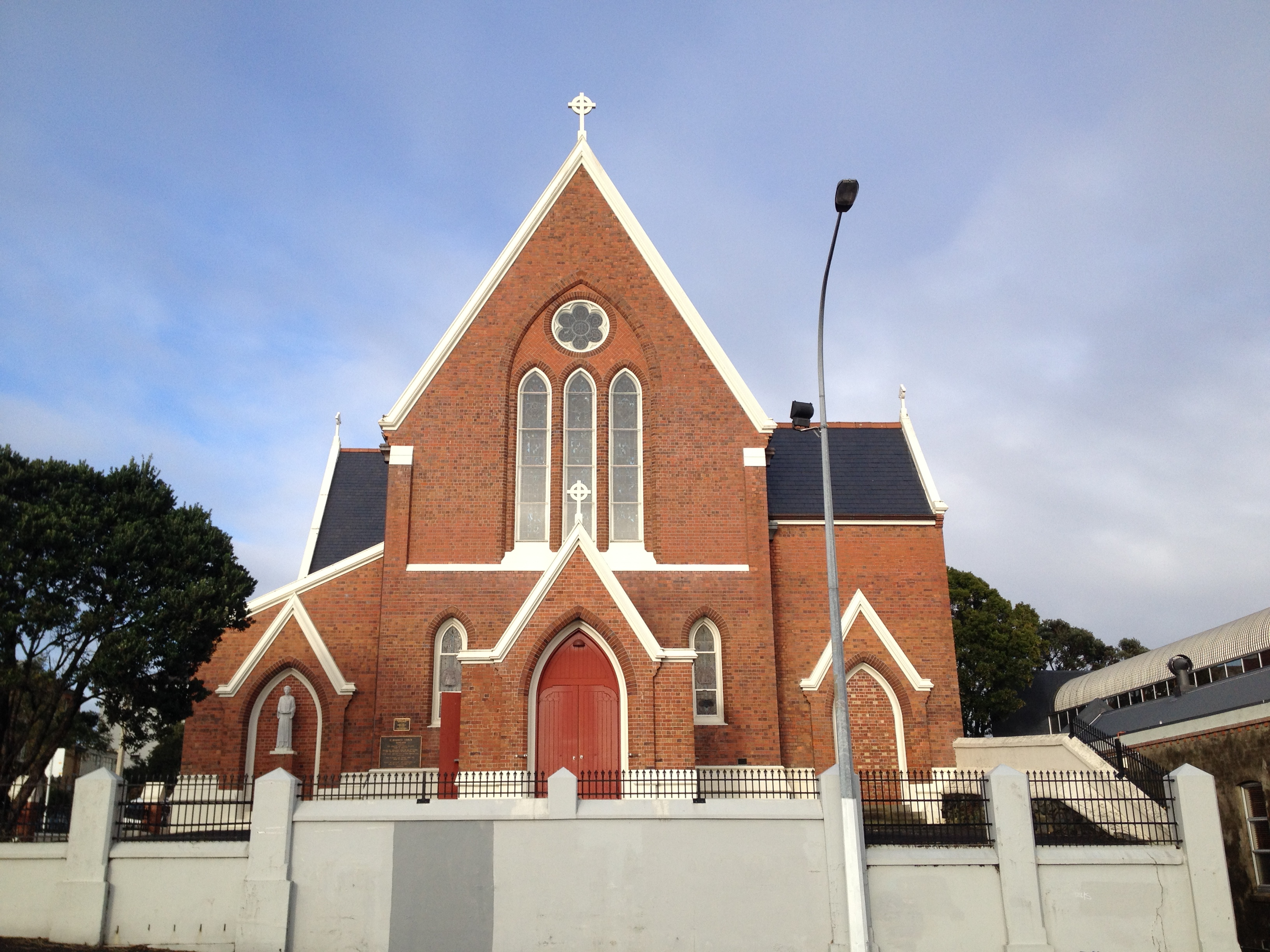
- St Benedict's Church
- St Benedict's Church
- 36°51′40″S 174°45′38″E
- Address: 1 St Benedict's Street, Newton, Auckland
- Country: New Zealand
- Denomination: Catholic
- Website: stbenedictsauckland.org.nz

History
- Consecrated: 22 April 1888

Architecture
- Architect: E. Mahoney and Son
- Style: Gothic Revival
- Years built: 1887–1888
- Groundbreaking: 1881

Administration
- Diocese: Auckland
- Parish: Parish of Newton

Heritage New Zealand – Category 1
- Designated: 6 June 2013
- Reference no.: 640

St Benedict's Church is a historic neo-Gothic Catholic church in Newton, Auckland, New Zealand, the church complex includes a Presbytery and a former convent — at one point the complex included a school and club rooms but these have since been demolished.

Constructed in the 1880s, the site housed the first Benedictine mission in New Zealand and later the Sisters of St Joseph for almost a century. The church is registered as a category 1 building with Heritage New Zealand.

== Description ==
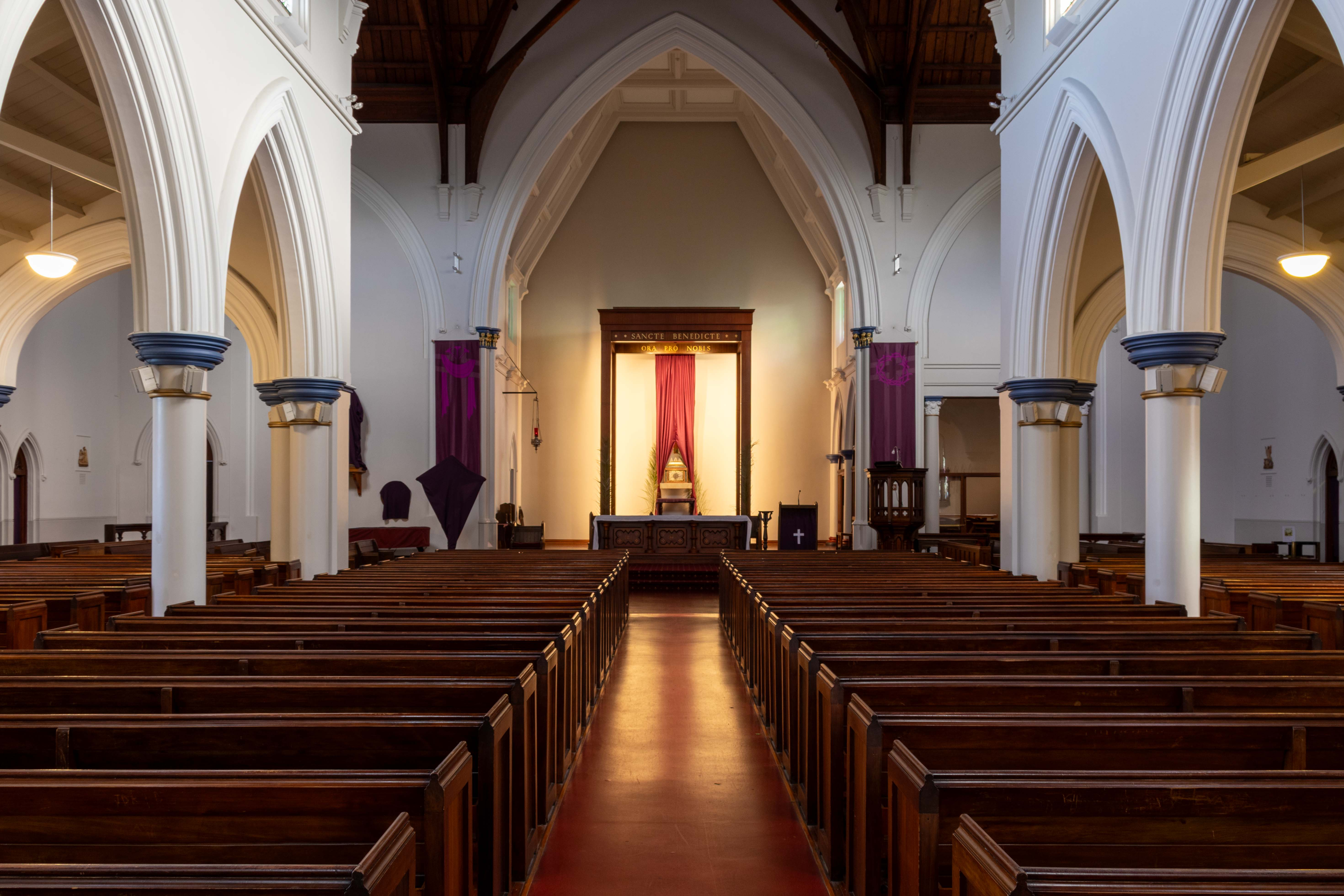
Interior of St Benedict's Church

The church site is along the eponymous St Benedict's Street at the corner of Alex Evans Street and sits on an elevated position above Auckland. The site houses a presbytery, former club room, and former convent building. Along Alex Evans Street is a retaining wall with memorial tablets to the priests of the parish.

St Benedict's Church is a Gothic Revival brick church, it has a cruciform plan and has an aisled nave, transepts, sanctuary, and a basement. Stained glass windows in the transepts are of Victorian and Art Nouveau design. There are clerestory windows above each aisle. Above the porch is a triple-lancet window and a rose window. Gothic arches supported by brick columns line the nave. The jambs of the doors and windows are made from Oamaru stone is used for other stonework Malmsbury bluestone. The timberwork is heart kauri and the roof is constructed from English slate. The roof is held up by a king-post. The sanctuary has a coffered ceiling and a baldaccino above where the altar used to sit. The church's design was possibly influenced by St Augustine's Church, Ramsgate and Augustus Pugin—as the son of the architect hired had visited St Augustine's Church and monastery in Ramsgate and some features such as the spireless tower, asymmetrical elevations, and exposed brickwork are indicative of Pugin's influence. St Benedict's has been compared to St Wilfrid's Church, Hulme, another church designed by Pugin.

The presbytery is of the same Gothic revival brick style with four floors, including the basement. The roof is corrugated iron and there are stained glass windows. The ground floor level windows are rectangular-headed surrounded by ashlar with stone mullions at the upper part of the window. The first floor windows have an arch shape and a Y-shaped mullion. A gablet contains a circular window. There is a parapet and moulded cornices. The road facing side is asymmetrical and has exposed brickwork with the rest of the exterior being plastered. An open porch with a steep gable encloses the entrance which has a Gothic fanlight and door. The archway leading to the hall is ornate with Corinthian capital trusses

The club rooms is a single-storeyed Arts and Crafts building constructed with plastered brick. It has a rectangular floor plan. The corrugated iron roof is gabled with a parapet. It has frontage to Alex Evans Street. A single storey addition exists at the south. The building has ornamentation such as arched windows, ashlar-scoring, and lattice-work.

St Benedict's Convent is a two-storey Edwardian brick structure. The corrugated iron roof is timber framed and has three brick corbelled chimneys. The ground floor initially contained a refectory and chapel, the first floor housed the study and dormitory. It has an ornate entrance porch with frieze and fretwork woodwork topped with a cross. and a two-storey verandah on the side. It originally had stained glass windows. An enclosed verandah is at the rear of the building. The façade features facetted bay windows and red banded brickwork. There are double-hung sash windows, French doors, and casement windows. The interior has architraves, rose ceilings, and a decorative plastered archway where the chapel was.

== History ==
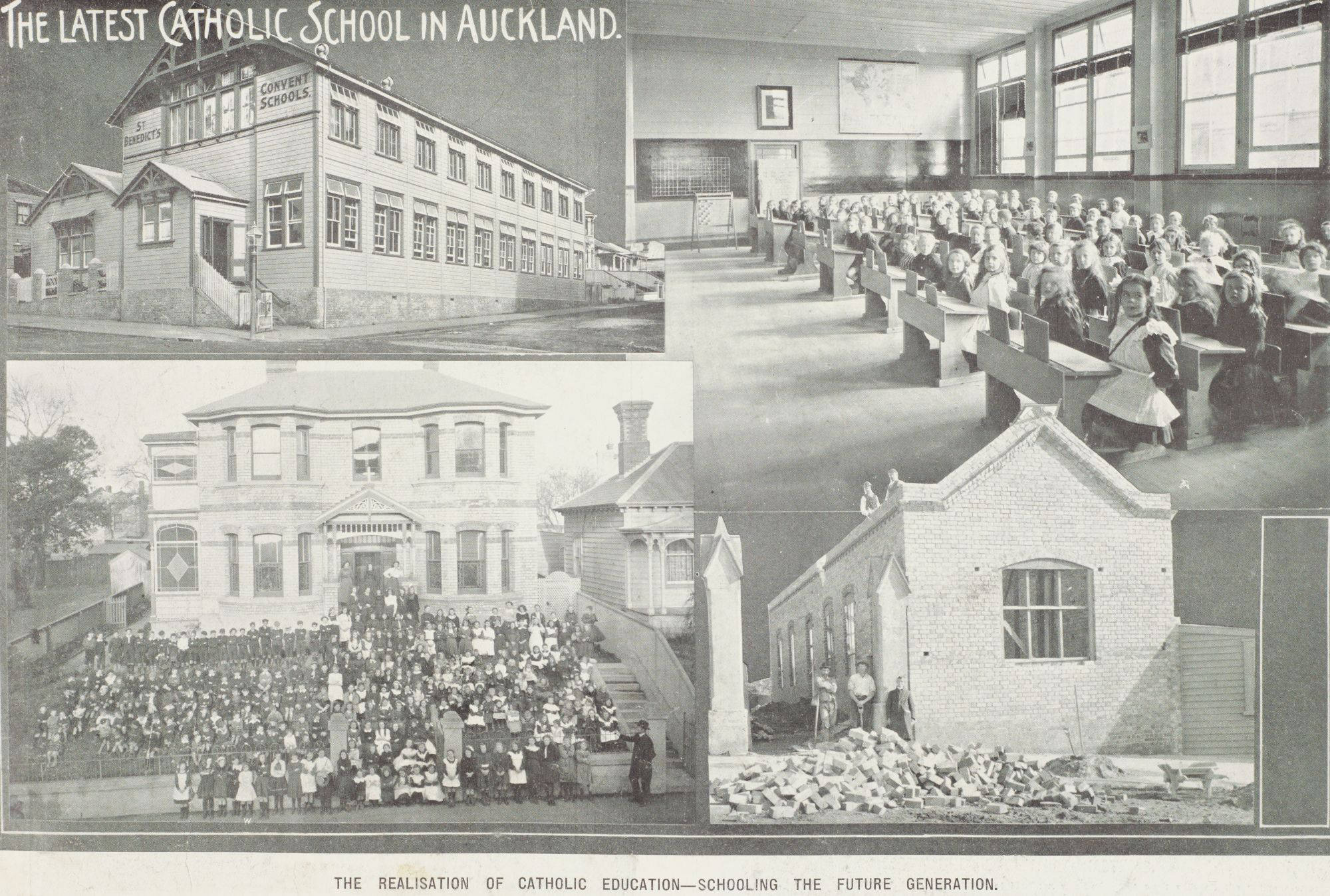
Collage showing the school (top), convent (bottom left), and club rooms (bottom right)

In 1879 Walter Steins Bisschop, the Archbishop of the Diocese of Auckland and Dom Raffaele Cesta, the Abbot General of the Benedictines in Subiaco, agreed to establishing a mission in New Zealand. In 1880 and 1881 the Catholic Church purchased the land for this purpose. The Benedictines were intended to manage a parish that catered for the growing population outside of Auckland and later take over the Auckland Diocese. The parish centred around St Benedict's extended both west and south of the city. The fathers came from the St Augustine's Abbey, Ramsgate, an outpost near Gawler, South Australia, and Subiaco. Between 1880 and 1890 the Benedictines accounted for half of the Auckland Diocese's clergymen. An early 13th century style English Gothic kauri timber church designed by Edward Mahoney was constructed in 1881–1882 for the Benedictines. This church was the largest in Auckland possibly the country at the time of completion. It was named St Benedict's after the founder of the Order of Saint Benedict, Saint Benedict of Nursia. It opened in July 1882.

John Edmund Luck was appointed Bishop of Auckland in August 1882, although he did not arrive in New Zealand until November. Shortly after Luck's arrival St Benedict's Church was proposed as the potential cathedral for Auckland instead of St Patrick's. Around this time St Benedict's parish had 1500–2000 worshippers and held more communions than St Patrick's parish. A fire broke out in December 1886 which destroyed the church and presbytery. It was decided that the new church be built of brick and stone to avoid this. A temporary timber structure was put up quickly whilst work on the new brick structure, designed by either Edward or his son Thomas (Note: In 1884 Thomas took a trip to Ramsgate and later became head of the firm), took place.

The new church started construction in 1887 and finished in 1888, the presbytery was finished shortly after in the same year. The church's final design was simpler than what was planned. James Job Holland won the tender — Holland had also designed the masonry foundation of the old church, which had survived the fire and was reused for the new building. The new church was described as the largest in New Zealand and influenced ecclesiastical architecture for Catholic churches in the Auckland Province. It was consecrated on 22 April 1888 by Archbishop Francis William Redwood.

Construction on the new presbytery had started in February 1888. John Lynch won the tender at £1,386. The date of completion is unknown but it likely finished around the time St Benedict's Church opened. Like the church, financial constraints resulted in the final building being less grand than what was originally planned. Sometime after 1908 but before 1923 two extensions were made to the presbytery: a basement and single storey extension. The presbytery was used to host meetings of the Guild of St Luke. The guild was founded by James Michael Liston, parish priest and later Bishop of Auckland, for the purpose of explaining Catholic teachings on social issues.

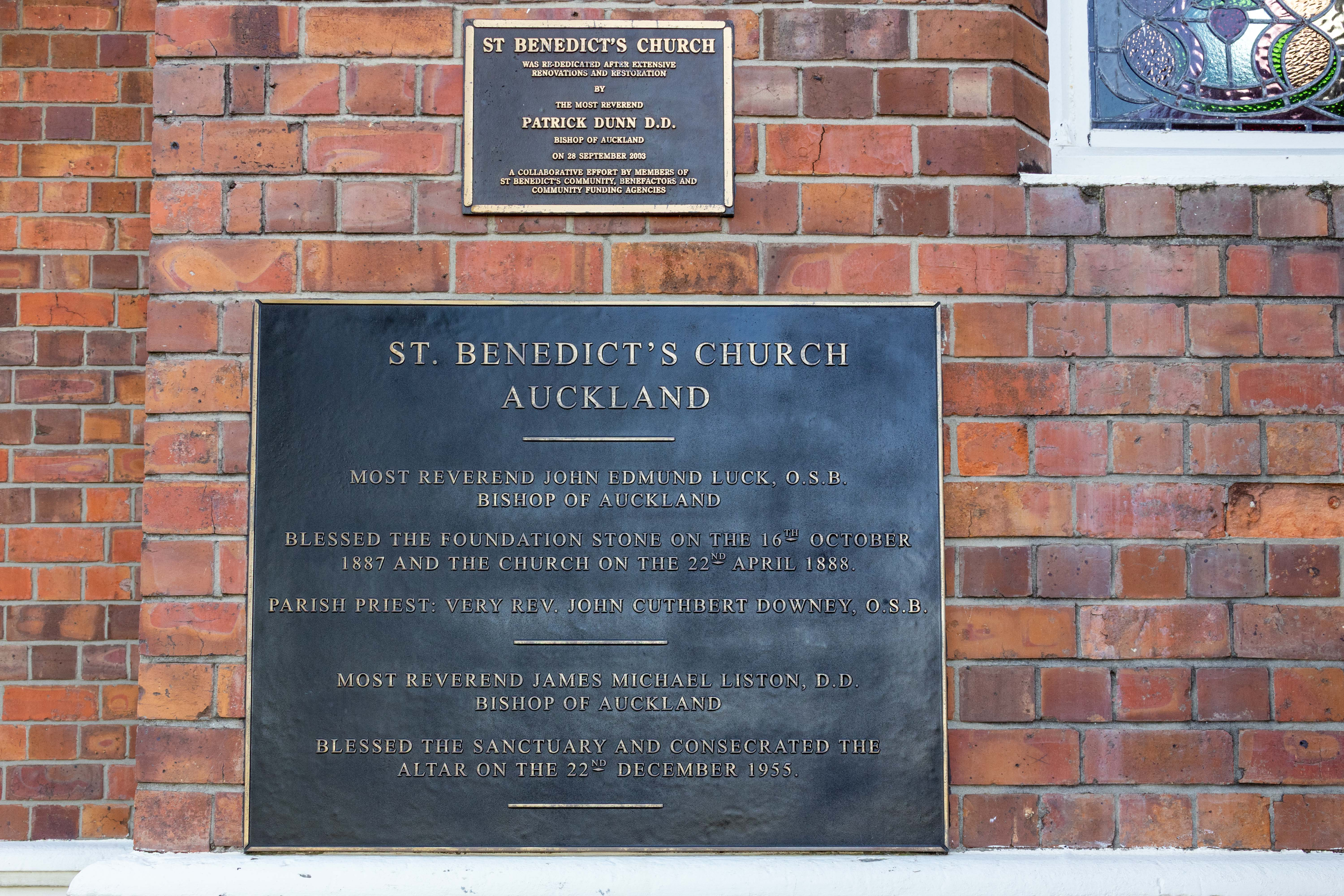
Dedication plaque on the church

In 1888 it was announced that the Benedictine mission was to wind down due to insufficient funds. In 1890 Father Sullivan returned to Britain. In 1893 an altar and reredos was put up in the church sanctuary. It was constructed by Francis Augustine Luck, brother of Bishop Luck. In 1895 the parish priest, Father Downey, died. Downey's funeral was held at the church and he was buried in Panmure. Bishop Luck, who was the superior following the departure of Father Sullivan, died in 1896. By 1899 the parish had come under Diocesan control following the end of the mission. The succeeding priest was Reverend George Gillan. Under Gillan some modifications were made to the church: boundary railings were added in 1900, the interior walls were plastered in 1905, and an organ was installed in 1907.

In 1884 the Sisters of St Joseph of the Sacred Heart arrived in Auckland. The Sisters ran a school on Karangahape Road. Initially the sisters lived in a small wooden cottage opposite the church. By 1885 the sisters had moved to Sussex Street in Grey Lynn to work at a church school. In 1898 St Benedict's School was opened on the corner of Gladstone (St Benedict's) and Alex Evans Street. The school's opening resulted in the sisters returning to the cottage and in 1901 Mary MacKillop had purchased the property. The school grew over the years and the cottage could not accommodate enough sisters and thus it was decided to build a convent next to the cottage for the sisters.

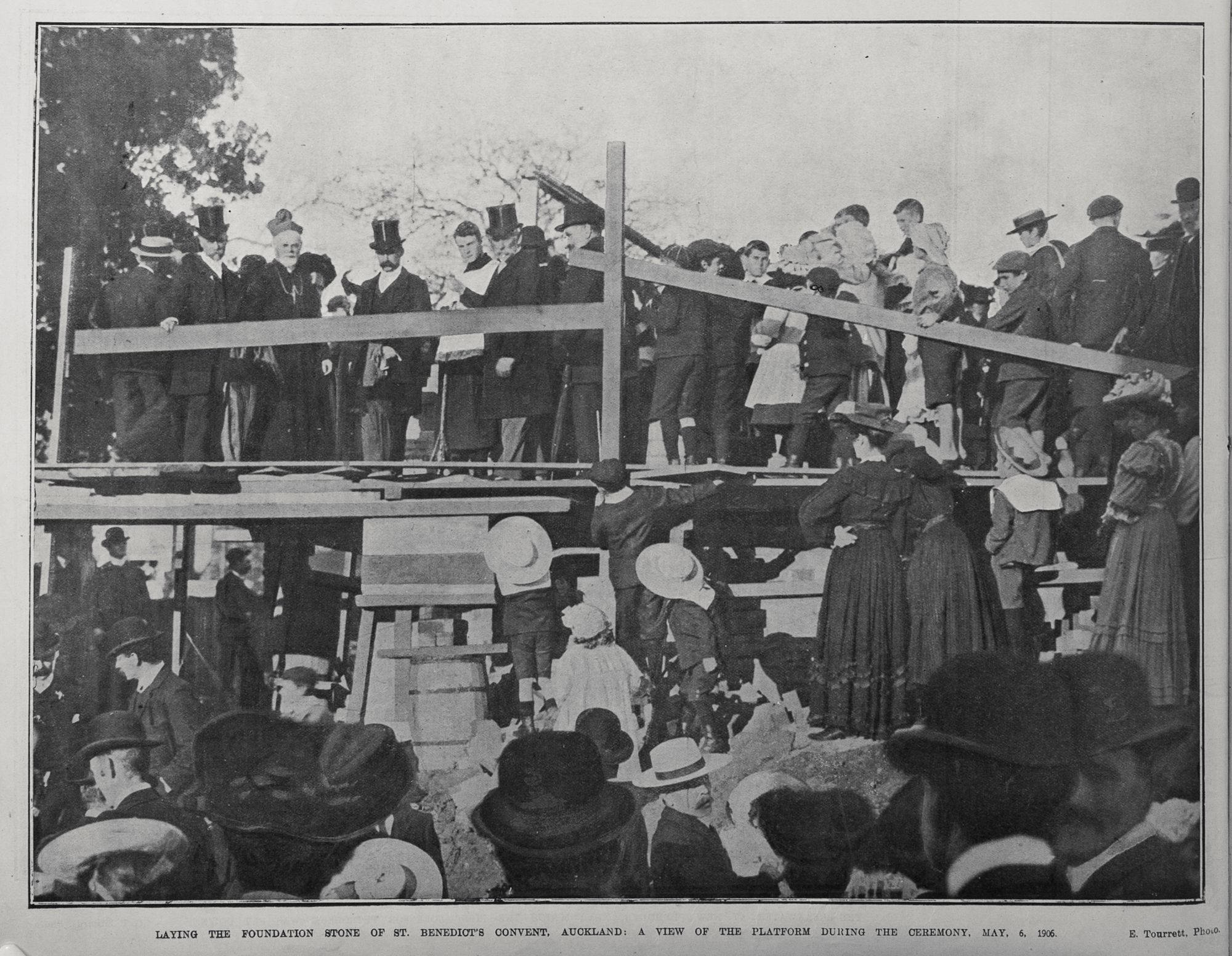
Ceremony for the laying of the foundation stone of St Benedict's Convent, Newton

E. Mahoney & Son was hired to design the convent and James Job Holland was contracted to build it. Right Reverend George Lenihan, the Bishop of Auckland, laid the foundation stone on 6 May 1906. There was a large attendance for the ceremony from Catholic clergymen. Notable attendees included the Mayor of Auckland, Arthur Myers and the chairman of the parliamentary Education Committee, Frederick Baume. Bishop Lenihan blessed and opened the convent on 16 December 1906.

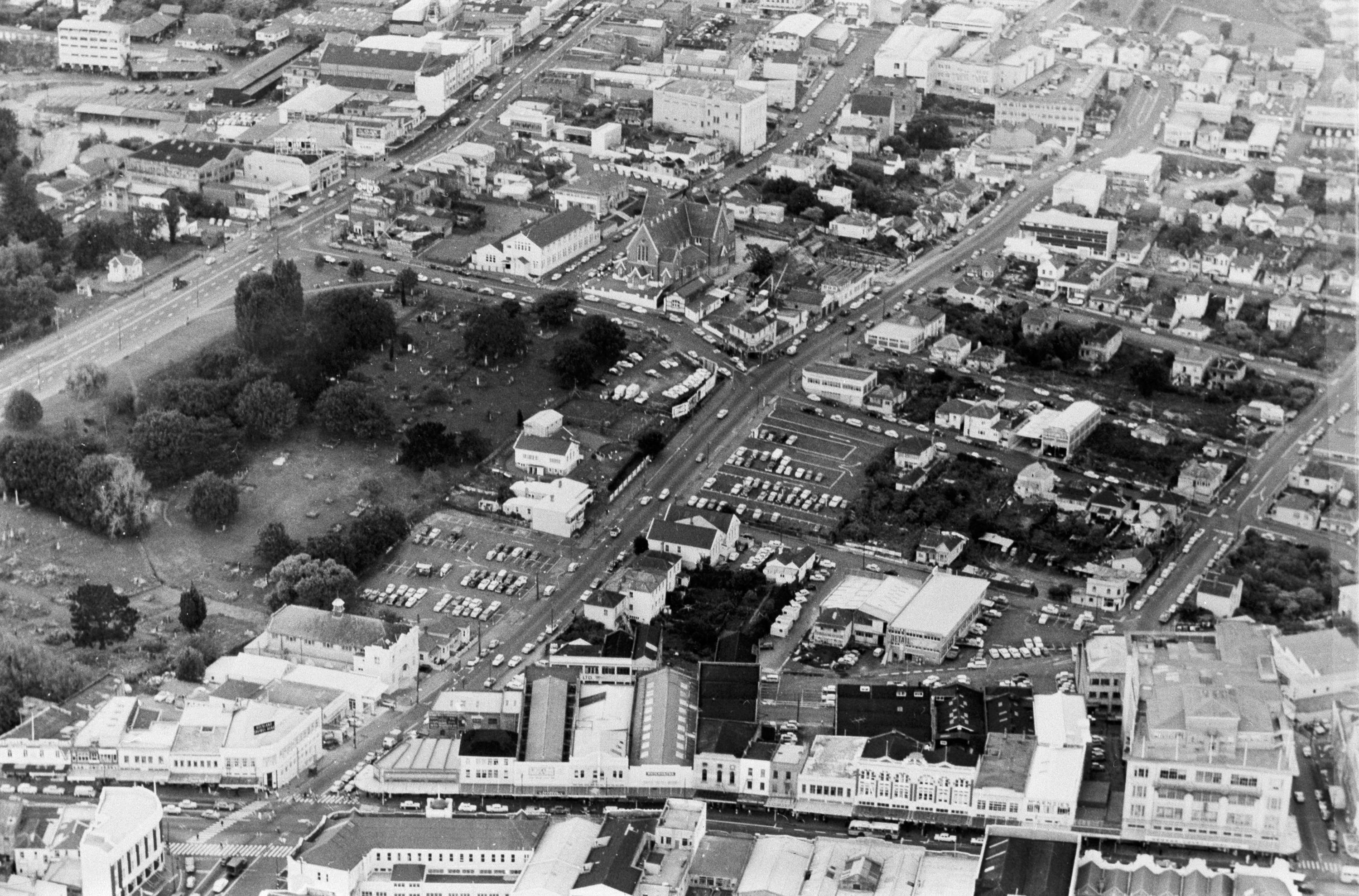
Aerial view of Newton and Symonds St Cemetery. Near the centre St Benedict's Church and St Benedict's School can be seen.

In 1910 a new school was constructed that could accommodate up to 530 pupils. The increase in pupils required more sisters to teach students. By 1918 tenders were sent out for a two-storey addition to the convent. E. Mahoney and Son was the architect and costs were approximately £1,340. The cottage was demolished to make way for this. The Bishop of Auckland, Henry Cleary, laid the foundation stone on 30 June 1918. The chapel added with the addition was later dedicated to Mary MacKillop who had been canonised in 1925. In 1927 a bullnose verandah was added to the rear. In 1957 renovations and alterations were carried out, the alterations primarily consisted of reducing room sizes to increase the amount of room on the first floor and installing louvered windows. Five years later a simplistic laundry and storeroom were added to the rear.

The Sisters of St Joseph continued to expand their scope and influence in Auckland: new initiatives were established in Balmoral (1912), St Heliers (1927), Point Chevalier (1930), Three Kings (1946), Mission Bay (1949), Owairaka (1954), Mount Roskill (1987), Onehunga (1992), and Glenfield (1995).

Under Gillan the St Benedict's Club Rooms were constructed c.1917 and finished in 1919. St Benedict's Club was established in May 1894 as a young men's club and previously operated out of St Benedict's Hall which was built across the road from the church in 1896. The club room was a single storey brick structure with a gabled roof. As of 2012 the club rooms are used for private offices.

The parish decreased in size as churches in Grey Lynn, Balmoral, and Avondale all separated into their own parish. Liston was parish priest through the 1920s. Under Liston's leadership stained glass windows were installed in the transepts and new seating was installed.

From 1953 to 1955 a porch, offices, and a lady chapel were added; in addition, the sanctuary and sacristy—which were intended to be temporary—were replaced with brick. The presbytery had its top floor modified; Reginald Ford was the architect for all of these additions and modifications. In the 1960s the construction of the Auckland Motorway saw most of the nearby Catholic graveyard removed. The Dominican Order were responsible for the parish from 1976 to 2002. In 1987 the crypt was partitioned for administrative space. Between 2002 and 2003 a major restoration work was undertaken on the church. The church and presbytery remain in use by the Catholic Church.

St Benedict's School roll had declined, largely in part due to the Auckland Motorway's construction resulting in the displacement of many of Newton's residents and Newton being cut off from the central city by the motorway. In 1982 the school was closed and subsequently demolished. The convent was transferred to the Auckland Diocese in 1984. The convent remained unused for a significant period but by 2004 was in use as a hostel. Since 2018 the convent has been in use as a book store.
