= E. Mahoney and Son =

New Zealand architectural business

E. Mahoney and Son was an architectural business consisting of Edward Mahoney (1824 or 1825 – 28 April 1895) and his son and architectural partner, Thomas Mahoney (1855–1923), who were prominent New Zealand architects based in Auckland. They were able exponents of Gothic Revival and other styles, especially built in wood, but also in masonry and concrete. They designed numerous public (especially churches, notable examples of which are Our Lady of the Assumption Catholic Church, Onehunga, Church of St John the Baptist, Parnell, St Patrick's Cathedral, Auckland, and the Church of the Holy Sepulchre, Khyber Pass Road) and private buildings, many of which are still standing. They made a considerable contribution to Auckland's architectural heritage.

== History ==
Edward Mahoney arrived in Auckland in 1856 after emigrating from Cork in Ireland with his wife and three children. Edward was initially a merchant in Auckland selling building materials before becoming an architect. In 1876 Edward Mahoney formed an architectural practice with his son Thomas. In the 1880s, Edward's son Robert joined the practice. Edward retired from the practice in 1885 and Robert died in 1895. Thomas named the practice E. Mahoney & Son after Robert's death. The practice continued after Thomas' death in 1923 until closing in 1926.

== Thomas Mahoney ==
Thomas Mahoney was born in either 1854 or 1855. Thomas was president of the Auckland Institute of Architects in 1883, secretary in 1885, and treasurer in 1902. Thomas was president of the Auckland branch of the New Zealand Institute of Architects in 1907.

== List of buildings ==
Name	Date	Image	Note	Ref
Church of St. John the Baptist, Parnell	1861		Designed by Edward with later additions designed by Thomas	
St Mary's Old Convent Chapel	1866		Designed by Edward	
Old Choral Hall	1872		Designed by Edward	
Pah Homestead	1877		Designed by Edward	
Church of the Holy Sepulchre, Auckland	1881		Designed by Edward	
Carlton Club Hotel (former)	1887		Designed by Edward	
Our Lady of the Assumption, Auckland	1887		Designed by Thomas	
St Benedict's Church, Newton	1888		Designed by Thomas	
Auckland Customhouse	1889		Designed by Thomas	
Dilworth Terrace Houses	1889		Designed by Thomas	
St Patrick's Cathedral, Auckland	1901 and 1906–1907		First stage (1901) by Edward and second stage (1906–1907) by Thomas	
Smith and Caughey's Elliot St facade	1910			
Duchesne Building, Baradene College	1910			
Wright's Building	1911		Designed by Thomas	
St Joseph's Convent, Grey Lynn	1922			
Bank of New Zealand, Devonport	1925–1926			
