= Mary Maher =

Mary Maher may refer to:

- Mary Cecilia Maher (1799–1878), New Zealand religious sister, teacher, and social worker
- Mary Maher (journalist) (1940–2021), Irish journalist, trade unionist, and feminist
