= Mother Mary Cecilia =

Mother Mary Cecilia may refer to:

- Mary Cecilia Bailly (1815–1898), Superior General of the Sisters of Providence of Saint Mary-of-the-Woods, Indiana, US
- Mary Cecilia Maher (1799–1878), New Zealand nun, teacher and social worker
