= Patrick O'Reilly (priest) =

Father Patrick O'Reilly 1843–1914

Personal details
- Born: 1843 Rosscarbery, County Cork; Ireland
- Died: 25 August 1914 Dunedin; New Zealand
- Resting place: Otahuhu

Patrick O'Reilly (1843–1914) was a Catholic priest and educationalist in the Diocese of Auckland, New Zealand.

== Early life ==
He was born in Rosscarbery, County Cork, Ireland in 1843 and was brought by his parents to Auckland in 1852. He was educated in Auckland at the primary school attached to St Patrick's Cathedral and at St Peter's School (Auckland's first Catholic secondary school for boys). He trained for the Catholic priesthood at St Mary's Seminary.

== Priesthood ==
O"Reilly was ordained a priest on 24 February 1866 and was one of the first Catholic priests to have received most of his training for the ministry in New Zealand. O'Reilly's major pastoral efforts were in Coromandel (where in 1864 he baptised Matthew Brodie, who was later the first New Zealand-born Catholic priest and who became the second Bishop of Christchurch) and Thames where he built churches and established schools which were "well-run institutions ... models of their kind". O'Reilly assisted Bishop Edmund Luck in reorganising Catholic education in the Diocese after the passage of the Education Act 1977 which excluded the possibility of public financial assistance for privately run schools. O'Reilly was appointed the first Diocesan Inspector of Catholic Schools and was raised to the rank of Monsignor for this work. O'Reilly was administrator of St Patrick's Cathedral for a period from 1899 before returning as parish priest to Thames where he served until 1908. After some years of ill-health, he died in Dunedin on 25 August 1914.
