= Church of St. John the Baptist, Parnell =

Historic church in Auckland, New Zealand

Church of St John the Baptist
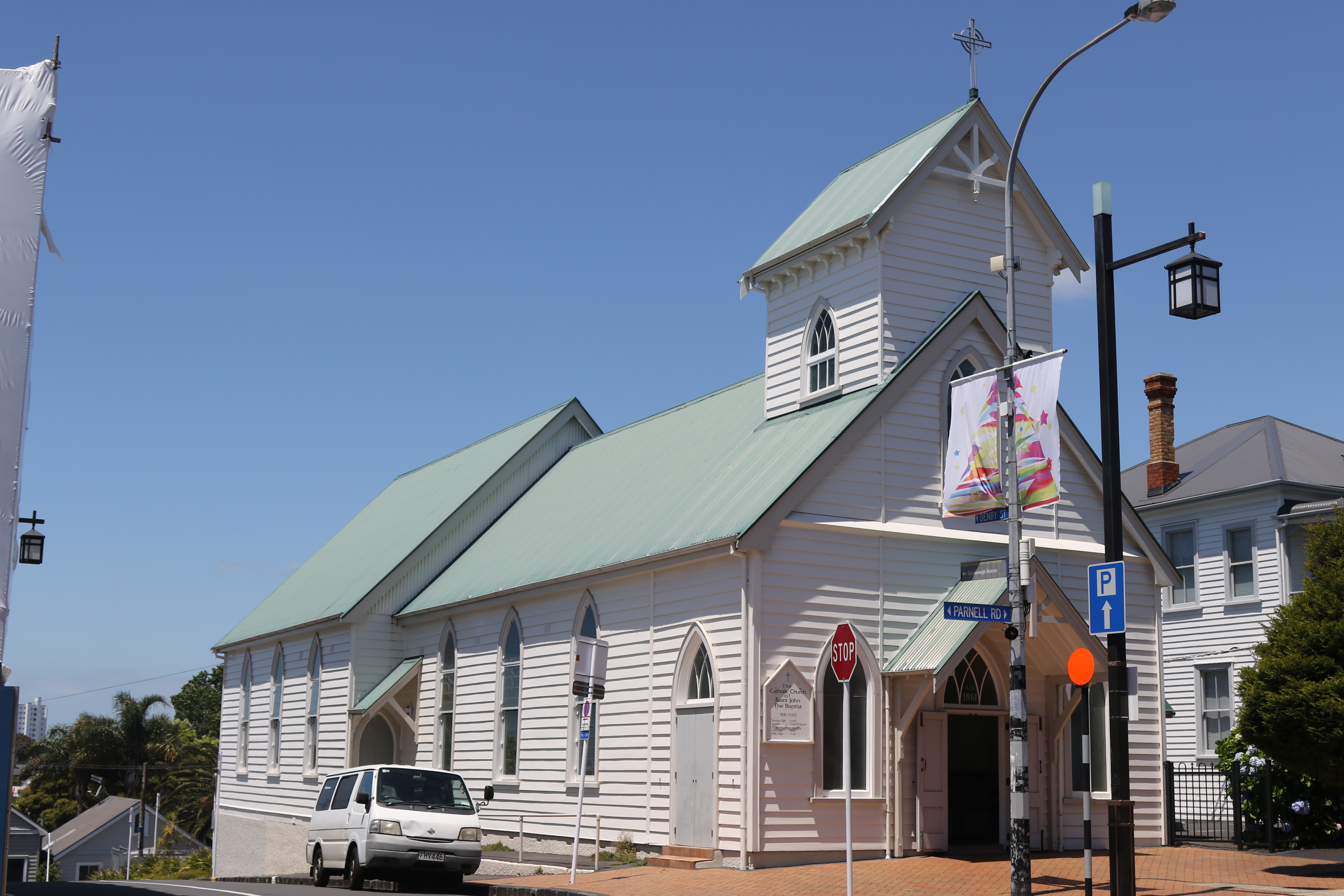
- Church of St John the Baptist
- 36°51′18″S 174°46′50″E
- Location: Parnell, Auckland
- Country: New Zealand
- Denomination: Catholic
- Website: parnellcatholic.org.nz

History
- Status: Church
- Founded: October 1860
- Founder: Father Michael O'Hara
- Dedication: John the Baptist
- Dedicated: 12 May 1861 by Bishop Pompallier

Architecture
- Functional status: Active
- Architect: Edward Mahoney
- Architectural type: Church
- Style: Gothic Revival

Administration
- Diocese: Auckland

Clergy
- Priest: Father Stephen Berecz

Heritage New Zealand – Category 1
- Designated: 1 March 2012
- Reference no.: 562

Church of St. John the Baptist is a heritage-listed Roman Catholic church located in Parnell, a suburb of Auckland, in the North Island of New Zealand. Designed by the architect Edward Mahoney, the church was opened in 1861 by Bishop Jean Francois Baptiste Pompallier, the founder of the Catholic Church in New Zealand. Historically it has supported a convent for the Sisters of Mercy and a school, and as of 2023 continues as a functioning parish in the Roman Catholic Diocese of Auckland.

The church building was listed as a Category I Historic building by Heritage New Zealand in 2012.

== Early history ==
The church is sited on a part of land purchased by an Anglican Missionary Robert Maunsell, who in June 1858, sold it to Pompallier to be used for religious and educational purposes. Shortly after purchasing the land, Pompallier became the Bishop of Auckland and Father Michael O'Hara, the priest until 1862, established the church, with a confirmation in October 1860 that it would be named in honour of the Bishop's patron saint.

Before the church was built, there was a Catholic primary school on a site next door, run initially by lay staff but later by the Sisters of Mercy.

The architect Edward Mahoney designed the church using what has been called a "pared-back Gothic Revival style...[notable for]...well-lit interiors and the use of cross-braced roof trusses". The church, initially a small timber building with a tower and spire, was opened on 12 May 1861 by Pompallier. At that time another wooden building was constructed next to the church as a convent for the Sisters of Mercy who ran a school from the premises. The enlargement of the church in 1898 included a private chapel for the nuns. In 1903, the original convent was replaced by a larger structure with reception rooms, a refectory and quarters for nuns.

== Notable clergy ==
The church was originally a chapel of ease attached to the cathedral, with Father O'Hara as the priest, until 8 December 1862 when it became a formal parish run by the Franciscans for eleven years. Following the Franciscans, Msgr. Henry Fynes was appointed the first diocesan priest. He ran the parish from 1873 to 1887 and was noted for his conciliatory approach toward the controversial debate at the time regarding the proposed New Zealand Government Education Act which aimed to make education secular. Local newspapers reported frequently on the high profile of the church and the enthusiastic participation of the parishioners. At one ceremony to renew Baptismal Vows, it was said that "not only seats, but the aisle and doorways were thronged, and numbers stood around outside the door", and following a celebration of High Mass there by the Archbishop in 1880, another article reported that "the church was crowded to its utmost limits, and seats had to be laid through the aisle to proved extra accommodations". One year the Christmas decorations of the Church were said to be "most pleasing, full and appropriate...elaborate, but in every way becoming within the sanctuary". When Fynes died in 1887, the New Zealand Herald appended a brief biographical sketch of the man they said was "possessed in no ordinary degree of soundness of judgement, devotion to duty, and a happy disposition of mind".

There was a period of short-serving clergy until 1891 when the Rev. Father Lenihan took over and was pastor until 1896. During his time the interior walls of the church were painted in a "light blue colour", noted as one of many improvements made by "the indefatigable parish priest, the Rev. Father Lenihan". After Rev. Joseph Kehoe took over as parish priest in 1896, there were extensions to the church, with the New Zealand Tablet noting on 13 October 1898 that "with a befitting ceremony the new Church of St John the Baptist in Parnell was opened...a credit alike to the energetic priest in charge, Father Kehoe, and his good people who have worked together long and zealously towards this successful confirmation". A new presbytery was later constructed and the old convent was demolished to be rebuilt in 1908. Kehoe died in 1914 and an obituary in the Taranaki Herald noted that even during his sickness, he was "he was unremitting and full of zeal in the discharge of his priestly duties..[and]...in his day he was an able preacher and a very accomplished musician".

The first New Zealand-born parish priest was Rev. Matthew Brodie who only served briefly before becoming Bishop of Christchurch in 1915. Monsignor Jeremiah Cahill, parish priest from 1916 to 1925, was known as "a genial and sporting Irishman and a great personality", and is noted as a life member of the Auckland Marist Brothers Old Boys Rugby Club. During Cahill's time a brick school building was erected.

Rev. John Brennan was parish priest from 1925 to 1930 followed by Monsignor Michael Edge who served in the role from 1930 until his death in 1942, and was remembered for his "Tridentine altar arrangements...[which]...were to become the swan song of the long-standing liturgical order". In 1931, the 70th anniversary of the church was celebrated and modifications were noted as including new "Gothic arches, columns and pelmets...[and]...altar rails...[which]...emphasised the importance of the sanctuary in the existing liturgical order". Monsignor Leonard Buxton was the parish priest from 1942 to 1949 and he is credited with modifications of the convent building, enlargement of the chapel and the reconstruction of the entrance foyer.

Father Edward Forsman, who was parish priest from 1949 until his retirement in 1974, has been described as "a man of genial temperament generous in hospitality, of musical and poetic gifts, and accomplished preacher and a born raconteur...also a scholar, philosopher and theological of some distinction". During the early period of Forsman's time at the church, the nuns at the convent continued to run a successful Catholic school, but in 1964 the Sisters of Mercy withdrew from Parnell and the school at the rear of church and convent was closed. Forsman was said to have been upset by losing the school and at the same time was unsettled by the requirements of the post-Vatican II liturgical changes although he did cooperate with them by upgrading the altar and lectern.

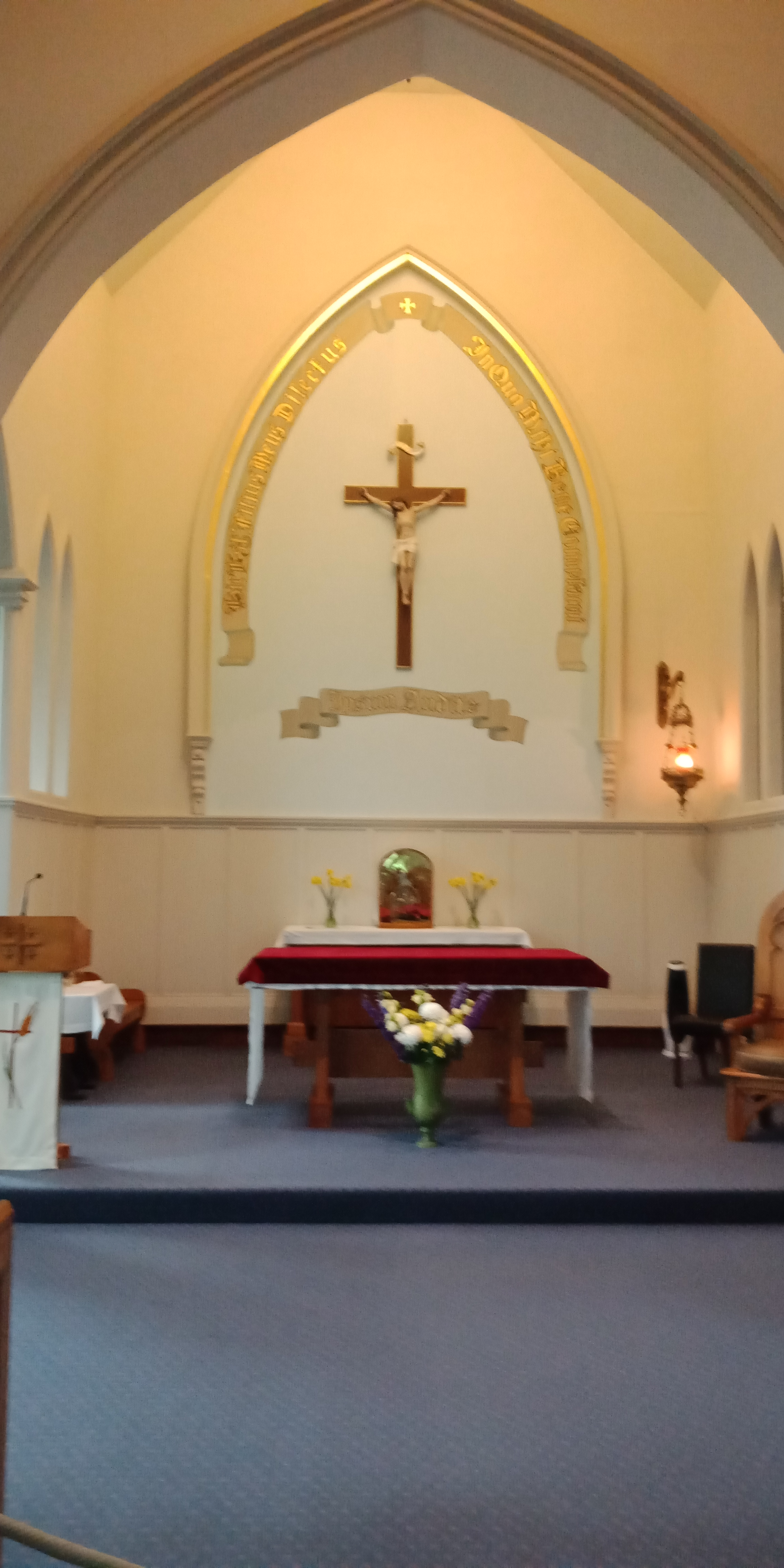
The church altar

In 1980 when the Marist Fathers took responsibility for the parish it was run by initially by Rev. Sloane, followed by Rev. Fitzpatrick. In 1989 the Marist Fathers left Parnell and the status of the parish once again became diocesan under the care of Father Kevin Hackett. In 1997 the church was completely refurbished and from 2001 the convent building has been used as commercial office space. Father Chris Denham came to Parnell from Holyname Parish, Puhoi and served until 2021 when he was appointed Dean of St Patrick's Cathedral, Auckland. In March 2021, Father Francis Poon took over as parish administer and priest, and as of 2023, Father Stephen Berecz is the parish priest.

== Local community ==
The church is situated in Parnell, an inner suburb of Auckland, and is close to other buildings with heritage status, including Ewelme Cottage, Kinder House, St Stephens Chapel and St Mary's Church formerly known as the St Mary's Cathedral, Auckland.

In 1986, one historian in regard to the place of the church within Parnell concluded "[that] aggiornamento has been accomplished without the usual recourse to an apparatus of lay councils and conferences; nor the voices of theological liberalism and neo-Modernism and politicising much heard in the precincts". On 12 June 2011, the church celebrated its 150th anniversary and the Parish priest Monsignor Kevin Hackett said he had seen many changes with major repairs and renovations of the building over the years and the church was still an important part of the Parnell community concluding "There wouldn't be too many times you come in and no one's there."

Under the legal name of St John the Baptist of Parnell Ecclesiastical Goods Trust, the church was registered as a New Zealand Charity on 30 June 2008.

Developments of buildings within the Parnell area have been problematic at times for the church. In 2009, a local group put a proposal to the council to allow the demolition of a two-story building and construction of one that "would be four storeys high with shops, offices, a cafe and basement car parking for 86 vehicles", and the Parish priest Monsignor Kevin Hackett expressed his concerns about the church being completely shaded in winter, the extra traffic in the small side road and the potential for the site to be destabilised and cause a slip. However while the application was dropped by the Council because of the number of submissions against it, a revised application was considered in 2011. Hackett said that because the developers had not informed the community of its new plans, the church was "not very impressed at all...Last time we went through the process and aired our views. This is all back door stuff".

However, the church does feature in the council's 2019 30-year plan for Parnell, a suburb which the plan says "has been fortunate to have retained many heritage buildings from a range of eras and styles including the Holy Trinity Cathedral, the Jubilee Building, St John the Baptist historic church...[and]...these much-loved buildings and facilities are among the many 'hearts' of Parnell". The plan noted in the forward that: "Looking to the future we want to protect and celebrate Parnell’s historic heritage and express its Māori history", and this is reflected in Objective 5 of the plan to: "Respect, recognise and protect Parnell's historic and cultural heritage and character."

== Heritage registration ==
On 1 March 2012, the New Zealand Historic Places Trust (since renamed as Heritage New Zealand) registered the church and convent as a Category 1 Historic Place. The buildings are said to have historic, social, aesthetic, archaeological and spiritual significance.
