= St Mary's Old Convent Chapel =

Category 1 Historic Place in Auckland

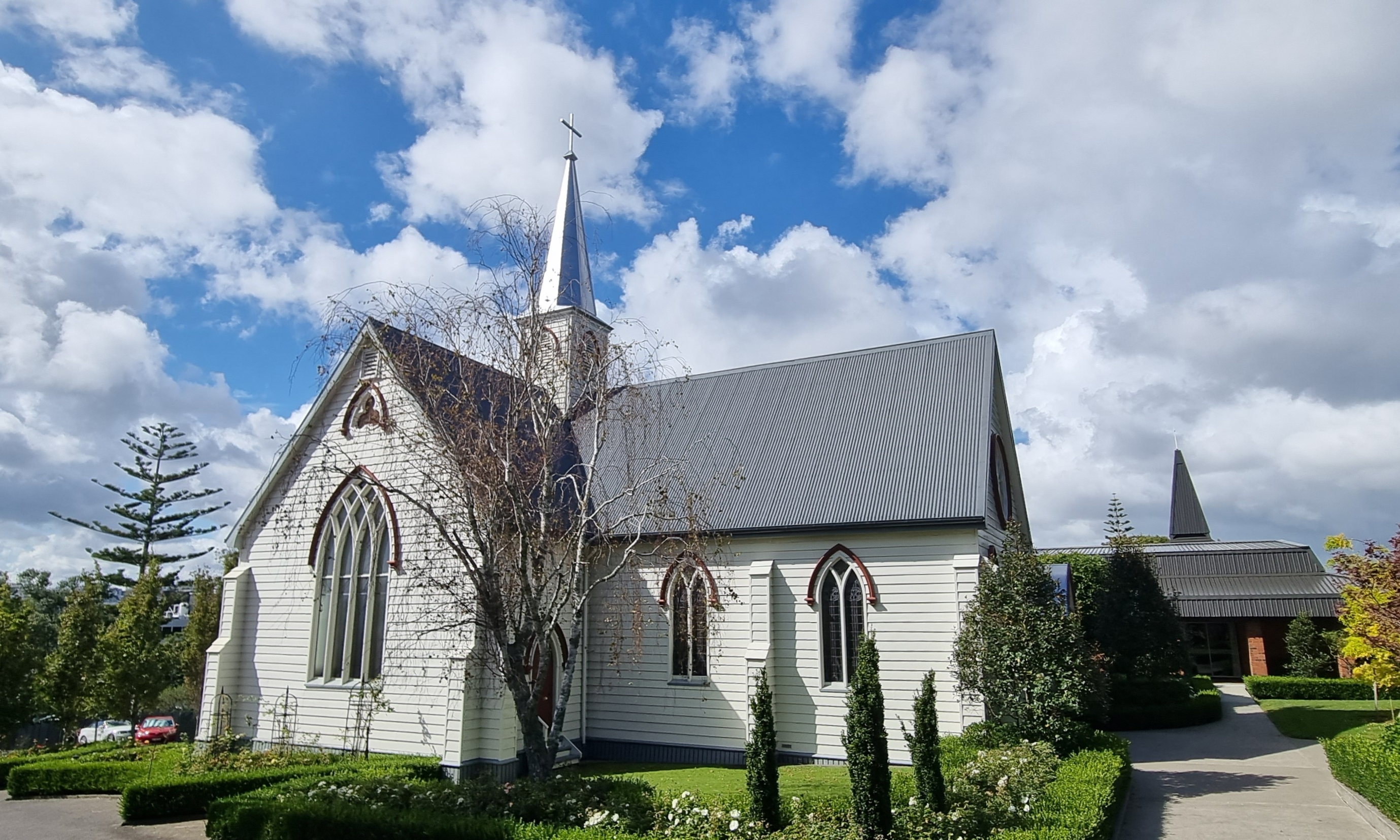
- St Mary's Old Convent Chapel
- Interactive map of St Mary's Old Convent Chapel

General information
- Location: 9-17 New Street, Ponsonby, Auckland
- Coordinates: 36°50′45.01″S 174°44′54.25″E
- Year built: 1865-1866
- Opened: 5 August 1866
- Cost: £1100

Design and construction
- Architect: Edward Mahoney

Heritage New Zealand – Category 1
- Designated: 3 March 2003
- Reference no.: 649

St Mary's Old Convent Chapel is a category 1 historic building in Ponsonby, built in 1865–1866.

== History ==
St Mary's Old Convent Chapel was built for the Sisters of Mercy in 1865–1866 on land purchased by Bishop Jean-Baptiste Pompallier in 1853. It was officially opened on 5 August 1866. Bishop Pompallier held Mass twice a week, until his departure from New Zealand in 1868.

The chapel was central to the convent life and also to the students of St Mary's College, which was constructed in 1864 on the site. The building also served as the parish church for Ponsonby from 1870 to 1886.

It is the only 1860s building still standing on the site that was then known as St Mary's Mount.

== Description ==
The chapel was designed by architect Edward Mahoney in a Gothic Revival style, similar to the convent accommodation that had been built several years prior, and the Bishop's House that would be later built across the road from the chapel. It cost £1100 to build.

The wooden chapel is cruciform with a steeply pitched roof and a central spire. The interior was laid out according to the needs of the religious order, rather than as a parish church, resulting in two rows of stalls made of kauri timber on both sides of the nave facing towards each other, across the central aisle. Above the stalls are the stations of the cross.

Above the altar on the east wall, are stained glass windows, the centrepiece depicting Our Lady of Mercy was given by James Franklin in memory of his sister, Sister Mary Xavier. On either side are images of St Catherine and St Cecilia, patrons of Mother Catherine McAuley and Mother Cecilia Maher.

Very few changes have been made to the chapel, except for the c. 1900 addition of further stalls, to accommodate more people. From 2022-2024, Salmond Reed Architects worked with the McAuley Trust to restore the chapel, supported by an Auckland Council Historic Heritage Grant. Using paint analysis and historical images, they repainted the chapel to align with its assumed original colours. They also repaired the timber joinery and restored the stained glass windows. The restoration was a 2025 Auckland Architecture Awards Winner in the heritage category.

== Gallery ==
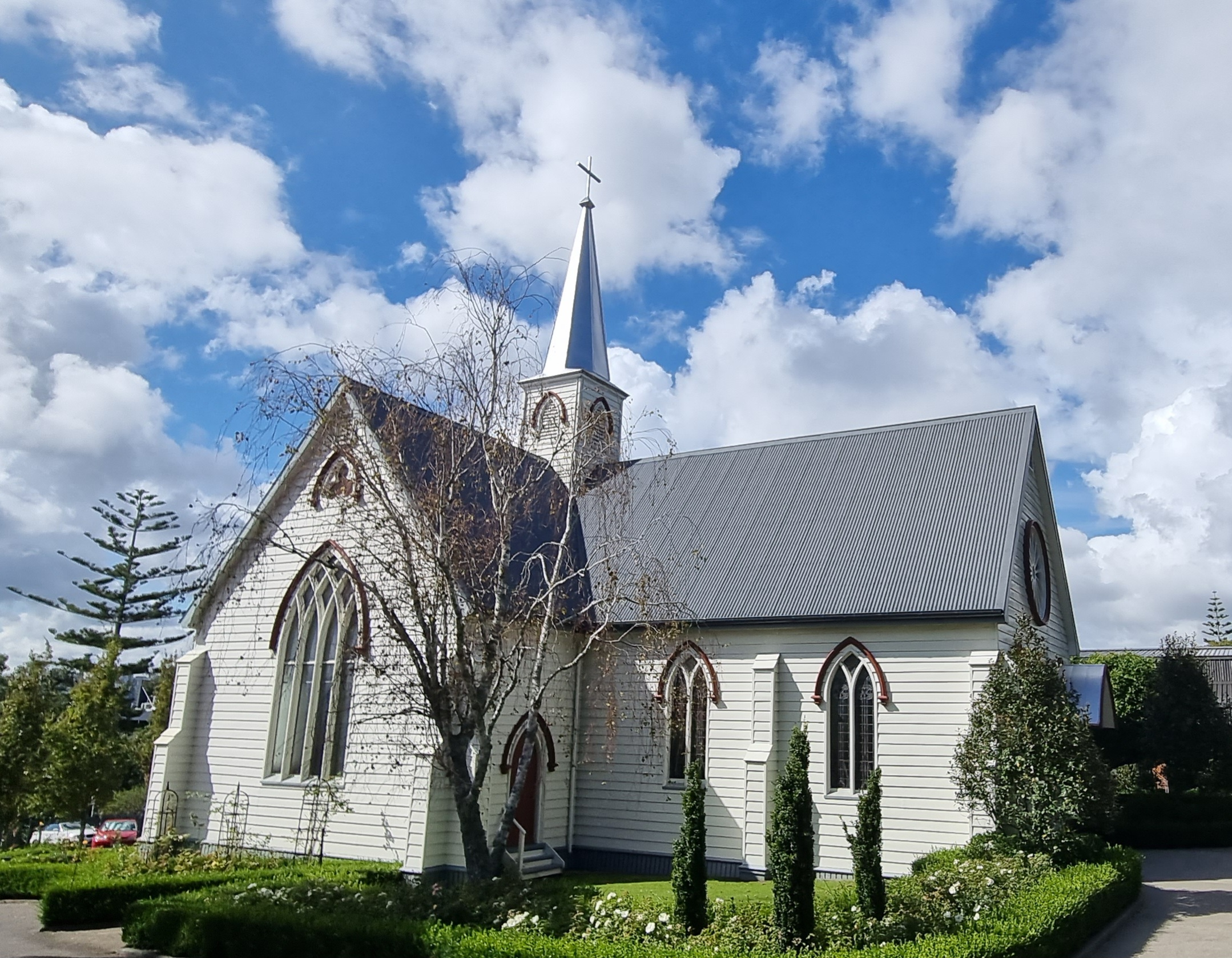
A view of St Mary's Old Convent Chapel from the north-west, near St Mary's College Hall.

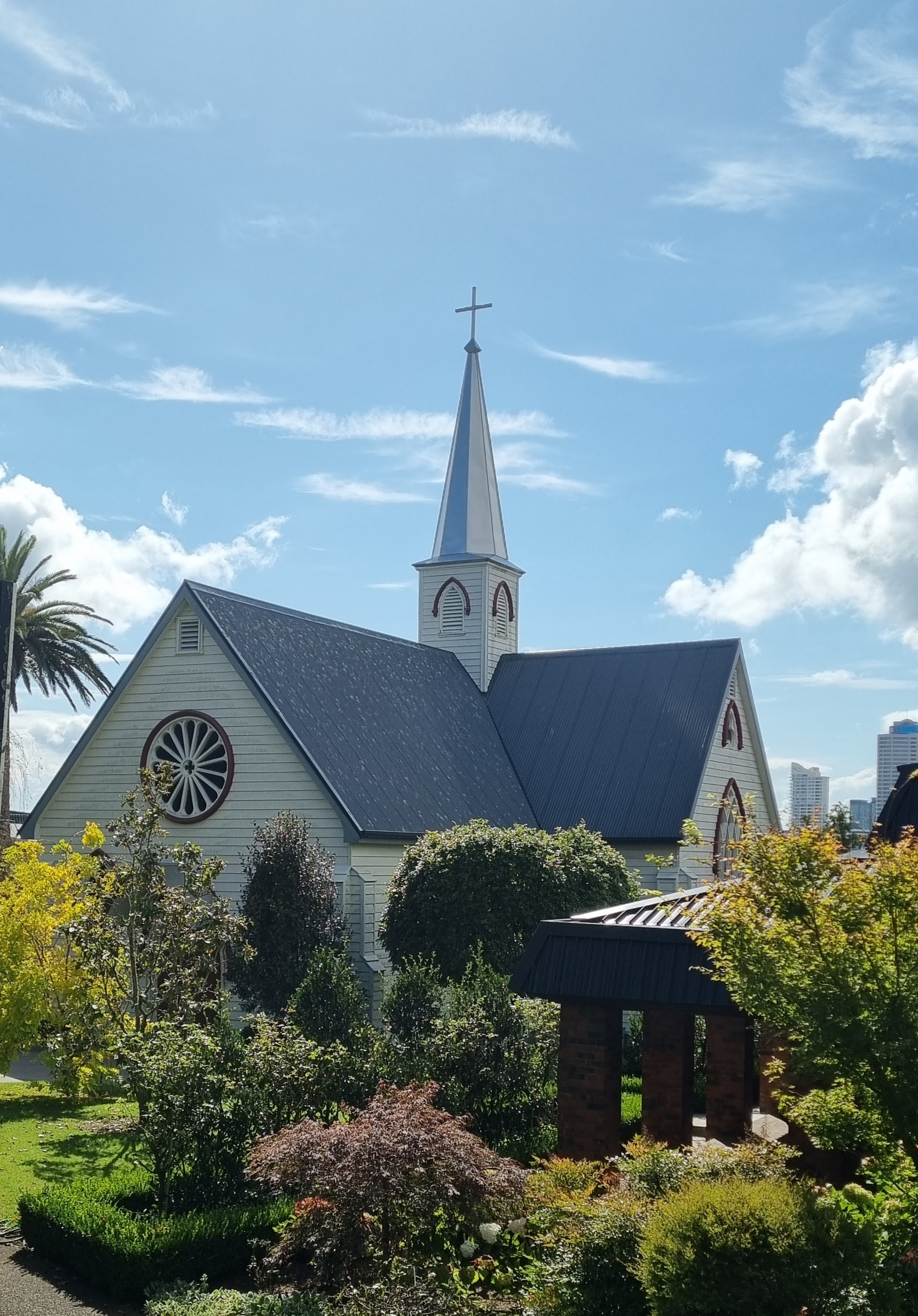
A view of St Mary's Old Convent Chapel from the South-West.

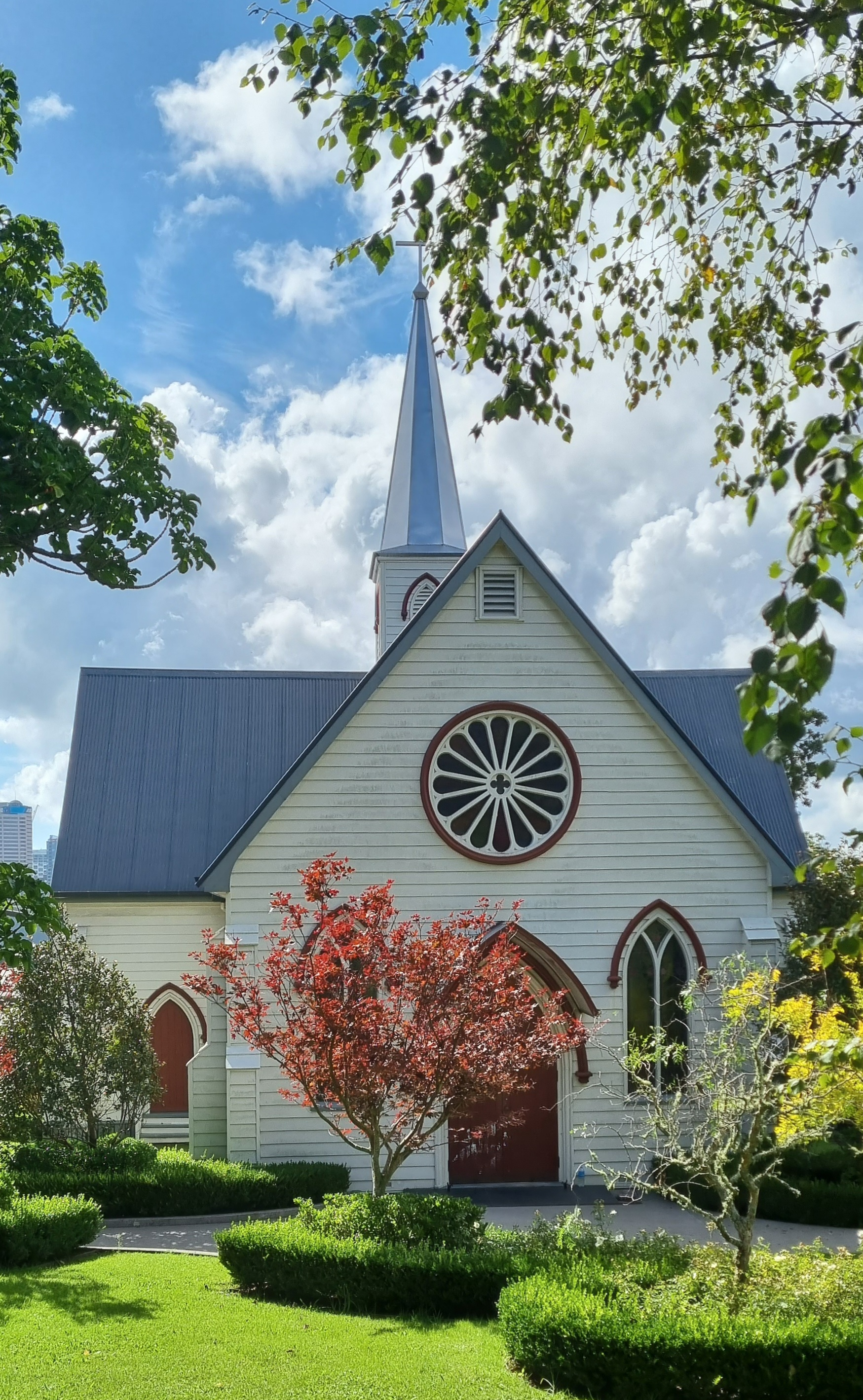
Front entrance of St Mary's Old Convent Chapel.
