= Edward Mahoney =

Irish-born New Zealand architect (1824–1895)

- Born: Edward Mahony; 1824–1825; Ballincollig, County Cork, Ireland
- Died: 28 April 1895 (aged 70–71); Auckland, New Zealand
- Occupation: Architect
- Buildings: Church of St John the Baptist (1861); St Mary's Old Convent Chapel (1866); Church of the Holy Sepulchre (1881)

Edward Mahoney (1824 or 1825 – 28 April 1895) was an Irish-born New Zealand architect, active in Auckland for much of the 1860s to 1880s. His architectural practice, E. Mahoney and Son, in which he was joined by two sons, was responsible for the design of a number of notable buildings, including several churches, in the city up until the 1920s.

== Early life ==
Born in Ballincollig, County Cork, in Ireland, in 1824 or 1825, Edward Mahony's parentage is unknown. A biographer considers it is likely Mahony received some training in architecture from an uncle who worked as an architect in Cork. In late 1854, he, his wife Margaret, and their two children emigrated to Australia, sailing for Adelaide in the Telegraph. Then, in February 1856, he and his family, which now included three children, moved to New Zealand, where they resided in Auckland. It was after his arrival in the city that Mahony added an 'e' to his surname; this was to differentiate himself from a solicitor with the same name. Now known as Edward Mahoney, he set up as a timber merchant and builder.

== Professional practice ==
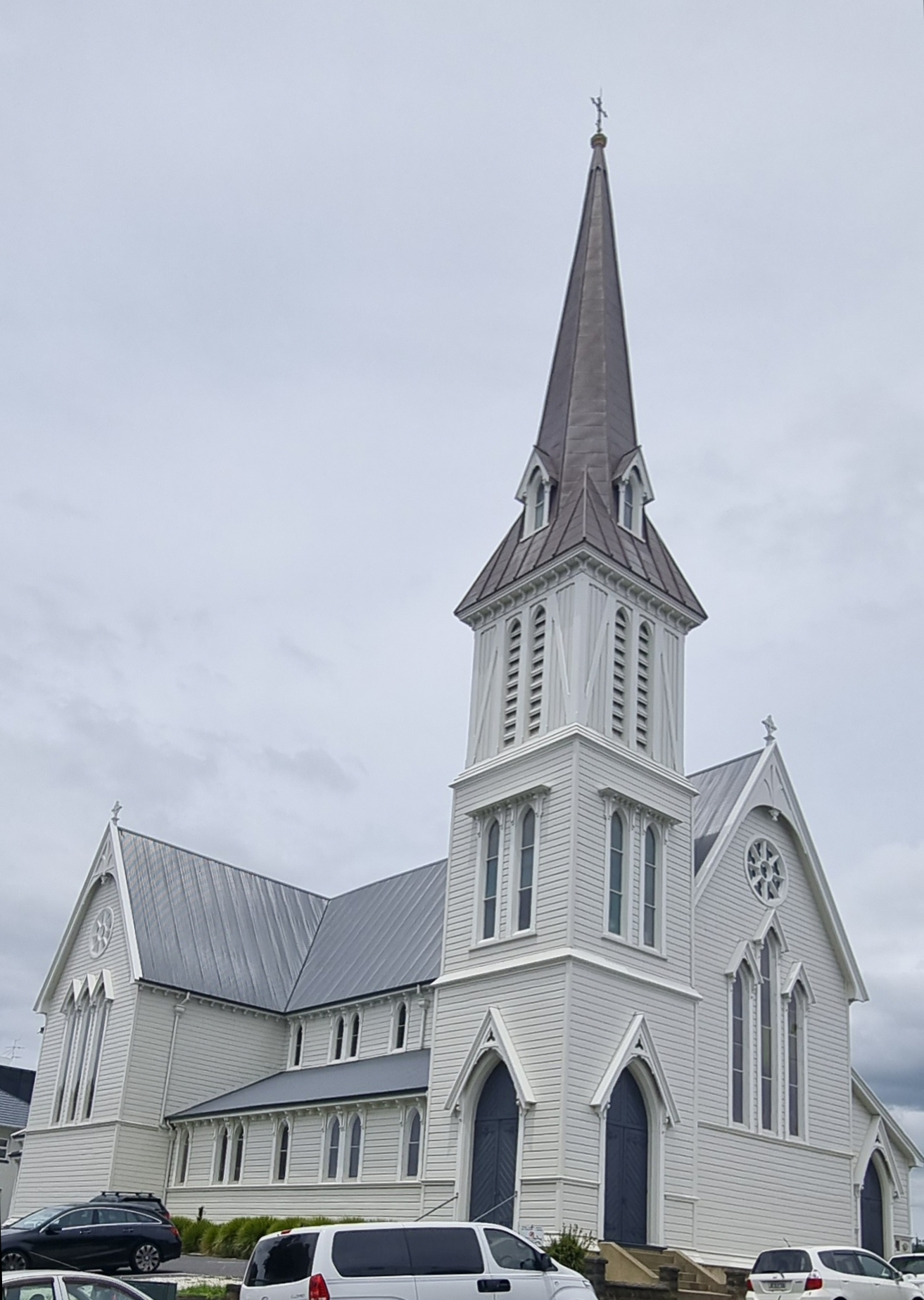
The Church of the Holy Sepulchre in Grafton is one of Mahoney's best known buildings

By 1861 Mahoney was working as an architect, designing the Church of St John the Baptist in Parnell. In Gothic Revival style, the church was opened by Bishop Jean-Baptiste Pompallier and, one of the oldest surviving Catholic churches in the northern part of New Zealand, it was listed as a heritage building in 2012. Another of Mahoney's works was St Mary's Old Convent Chapel in Ponsonby, which was completed in 1866 and is also heritage listed. He also designed a commercical building in Upper Queen Street and an outhouse for a property in St George's Bay.

In 1867, gold was discovered in the Coromandel. This prompted Mahoney to move to Thames for a time and he designed several buildings in the area. Among his work from this period was a theatre and St George's Anglican Church.

Returning to Auckland in 1870, Mahoney established his architectural practice the same year. His output over the next several years resulted in several significant buildings, many of them churches, mostly in Auckland but several elsewhere. One of his best known works was the Church of the Holy Sepulchre in Grafton, completed in 1881 and listed as a heritage building in 2006. Another is St Andrew's Church in Cambridge also completed in 1881 and is heritage listed. Mahoney designed a major addition to St Patrick's Cathedral in Auckland, and this was carried on by his son Thomas, who had joined the business in 1876 at which time it was renamed E. Mahoney and Son.

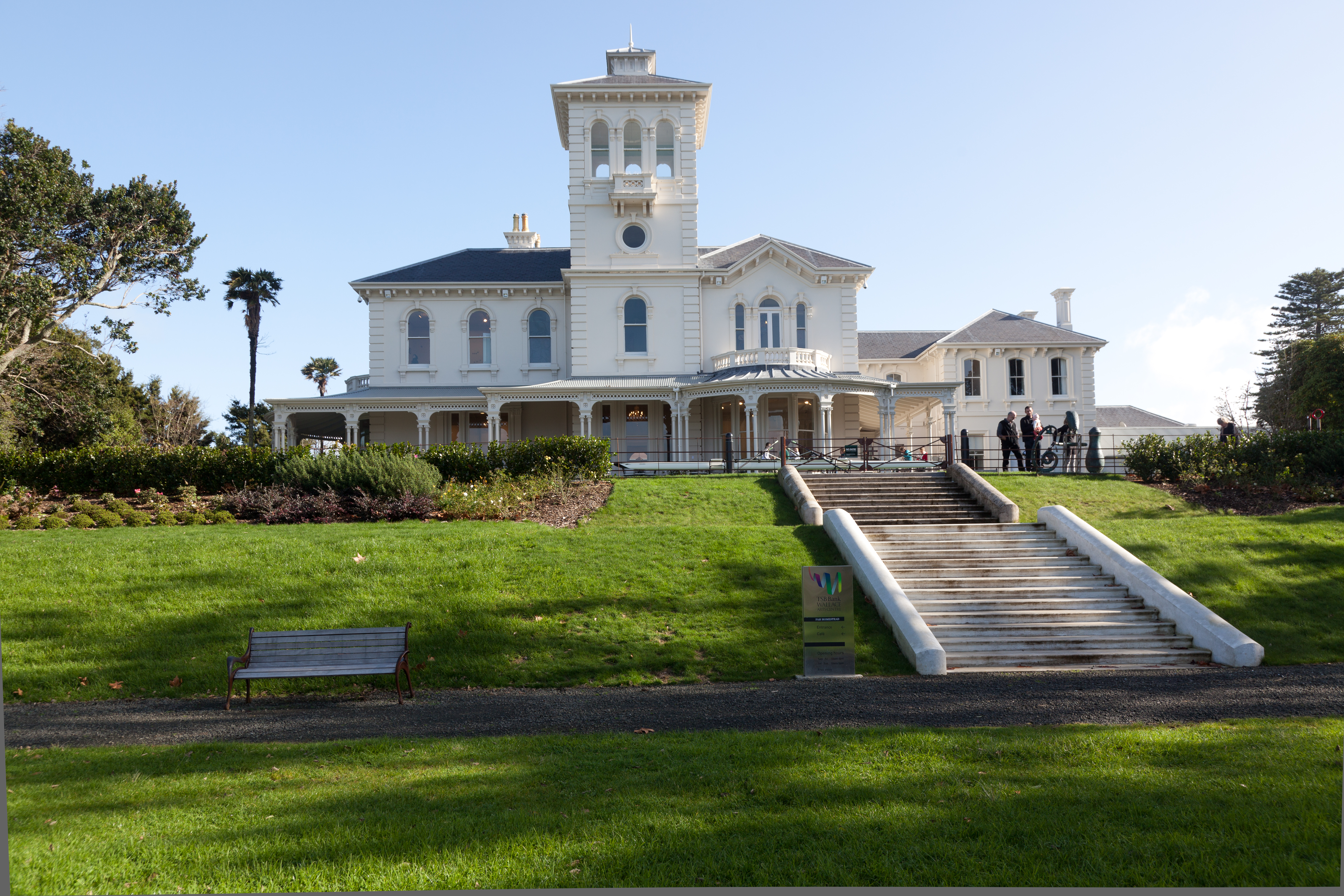
The Pah Homestead was one of Mahoney's residential commissions, completed in 1879

Mahoney also designed residential buildings and one of his most significant is the Pah Homestead, completed in 1879 for a politician and director of the Bank of New Zealand, James Williamson. He was also contracted to the Bank of New Zealand for its branch buildings as well as the Auckland Provincial Education Board. His style was generally dependent on the type of building; most of his ecclesiastical structures were Gothic Revival in appearance while many of his houses were Italianate. The majority of his remaining works were in Free Classical style.

In late 1880, Mahoney was involved in the establishment of the Auckland Institute of Architects. The following year, he was appointed its first honorary treasurer. In 1883 he was appointed the president of the organisation.

== Later life ==
In 1885, Mahoney became ill and this led to his retirement the same year. Thomas continued to run E. Mahoney and Son although he was subsequently joined in the practice by his younger brother Richard.

Mahoney died at his home in Ponsonby, Auckland, on 28 April 1895, survived by four children. He was buried in the Catholic section of the Symonds Street Cemetery. Seven other children and his wife had predeceased him. His sons Thomas and Richard continued the E. Mahoney and Son practice, although the latter died in a drowning accident only two years after the death of his father; this left Thomas as the sole architect in the practice until his own death in 1923. E. Mahoney and Son closed three years later.
