= St Patrick's Cathedral, Auckland =

Historic church in Auckland Central City, New Zealand

St Patrick's Cathedral
- Cathedral of Saint Patrick and Saint Joseph
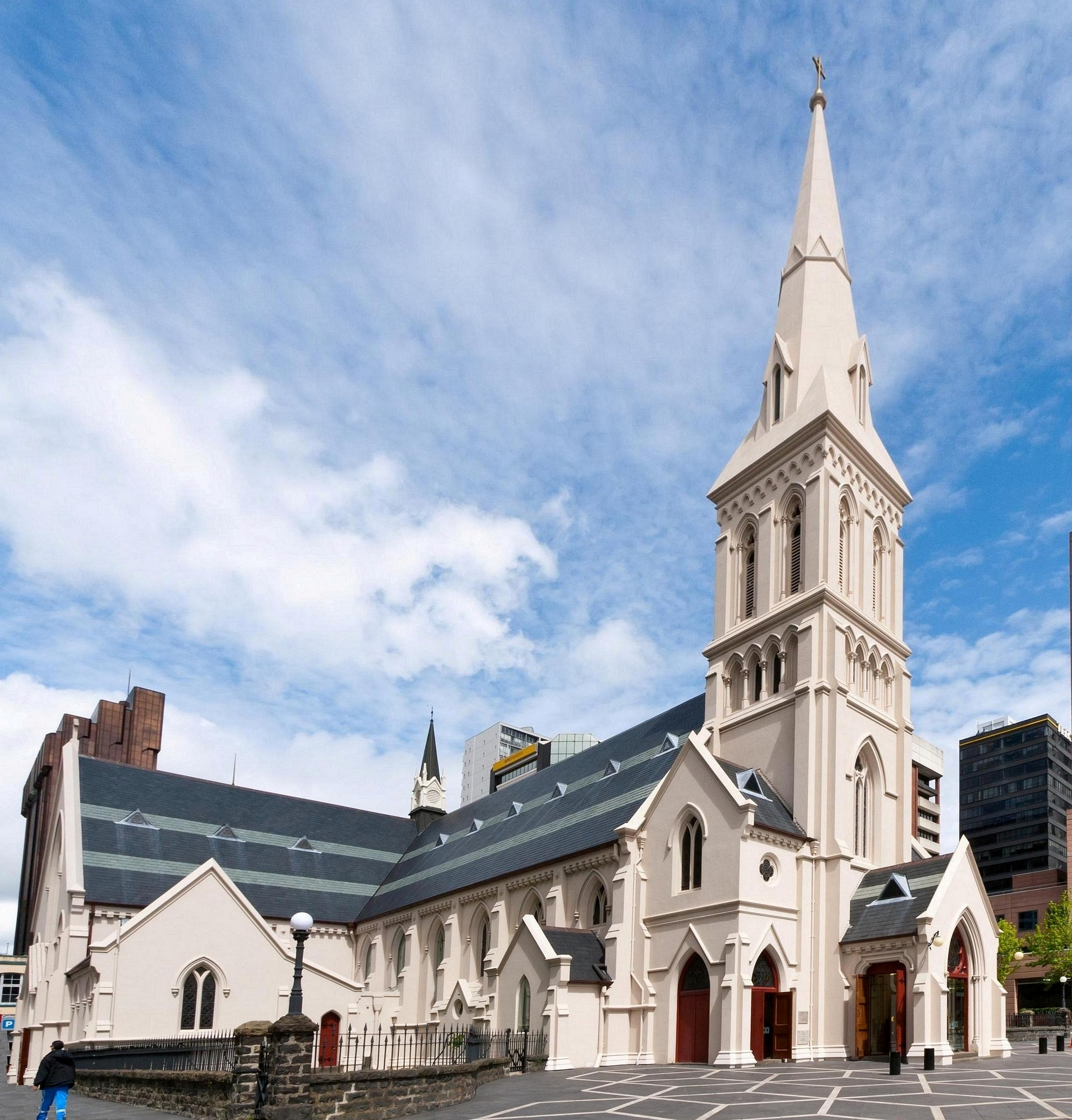
- The cathedral from St Patrick's Square
- St Patrick's Cathedral
- 36°50′47″S 174°45′49″E
- Location: Auckland Central City
- Country: New Zealand
- Denomination: Catholic
- Website: stpatricks.org.nz

History
- Status: Cathedral (since 1848); Church (1848); Chapel (1842 – 1848)
- Founded: 1843; 183 years ago
- Founder: Bishop Jean-Baptiste Pompallier, 1st Bishop of Auckland
- Dedication: Saint Patrick; Saint Joseph
- Dedicated: 23 February 1908
- Consecrated: 1 September 1963

Architecture
- Functional status: Active
- Architects: Edward Mahoney and; Thomas Mahoney
- Architectural type: Church
- Style: Gothic Revival

Administration
- Diocese: Auckland
- Parish: St Patrick's Cathedral

Clergy
- Bishop: Stephen Lowe
- Dean: Fr Craig Dunford

Heritage New Zealand – Category 1
- Designated: 6 September 1984
- Reference no.: 97

The Cathedral of Saint Patrick and Saint Joseph, commonly known as St Patrick's Cathedral, is a heritage-listed Catholic cathedral church in Auckland CBD, situated on the corner of Federal Street and Wyndham St. It is the mother church of the Roman Catholic Diocese of Auckland and the seat of the Bishop of Auckland.

In 1841, the land was acquired by Bishop Jean-Baptiste Pompallier, the first Catholic bishop in New Zealand. A wooden chapel was constructed in 1843, replaced by a stone church in 1848, which was expanded in 1884, and finally replaced with the current cathedral in 1907. The church was designated as a cathedral in 1848, and consecrated in 1963.

The cathedral was registered as a Category I historic place by Heritage New Zealand on 6 September 1984.

== Origins ==
The church is located on the original site granted by the Crown to Jean-Baptiste Pompallier, the first bishop, on 1 June 1841. To minister to the 300 or 400, mostly Irish, Catholics in Auckland in the 1840s, a wooden chapel, clergy house and school room (the first amenity ready for use) were opened and blessed on 29 January 1843. Work soon began on a more permanent church. In 1845, the Australian architect Walter Robinson arrived in Auckland on the encouragement of Pompallier and he was commissioned to design a stone church. The new church was built on the original grant of land and situated on the corner of Chapel Street (now Federal Street) and Wyndham Street.

At first referred to as a chapel, and then a church, St Patrick's became the Catholic cathedral when Auckland was made a diocese in 1848 and when Pompallier, after a visit to France and Rome, returned to Auckland in April 1850 and made the city (then the capital of New Zealand) his headquarters. This simple, plain church, seating 700, was built of locally quarried hammered scoria and had a very substantial appearance similar to others designed by Walter Robinson at this time.

On 4 May 1884, the foundation stone of a new (24.4m by 12.2m) nave was laid, and the old stone church became the transept – the altar, for which a recess was built in 1895, being on the east wall. The architect for this major addition was Edward Mahoney. Between 1884 and 1885, the nave was extended according to Edward's scheme. The nave had a tower, and the bells for this were brought from Rome. The organ was brought from Brompton Oratory, London for £600. The new addition was opened on 15 March 1885 by Archbishop Redwood, the Archbishop of Wellington.

== Current cathedral ==
=== Construction ===
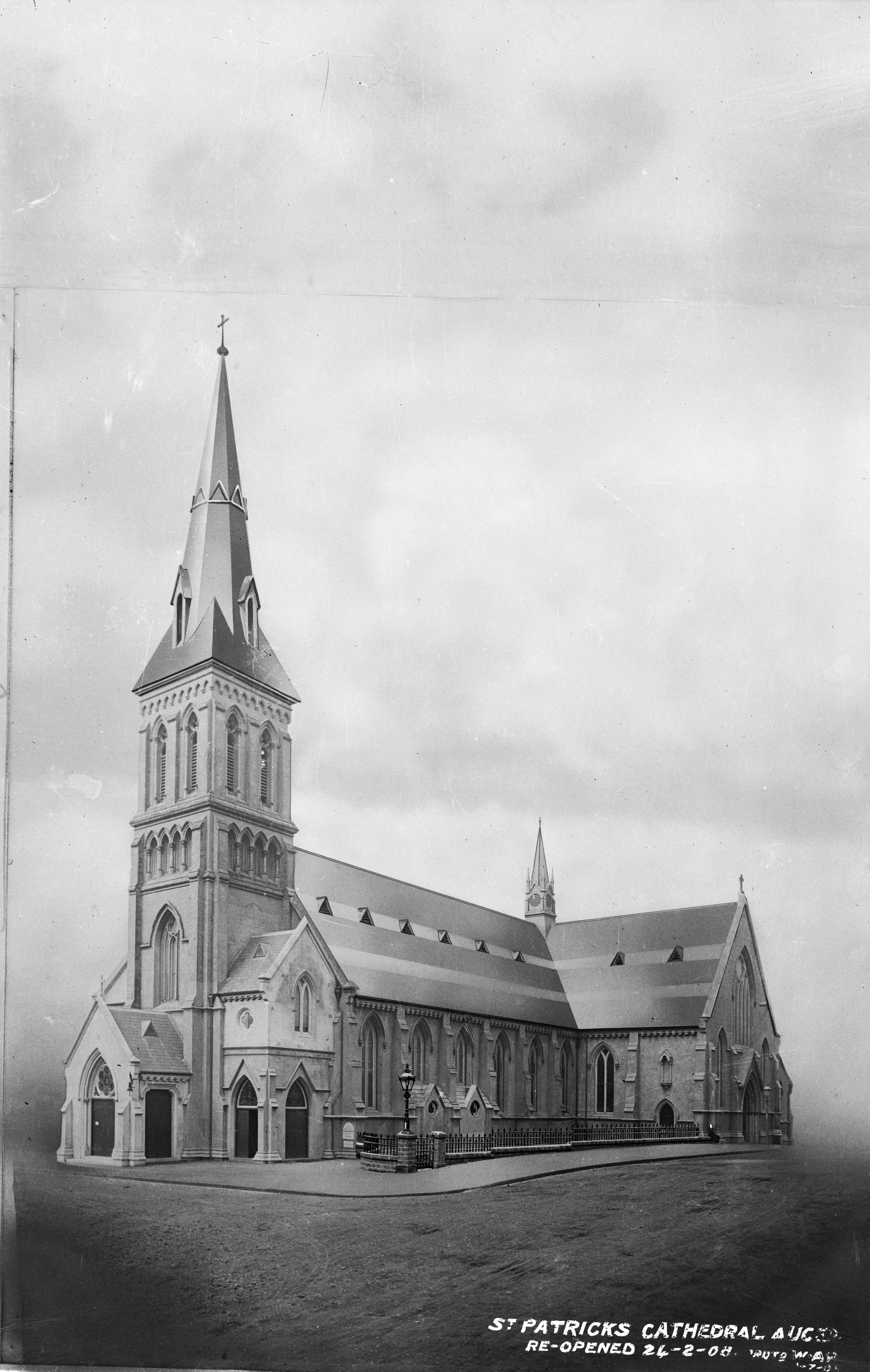
Re-touched photograph, taken by William A Price in 1908

By the turn of the century, the cathedral was once again found to be inadequate in size for the burgeoning population of Auckland. Edward Mahoney's son and architectural partner, Thomas Mahoney, drafted plans for the expansion of the stone church with expanded transepts. In 1907, the cathedral was completed with further extension of the nave (by 12.2 metres), the addition of a sanctuary, the construction of four sacristies and two side chapels, and the addition of three ample entrance porches (one constituting the baptistry). On 23 February 1908, the newly reconstructed building – the present St Patrick's Cathedral – was opened, in the presence of a capacity congregation of 1,300, by Cardinal Francis Moran, the Archbishop of Sydney.

=== Consecration and restoration ===
On 1 September 1963, St Patrick's Cathedral, free of debt and built in permanent materials, was solemnly consecrated by Archbishop James Liston.

A major restoration programme was completed in 2007. This involved a complete reordering of the interior of the cathedral including the transformation of the chancel area into a Blessed Sacrament chapel and the placing on the side altars of icon-style paintings of the Blessed Virgin Mary and the Holy Family with high altar replaced by a large raised apron containing altar, bishop's throne, rostrum and baptismal font (with water permanently flowing towards the north). Another feature in the cathedral is a silk tapestry that has hung on the west wall of the north transept since 1989.

== Connections ==
- A grapevine outside the cathedral is believed to have come from a vine brought to New Zealand by Bishop Pompallier.
- In 1940, after a requiem Mass at Sacred Heart Basilica, Wellington, and a train journey, the body of New Zealand Prime Minister Michael Joseph Savage, who had died in office, rested in the cathedral before being interred at Bastion Point where the Savage Memorial was constructed.
- St Patrick's Cathedral (especially its spire) was the climactic location in the 1988 Vincent Ward-directed film The Navigator: A Medieval Odyssey.
- George Michael Lenihan OSB (1858–1910), fifth Bishop of Auckland (1896–1910), and John Mackey (1918–2014), ninth Bishop of Auckland (1974–1983), are buried in the Cathedral

== Administrators ==
The Administrators of the Cathedral have included the following priests:

- John Baptist Petit-Jean (1842–1845)
- John Forest (1845–1850)
- Henry Fynes (1850–1852)
- James McDonald (1852–1869)
- Michael O'Hara (1869–1871)
- Walter McDonald (1871–1886)
- Patrick Costello (1887)
- Victor Thomas (1888)
- James Hackett (1889–1895)
- W J Madden (1895–1897)
- Thomas Mulvihill (1897–1898)
- Patrick O'Reilly (1899–1901)
- James Patterson (1901–1905)
- Henry Holbrook (1905–1913)
- Matthew Brodie (1913–1915)
- Jeremiah Cahill (1915–1916)
- William Murphy (1916–1918)
- John Brennan (1918–1919)
- William Forde (1919–1921)
- John Brennan (1921–1923)
- John Bradley (1924–1925)
- Leonard Buxton (1925–1942)
- Adrian Curran (1942–1970)
- Brian Arahill (1971– 1988)
- (????)
- Michael Bancroft (1998–1999)
- Bernard Kiely (1999–2017)
- Peter Tipene (2017–2021)
- Christopher Denham (2021–2025)
- Craig Dunford (2025-present)

== Music directors ==
- Douglas Mews (1970–1982)

== Gallery ==
=== Exterior ===
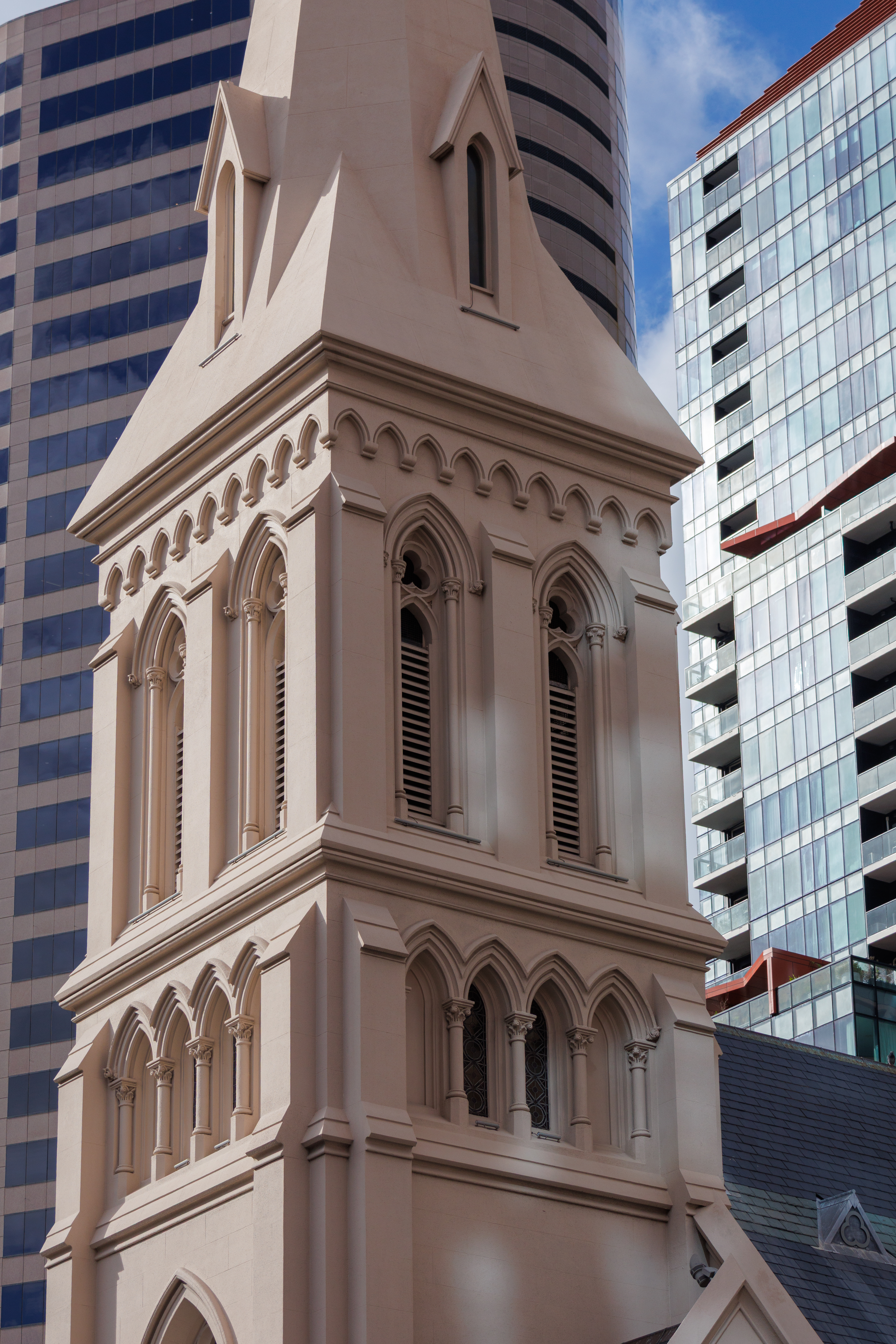
Belfry

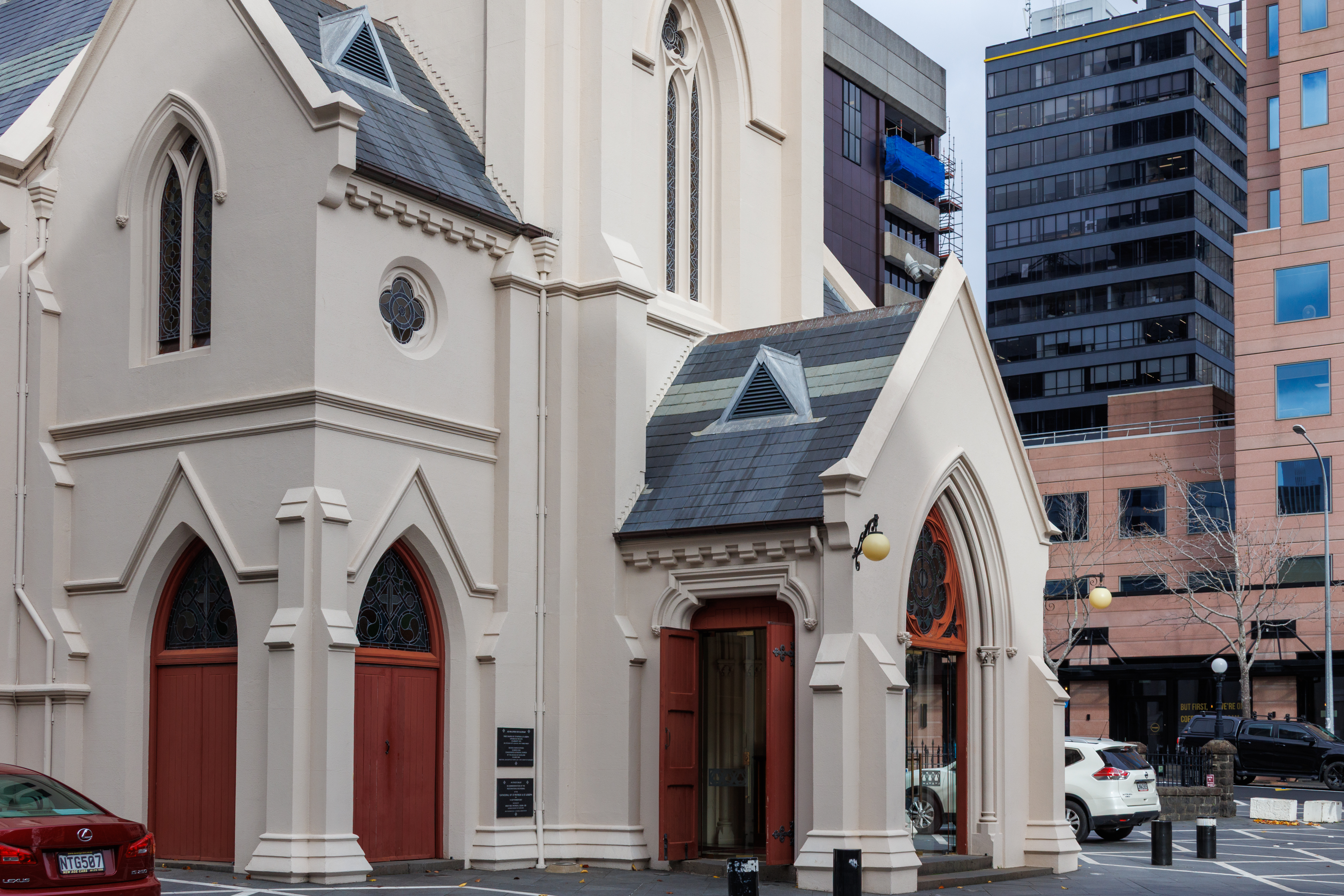
Main entrance, side view

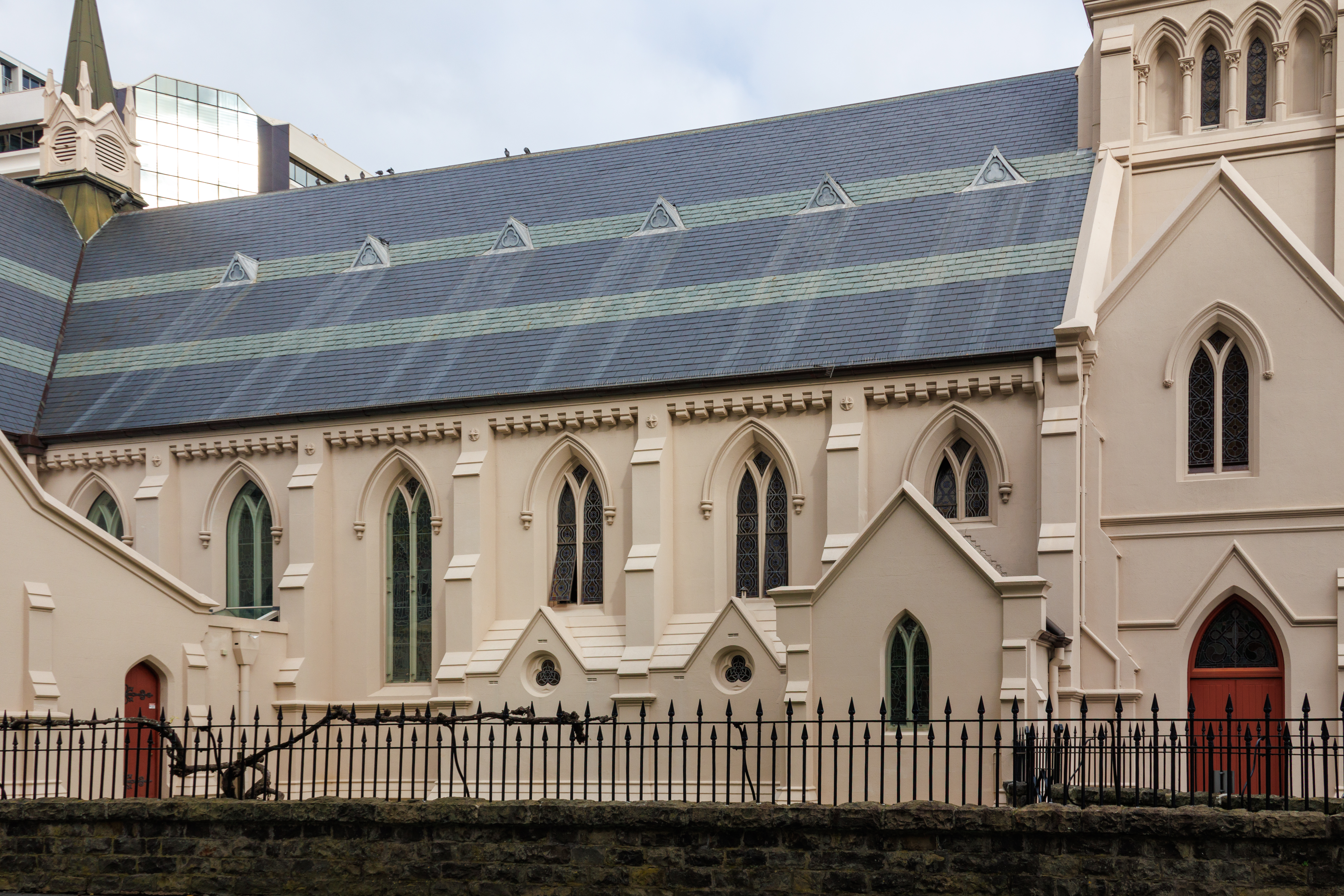
Western part

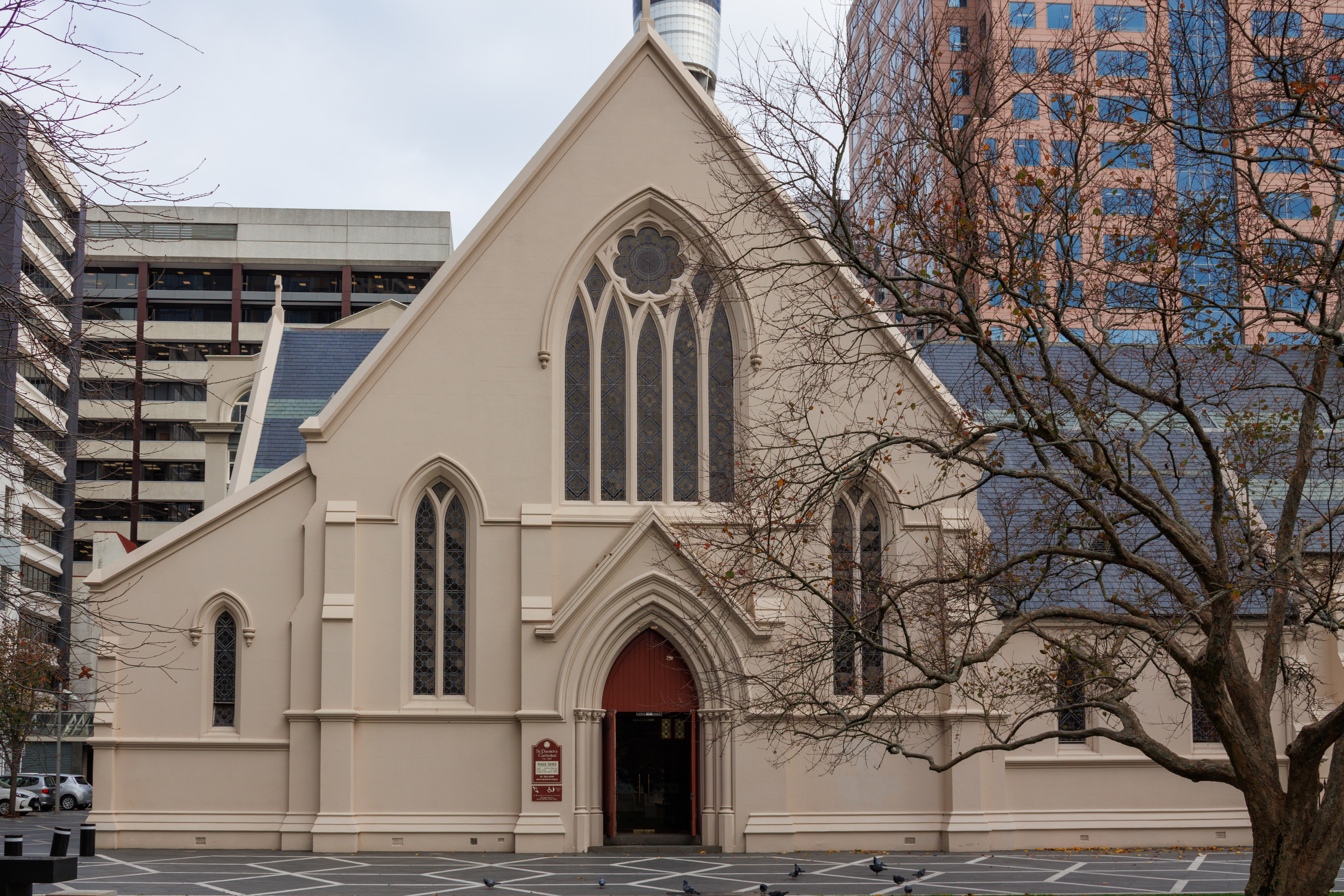
The north transept

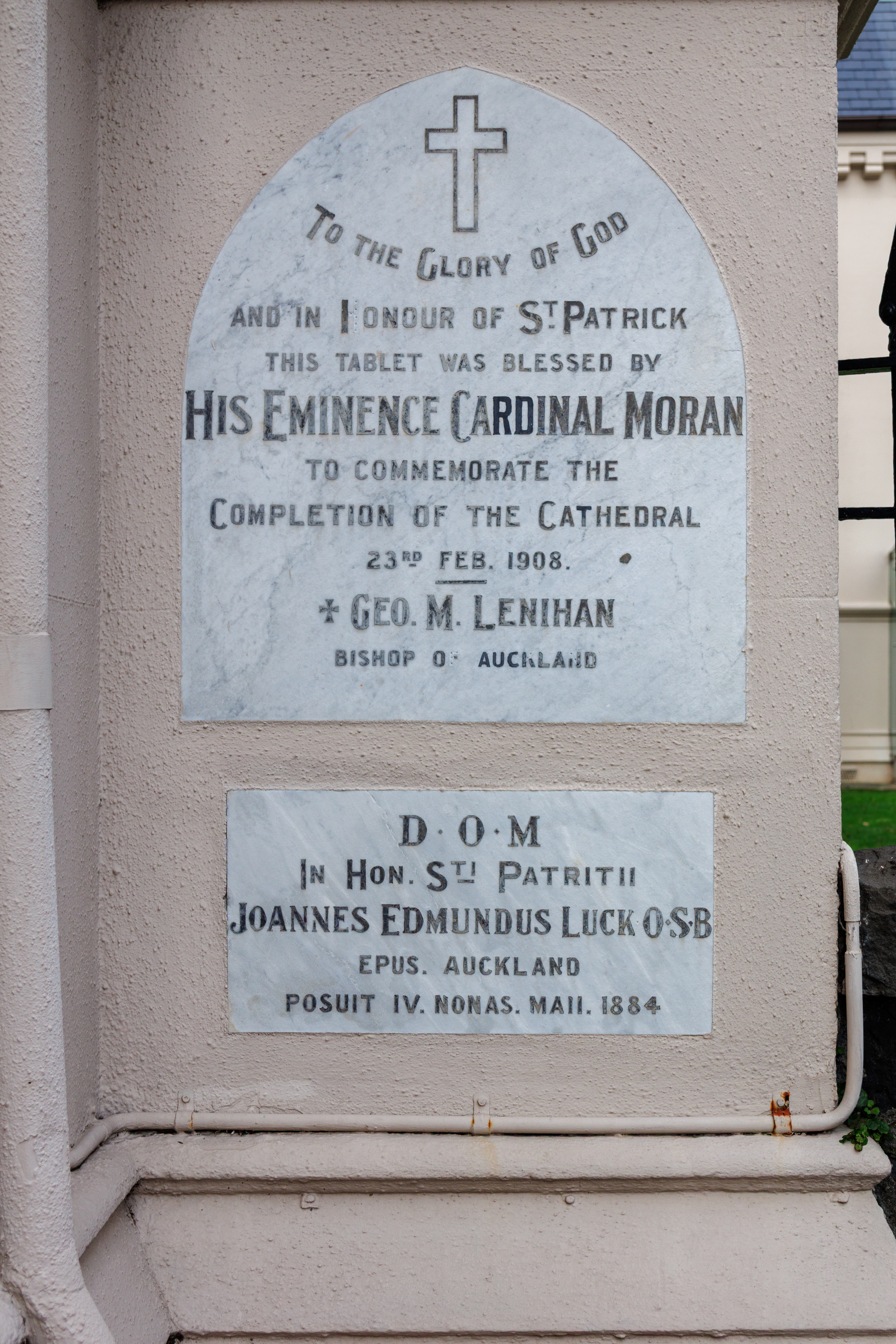
Foundation stone and completion plaque

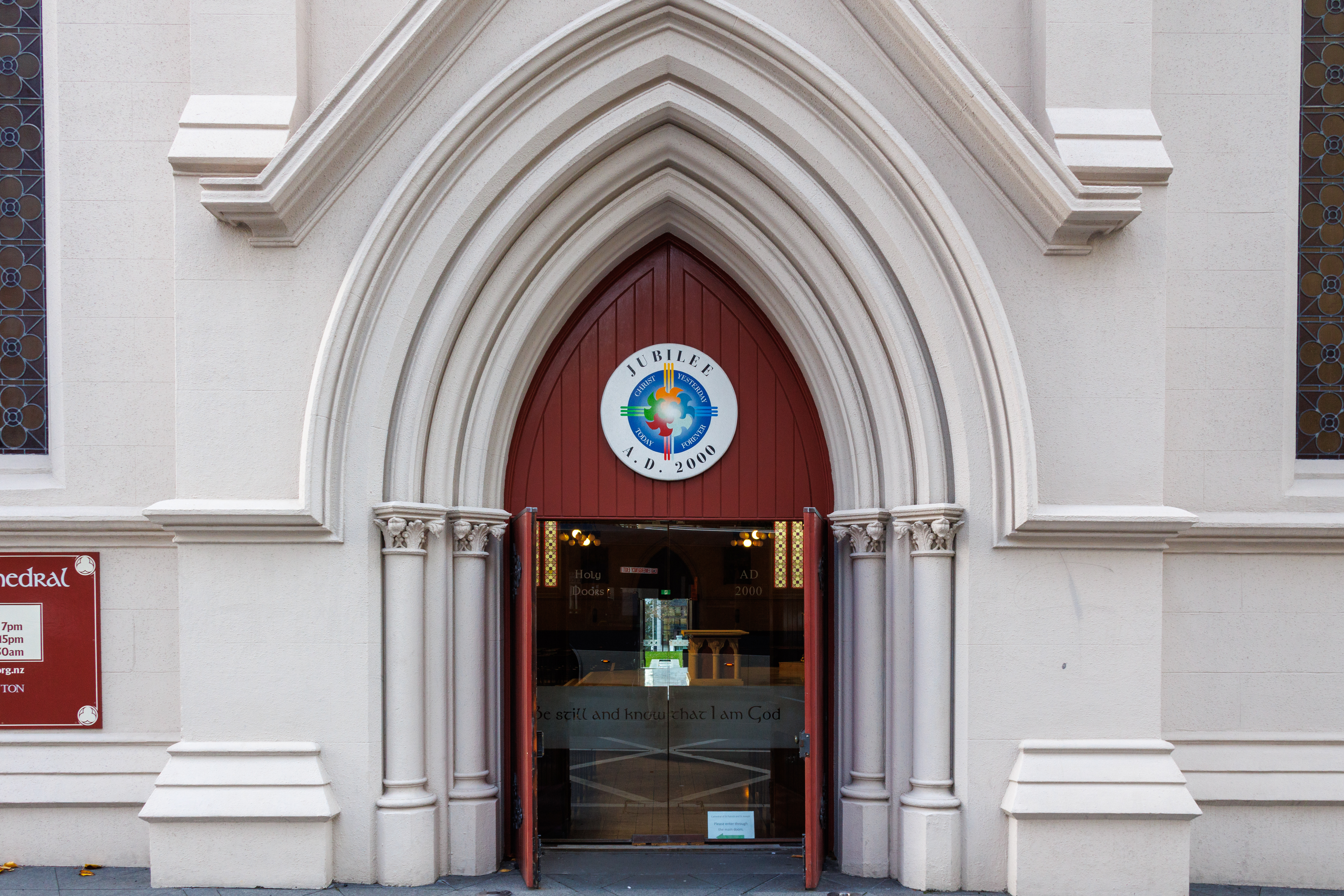
The South transept entrance

=== Interior ===
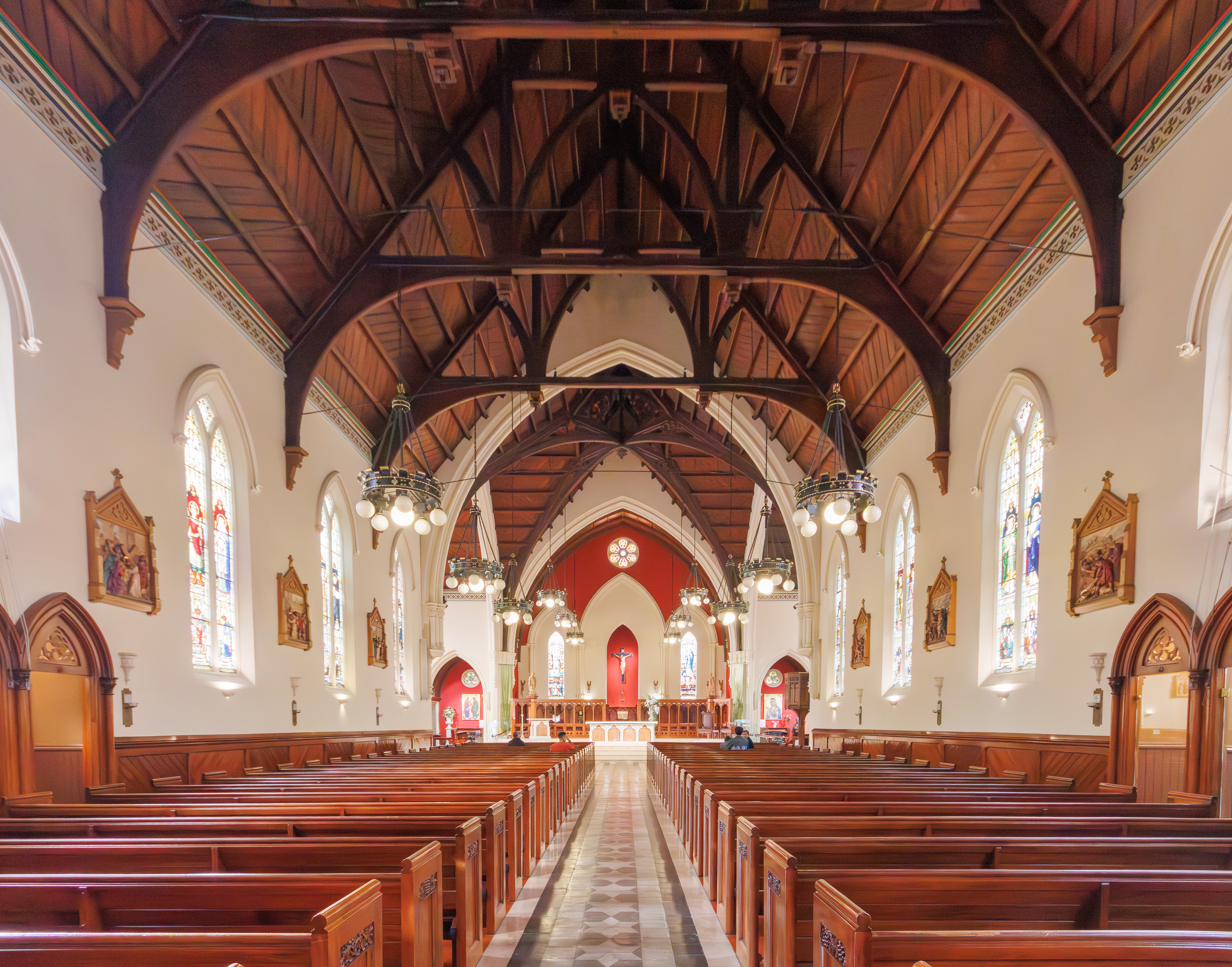
Nave

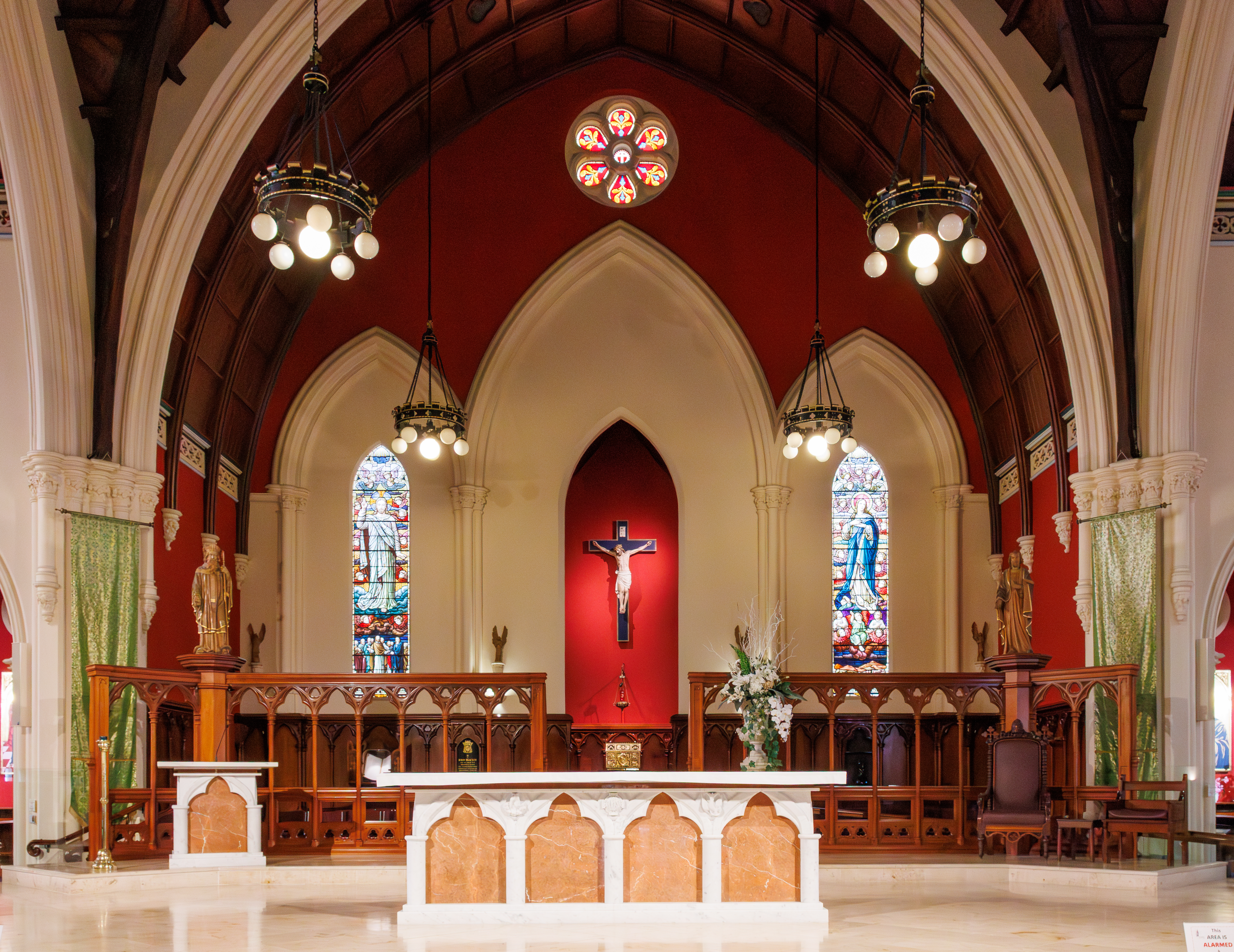
Sanctuary

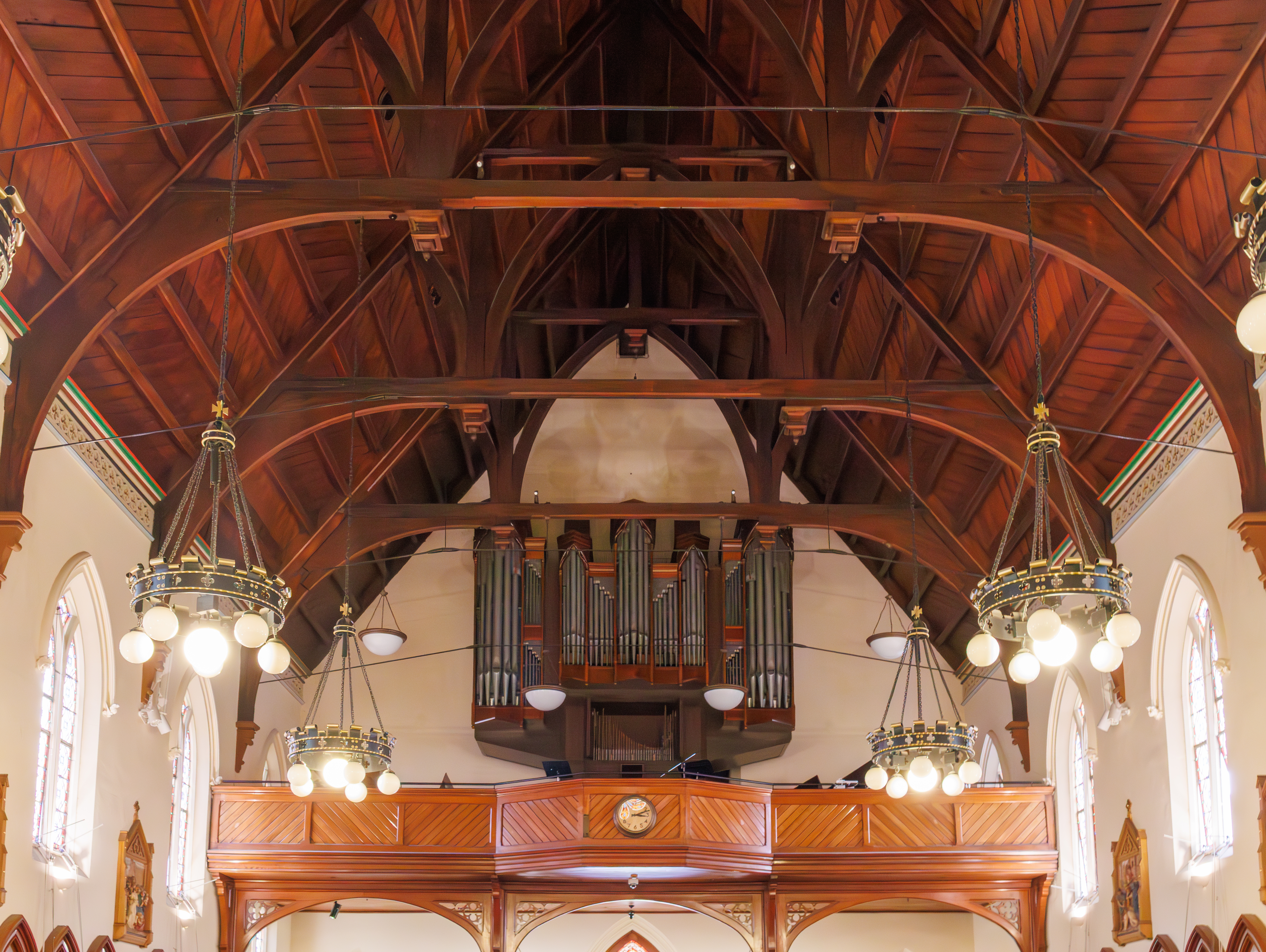
Choir loft and organ

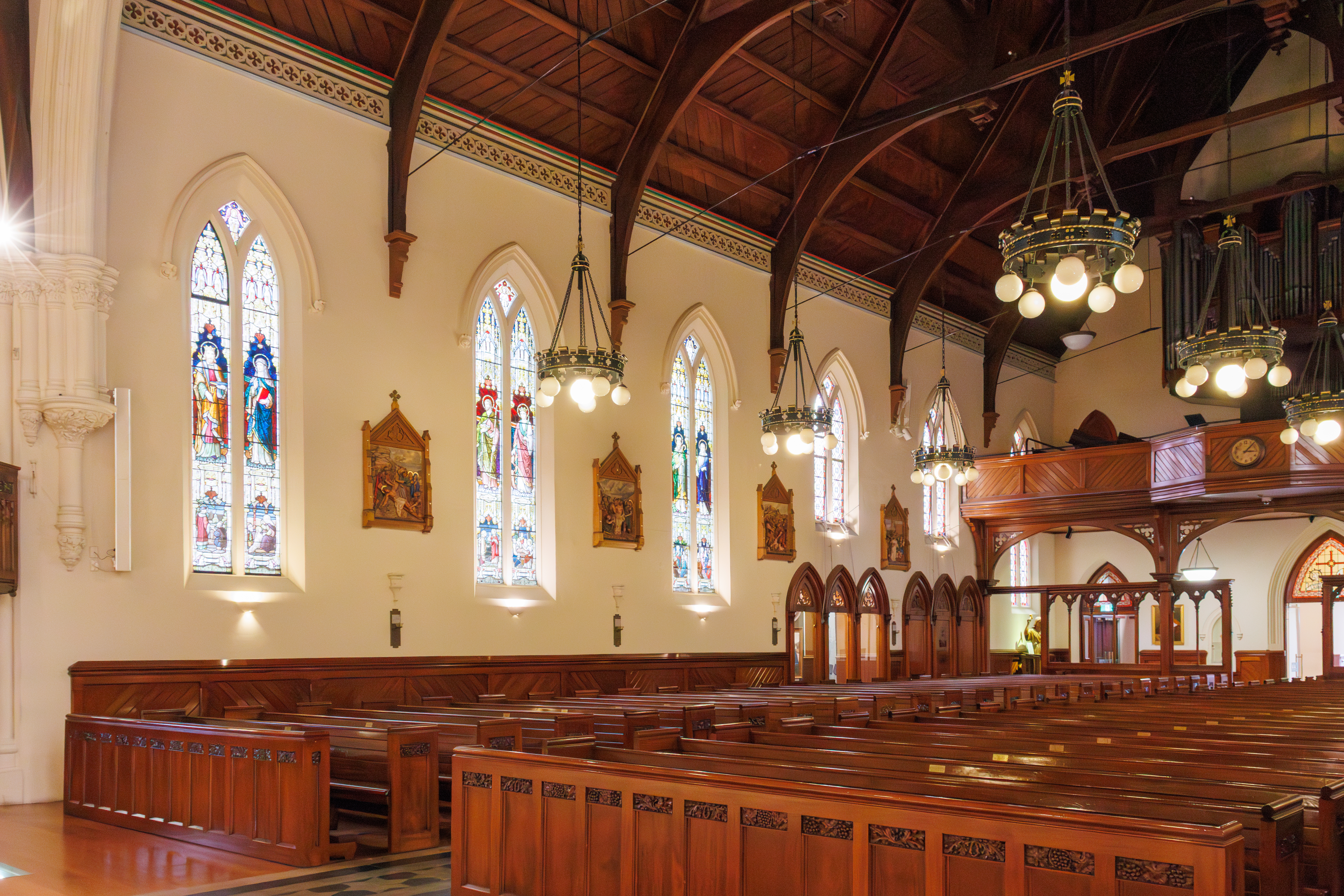
Epistle side

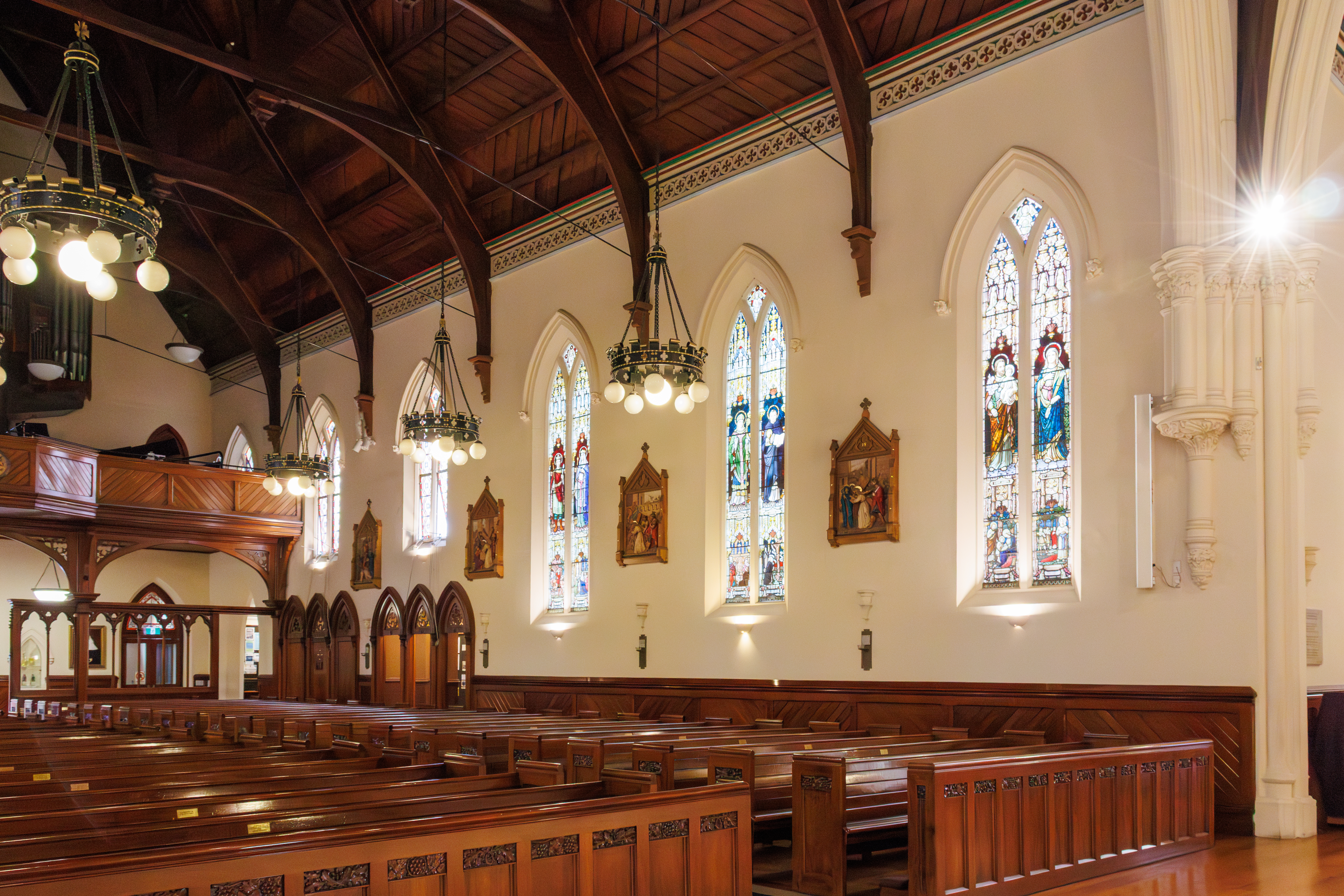
Gospel side

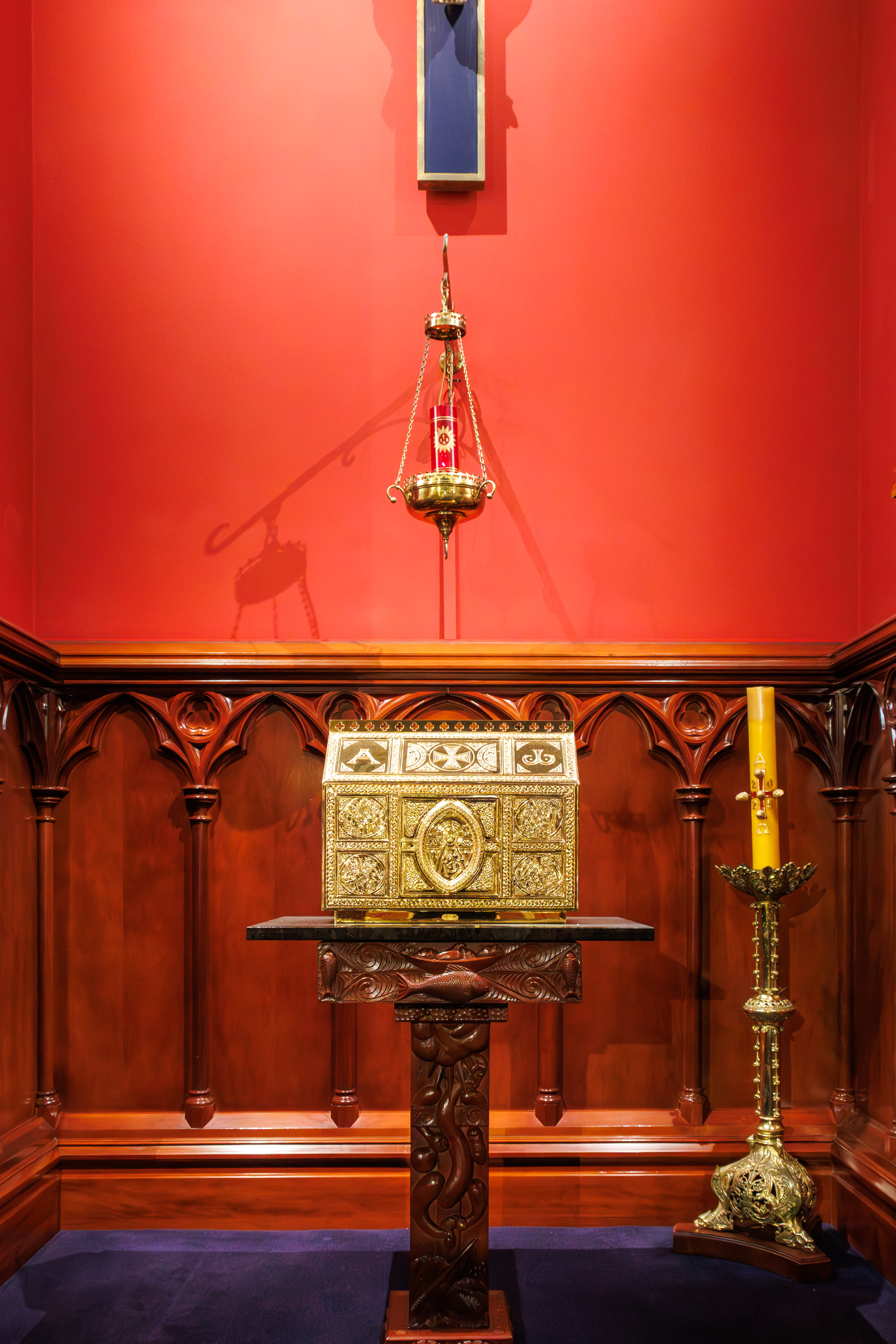
Tabernacle and sanctuary lamp

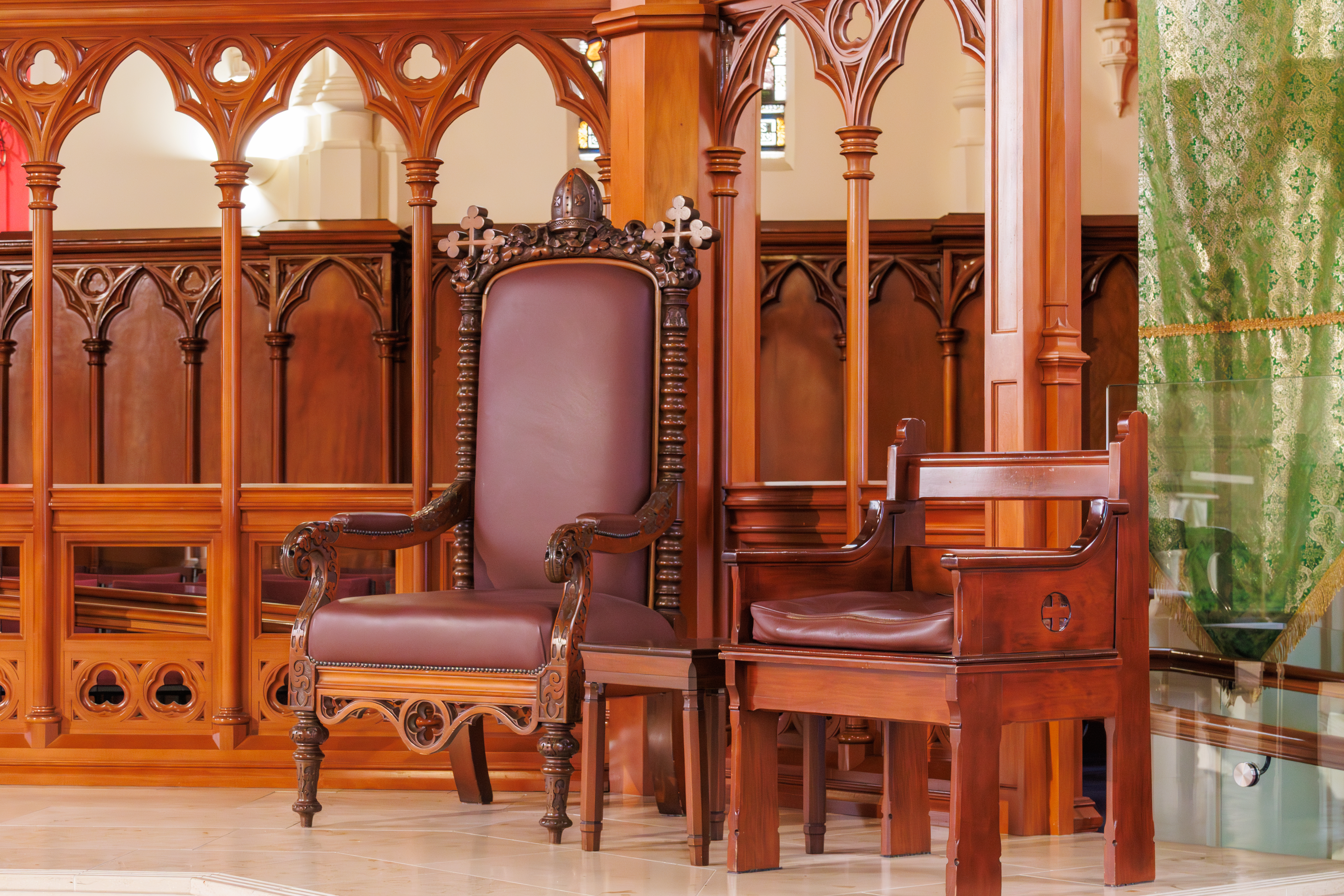
Bishop's cathedra and assistant's chair
