= Mary Cecilia Maher =

Nun, teacher, social worker

Mary Cecilia Maher (13 September 1799 – 10 October 1878), born Ellen Maher and referred to as Mother Mary Cecilia, was a New Zealand religious sister, teacher, and social worker.

She born in Freshford, County Kilkenny, Ireland on 13 September 1799, as Ellen Maher. She entered St Leo's Convent, in Carlow in 1838, becoming a Sister of Mercy, and taking on the religious name of Mary Cecilia Maher. In 1849 Bishop Pompallier visited seeking nuns to emigrate; eight left from St Leo's, led by Maher. They travelled to New Zealand, learning Māori along the way, establishing the Sisters of Mercy in Auckland as the first female religious community in New Zealand in 1850.

The Sisters of Mercy maintained a number of girls schools and convents, initially in Auckland, then in Thames after the 1867 gold rush, and eventually across New Zealand. Maher was superior from 1850–1867 and 1870–1877, before dying in 1878.

== Bibliography ==
- Kirk, Marcienne D. (1998). Remembering Your Mercy: Mother Mary Cecilia Maher and the First Sisters of Mercy in New Zealand, 1850–1880. Sisters of Mercy.
