= Pleasant Villa =

General information
- Type: Villa
- Architectural style: Gothic Revival
- Location: 177 Grey Street, Onehunga
- Construction started: c.1904

Design and construction
- Main contractor: William Kemp

Heritage New Zealand – Category 2
- Designated: 27 June 2008
- Reference no.: 7754

Pleasant Villa is an ornate Gothic Revival villa in Onehunga, Auckland, New Zealand. Constructed c.1904 by local bricklayer William Kemp the villa is a late and rare example of domestic brick Gothic Revival architecture, a style that had gone out of fashion for domiciles at the time of construction. Kemp was a proud Catholic and constructed the Gothic Revival Church of Our Lady of the Assumption, Onehunga. It is believed Kemp's Catholic pride or alternatively his time working on Gothic buildings such as the Tower of London influenced his decision. The building was purchased in 1989 by a preservation society and is registered as a category 2 building with Heritage New Zealand.

== Description ==
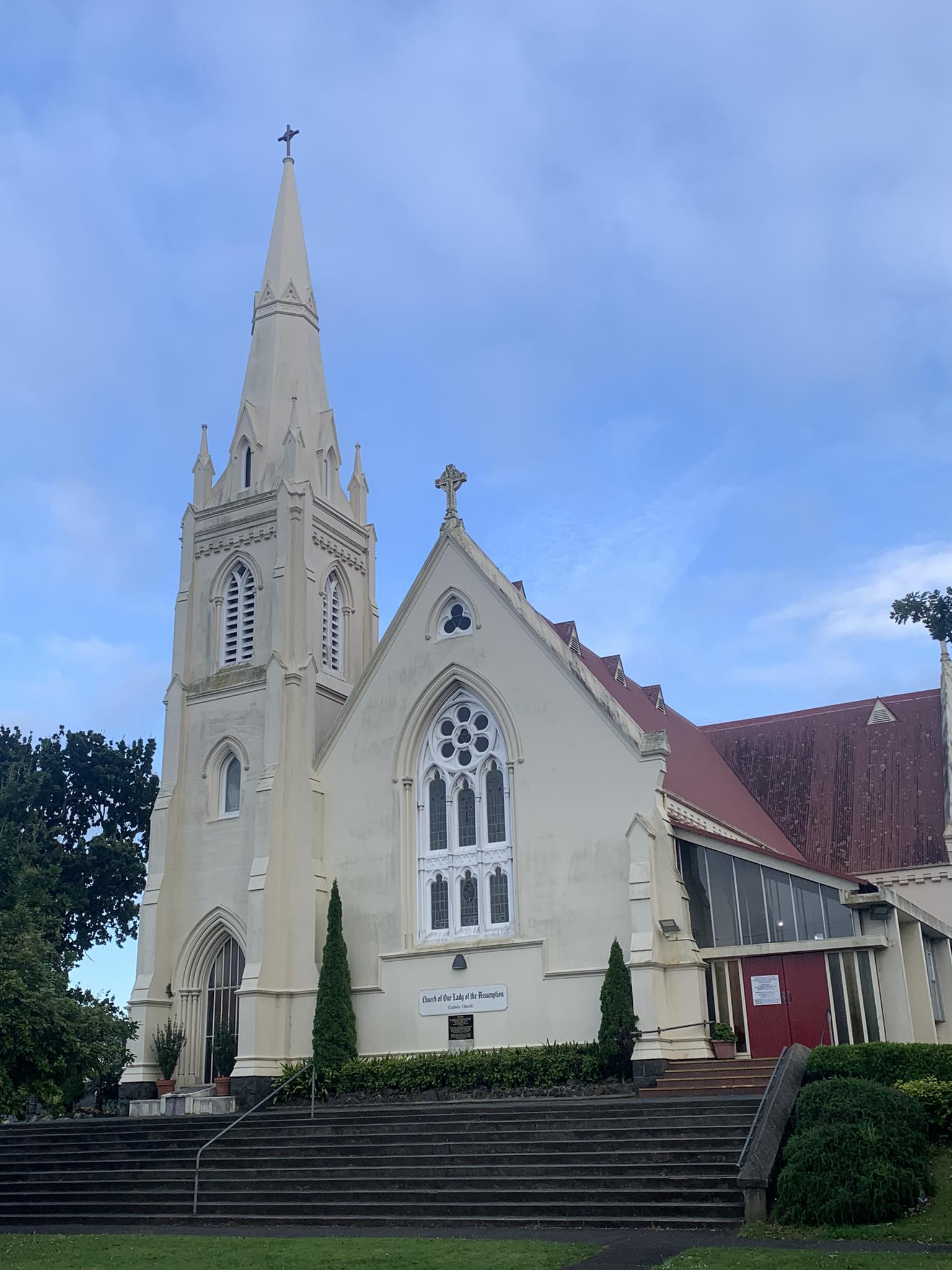
Kemp constructed the Church of Our Lady of the Assumption in Onehunga and was potentially influenced by this in his construction of Pleasant Villa.

Pleasant Villa is an ornate Gothic Revival corner-bay brick villa located on a knoll that overlooks Onehunga. Pleasant Villa is a rare example of a Gothic Revival brick domicile — by the late 19th-century Gothic Revival had gone out of fashion for domestic architecture and the choice of Gothic may be influenced by Kemp's Catholic faith as the Catholic Church continued to construct buildings in the Gothic Revival style (Note: Likely due to the influence of Augustus Pugin over Bishop John Luck) — including the Onehunga Catholic Church and its presbytery, the former of which was constructed by Kemp. Alternatively Kemp's appreciation for the Gothic Revival style may be due to his work in London where he worked on historical Gothic buildings such as the Tower of London. The ornate detailing for an otherwise unimportant domicile evinces Kemp's pride in his trade and his proficiency as a bricklayer. Pleasant Villa has unique detailings such as an escutcheon with the letters NZI (New Zealand Industries) (Note: New Zealand Industries may refer to a company of Kemp's) and plaster scored with ashlar, which gives a mediaeval appearance. The building has many trefoils both in the interior and exterior, which was likely selected due to the association of the trefoil and Irish identity; Kemp was treasurer of the Onehunga branch of the Hibernian Australasian Catholic Benefit Society.

The villa has a slate roof. The ornate verandah wraps around the building connecting the north and west gable, the gables sport a parapet and protruding double-hung sash bay window that is trefoiled at the top. Above each window is an escutcheon bearing the letters 'NZI'. The south and east facade is less detailed due to not facing out onto the road, although the three sash windows have hood mouldings above them for decoration. Departing from the Gothic Revival style are the three brick chimneys, with their positioning being Elizabethan rather than Gothic. Pleasant Villa has many original interior features in-tact such as a dado rail, grooved wainscot, ceiling roses, Art Nouveau tiling, and the original fireplaces. Basalt threshold stones still remain but the basalt walls they were built to complement are no longer extant. The villa has an L-shaped hallway that leads to its six rooms. There is a parlour and a dining room. The main bedroom was converted into the living room in the 20th-century. The kitchen and bathroom have had the most alterations.

An outbuilding of similar design but less ornate was constructed for the toilet. A passageway was constructed in modern times to connect it with the villa.

== Background ==
William Kemp was born in 1841 in England. Kemp had worked as an apprentice bricklayer and stonemason in King's Cross, London, including working on the Tower of London. Kemp arrived in New Zealand in 1864. Kemp worked on the Gothic Revival Shortland Street Post Office in Auckland before moving to Onehunga. Kemp was a Catholic and was the contractor for the Church of Our Lady of the Assumption. Kemp's son, William Kemp Jr, joined his practice in the 1880s. Kemp used his experience as a bricklayer to construct several domiciles around Onehunga, these include The Grottos on Heretaunga Street (before 1881) and The Tower House on Church Street (c.1890).

== History ==
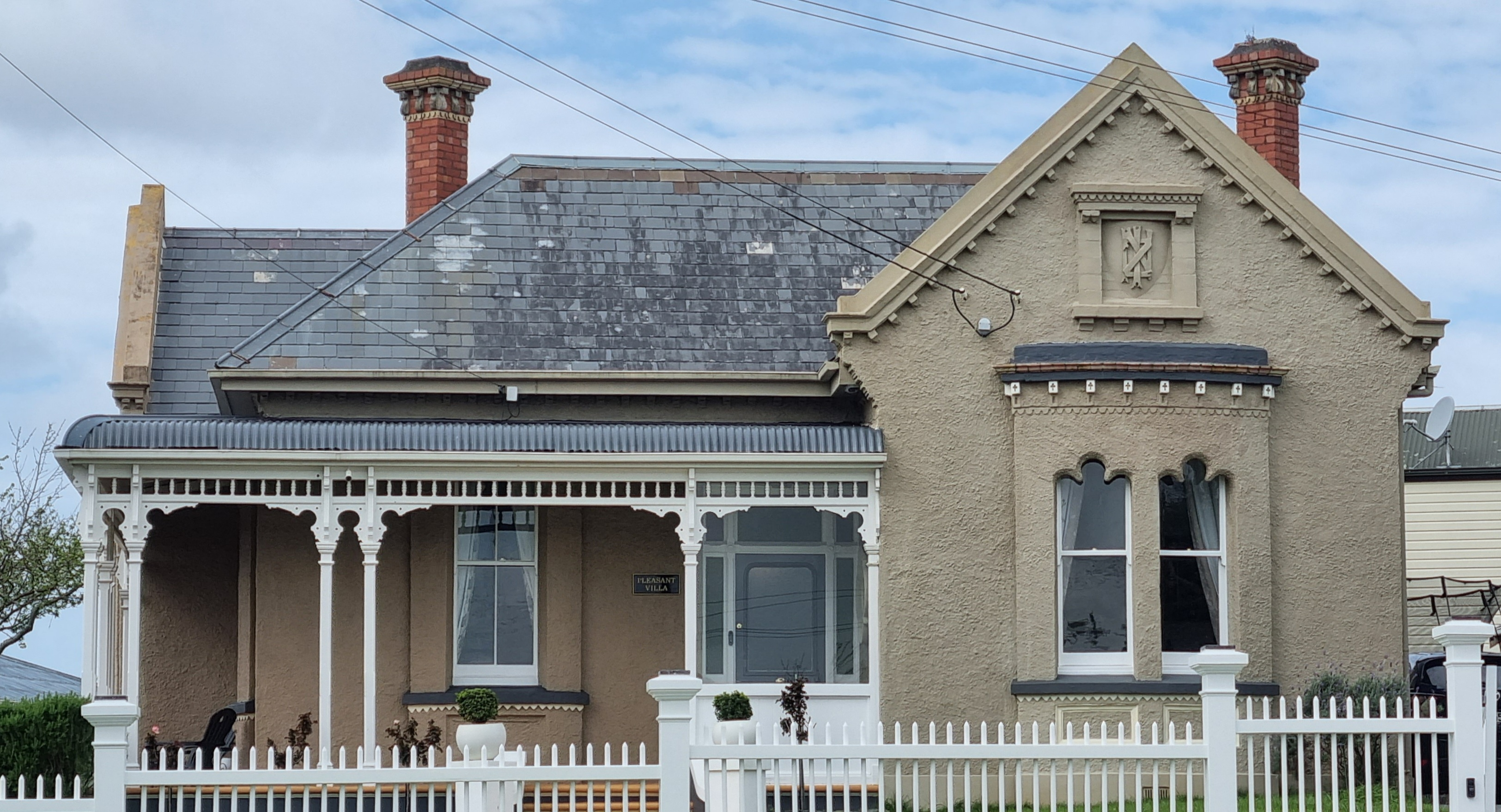
The north and west facade has a protuding bay-window and ornate detailing.

Kemp purchased several surrounding sections to create a 3 acres (1.2 ha) holding for himself. Pleasant Villa was constructed c.1904, likely with the help of William Kemp Jr. In 1906 Kemp died and was buried in the church he had helped construct, evidence of how well-regarded he was within the Onehunga parish. Kemp's wife died the year after and their son Thomas inherited the villa. Thomas may have used the 3 acre section for market gardening. The property was used by Clarence Le Marquand, a brother-in-law of Thomas and was let to various people until c.1924 when Thomas occupied it. Thomas fell into financial hardship around the Great Depression and the property was acquired by George Black in 1930. The property was let to various tenants who only remained for a year or two until William and Doris Stewart rented the property in 1941. In 1949 the 3 acre section was subdivided and in 1958 the Stewarts, who had remained as tenants, purchased the house. Very little of the house had changed by 1989 when it was purchased by Landmark Incorporated, an incorporated society made up of architects, engineers, and lawyers interested in preserving heritage properties. (Note: Landmark Incorporated was formed in 1972 to purchase the Grey Lynn Council Chambers and Fire Station) In 1998 Landmark Inc purchased 15 m^{2} (160 sq ft) of the adjoining section as the historic washhouse encroached over the property boundary. The property remains in use a private domicile.

== Legacy ==
William Kemp Jr. took over his father's bricklaying business and constructed the presbytery for the Onehunga Catholic parish and his private residence Emerald Hill. He also worked on the Onehunga Carnegie Public Library. Kemp Sr. constructed the first Auckland Savings Bank in Onehunga. Other extent buildings constructed by the Kemp family in Onehunga are located on Mays Road, Alfred Street and Grotto Street. Other works by Kemp Sr. outside Onehunga include the Mercer railway tunnel.

== See also ==
- Lisburn House — Another listed brick Gothic Revival building.
