= Edward Costley =

New Zealand philanthropist

Edward Costley (1794 – 18 April 1883) was a New Zealand philanthropist.

Costley was born in Ireland to John and Anne Costley. Costley was known among the "old identities" of Auckland as a man of rather penurious and retiring habits, who had acquired property in the early days, which, with the growth of the city, had become of great value. Costley had arrived in Auckland around 1840, possibly coming on from Australia. He purchased property at a time when it was empty scrubland and as the town of Auckland grew he quietly expanded his landholdings.

He never owned his own house preferring to board with friends, a married couple. On his deathbed he summoned his lawyer, and directed him to divide his wealth among the city charities, seven of these being named.

The estate realised £93,000, which was divided between the Auckland Hospital, Old Men's Home, Sailors' Home, Auckland Institute, Costley Training Institute, Auckland Public Library, and the Parnell Orphan Home, each of which received £12,500. Smaller bequests were made to a range of other charities in Auckland including various organisations run by different religions. It is possibly significant that money was spread across a number of the various religious denominations including homes run by the Anglican and Catholic Churches and inner city Missions and shelters administered by the Methodists and others.

One institution was created by the Costley Trust, apparently on the specific instruction of Edward Costley. A Training School for Boys was built on Richmond Road in Grey Lynn to educate working-class boys in manual trades. This building is now known as Carlile House and is in a state of disrepair.

Since Costley's death an unsigned draft will has come to light which showed that he had long contemplated the application of his wealth to charitable purposes. He died in Auckland on 18 April 1883, and was buried at Symonds Street Cemetery where the Costley Trust erected a monument to his memory. This monument stands to the south of the Anglican Memorial on the eastern side of the cemetery.
