= Carlile House =

Historic building in Auckland, New Zealand

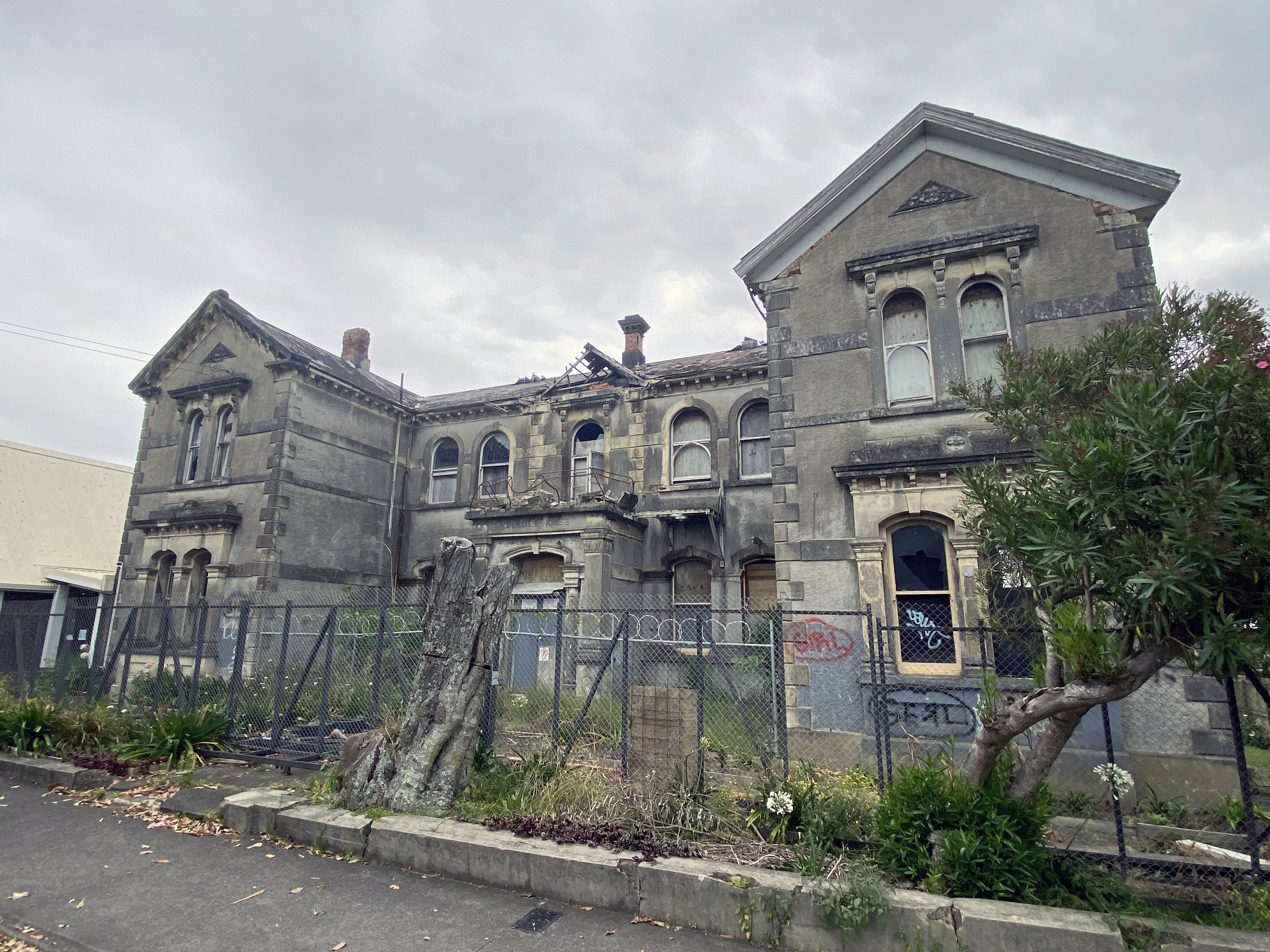
- Façade of the Carlile House (2023)
- Interactive map of the Carlile House area
- Former names: Costley Training Institute

General information
- Architectural style: Italianate
- Location: Grey Lynn, Auckland, 84 Richmond Road, Auckland, New Zealand
- Coordinates: 36.85745027°S 174.74058012°E
- Opened: 1886
- Cost: £2830
- Owner: United Church of Tonga

Design and construction
- Architect: Robert Jones Roberts

Heritage New Zealand – Category 1
- Designated: 12 December 2011
- Reference no.: 9584

Carlile House, formerly Costley Training Institute, is a former boys' home and training centre in Grey Lynn, Auckland, built in 1886. It was enabled by a bequest of £12,500 from Edward Costley. It was originally bequest to the Kohimarama Training School; however, the Kohimarama Training School had since closed. The trustees recommended that a training institution should be established and Sir Robert Stout prepared a Bill that passed without opposition, entitled "The Costley Training Institution Act, 1885".

== History ==
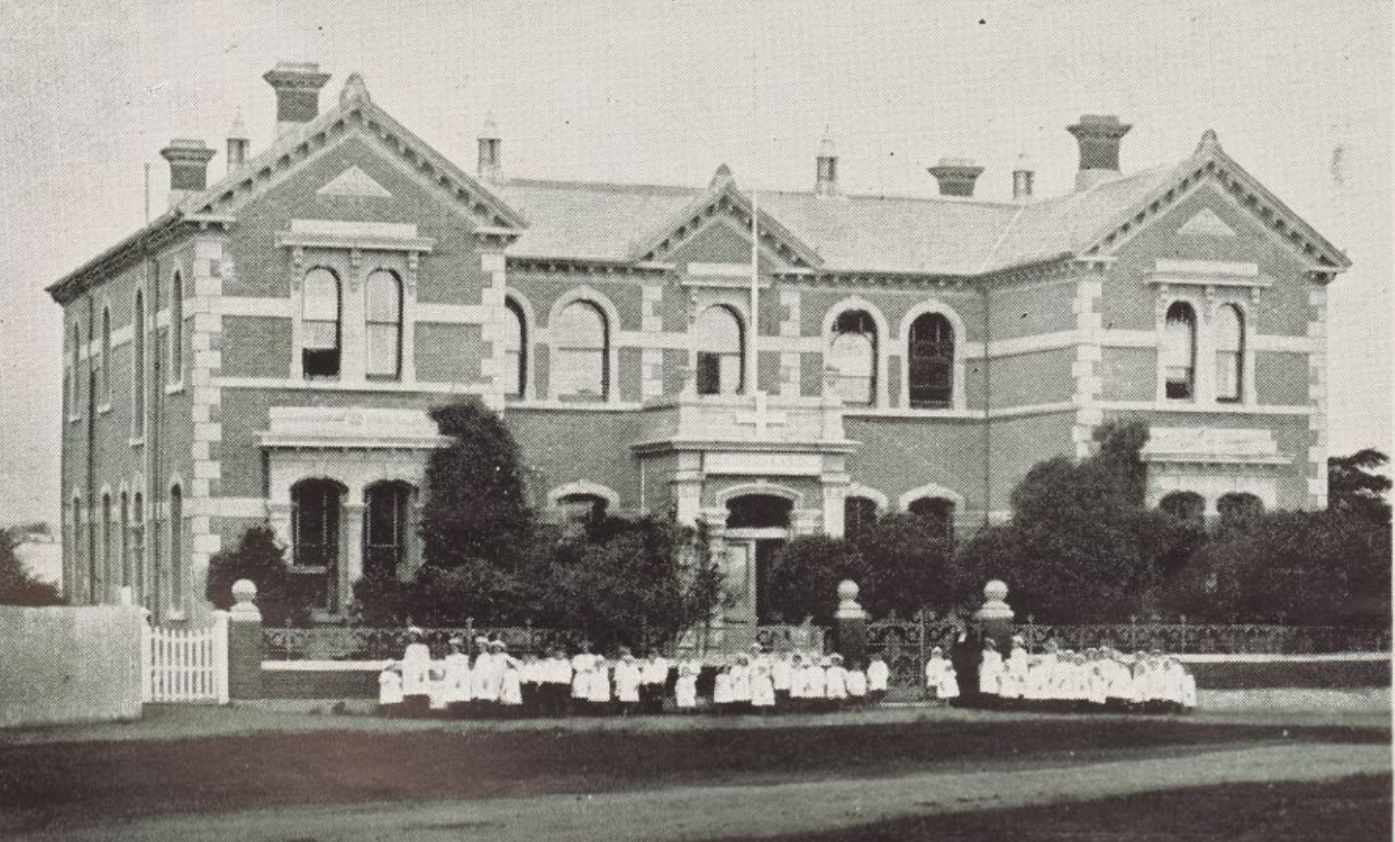
Carlile House photographed in 1909, then known as the Richmond Road Children's Home.

Carlile House, as Costley Training Institute, housed residents who were apprenticed to a range of trades. The land was bought in 1885 for £1025 by William Crush Daldy, Shirley Whitfield Hill and Theodore Minet Haultain as trustees for the Costley Training Institution. By 1886, the buildings had been constructed for £2830, furnished and landscaped for £703, and opened for their first residents.

Following the closure of the Auckland Industrial School in 1896, numbers of residents reduced and the Institute was closed in 1908. From 1908 for over twenty years, it was the Richmond Road Children’s Home. There are several stories about fires and deaths at Carlile House in the early 1900s, as none have been found reported in newspapers, it is likely that these stories are not true.

Following the 1931 Hawkes Bay earthquake, it housed Hukarere Maori Girls' School until 1932. From 1935 to 1969, when it housed the headquarters and training school of the Church Army, founded by Wilson Carlile, and was thus renamed Carlile House. In the early 1970s, Carlile House was a remand home run by the Department of Social Welfare, and in 1973 became the Auckland Alternative School. In 1976–77, a Tongan Community Group bought Carlile House, and it is currently owned by United Church Tonga.

In 2002, the dance performances The Carlile House Project and Strange Fruit were awarded funding from Auckland City Council's creative communities initiative to put on performances in the building. The performances used five rooms within the house to explore the experience of Tongans who immigrated to New Zealand between the 1950 to 2002.

== Architecture ==
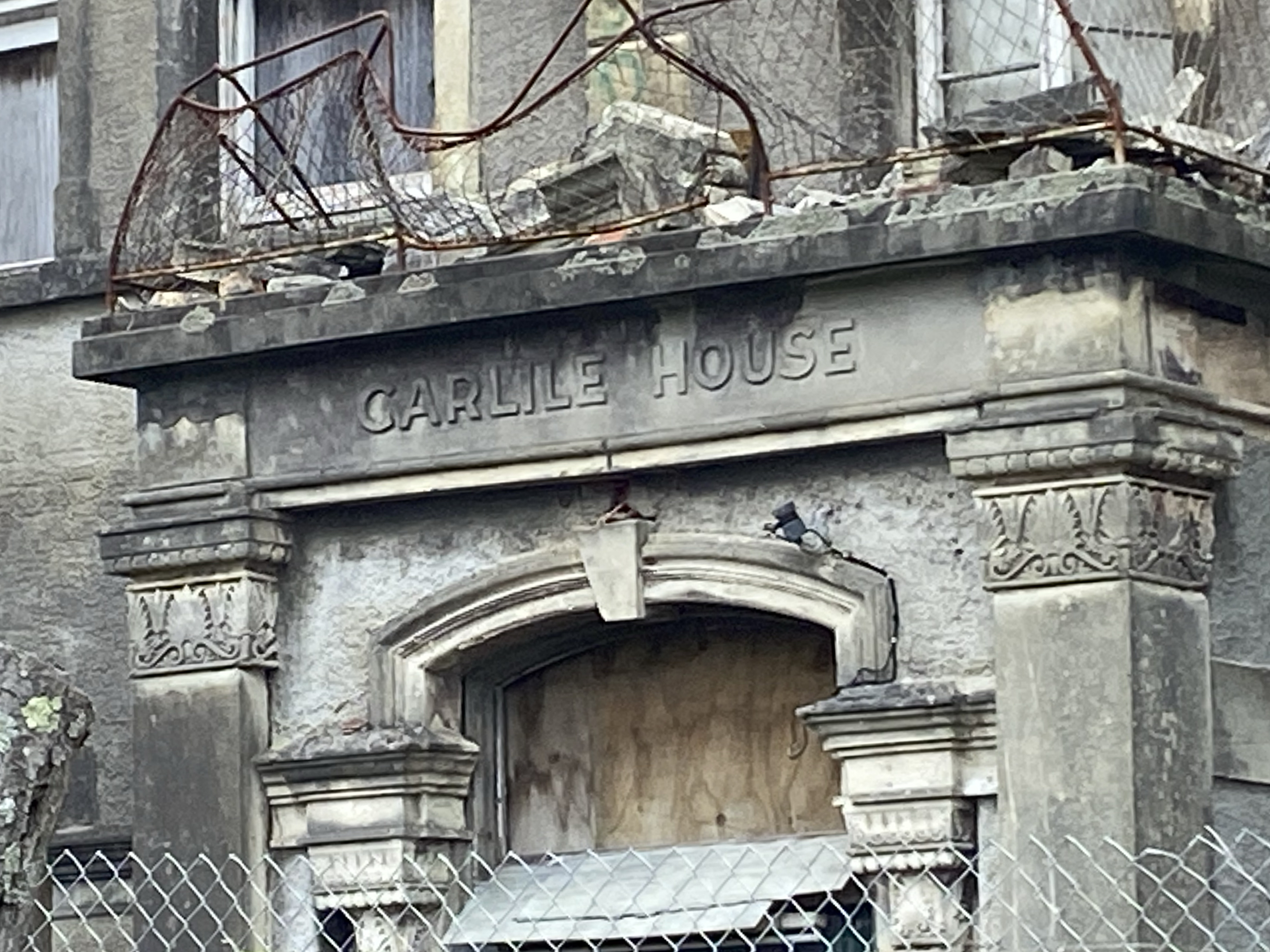
The name "Carlile House" on the portico

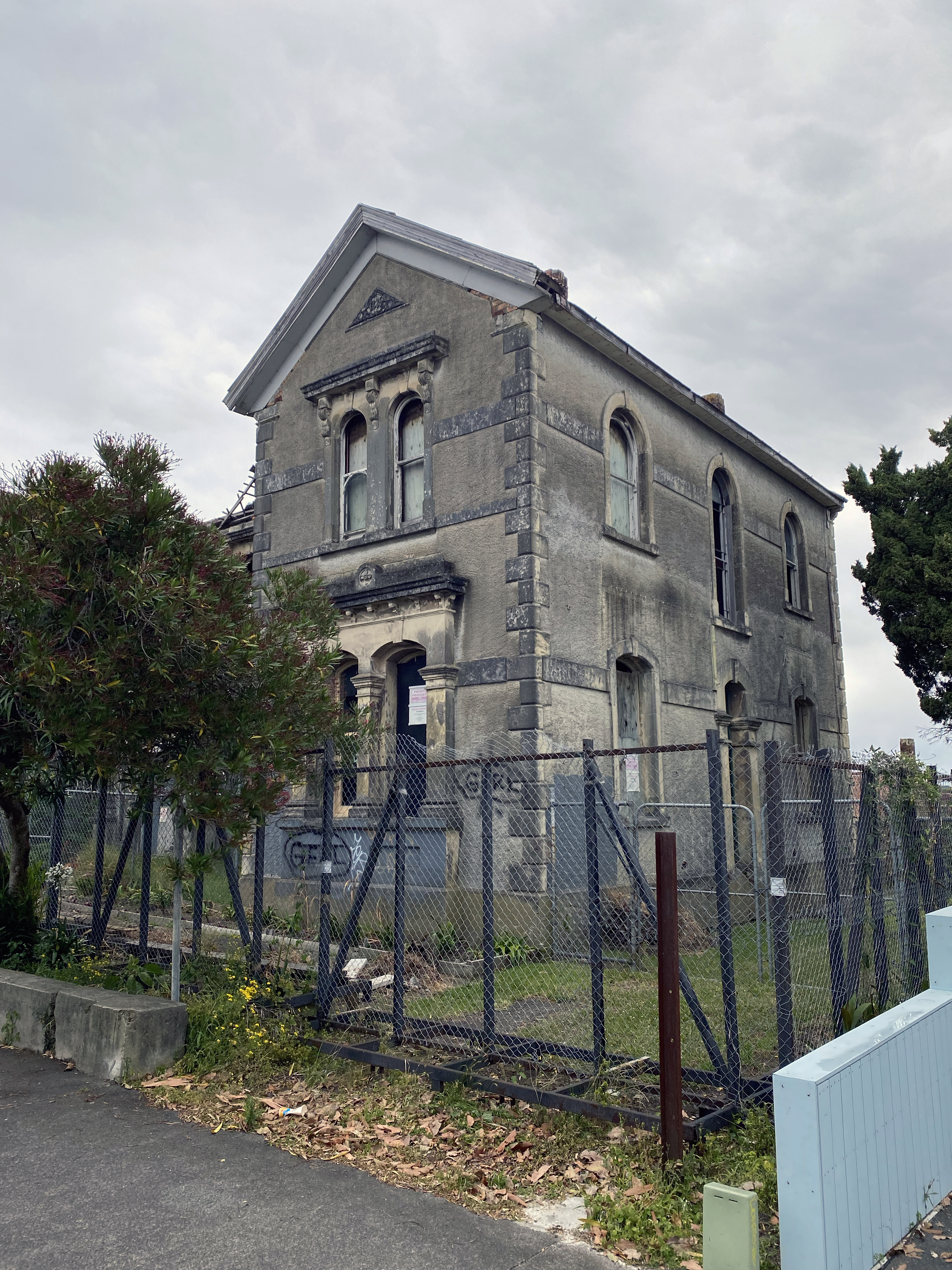
Carlile House side view from Richmond Road

Carlile House is a two-storey late Victorian building of an Italianate style, built in brick with limestone dressings. It has an H-plan layout and the façade has two projecting wings with arched windows and a central single-storey columned portico in the middle with the name "Carlile House" above the entrance.

In August 1886, not long after the Institute opened, The New Zealand Herald described the then Costley Training Institute's interior as having:

"a commodious dining room, and sitting room for use of lads, on the ground floor, where are also situated managers quarters, kitchen, pantry, scullery, storerooms, etc. On the upper floor there are six bedrooms and a commodious room, reserved for infirmary, if necessary, having beautiful views. All the baths have hot or cold water laid on, and the lavatories are of the most approved pattern. It is intended to commence the formation of a library, provision being made for it in a recess in the sitting-room. Gas is laid on throughout the building. The situation of the Institute is pleasant and healthful, being at the bend of the Richmond Road, and the institution has an acre of ground attached."

== Alterations ==
In 1891 and 1898, two single-storey buildings, the workshop and the gymnasium respectively, were added. Two further additions were added to the rear in 1910, including a whole new wing toe provided additional dormitories and bathrooms, and a large hall. In 1913, a memorial chapel was constructed for Sister Cecil (Order of the Good Shepherd) who had managed the facility from 1909 until her death in 1912. In 1916, the verandah on the west side was covered and used as a play area.

In 1978, the chapel was altered to be able to hold 300 worshippers, and dedicated to late Tongan queen, Sālote Tupou III, forming the first Tongan Church in the city. In the mid to late twentieth-century, a metal clad shed was also added behind the building.

== Current state ==
Carlile House is a Heritage New Zealand Category 1 Historic Place. The building is currently in a dilapidated state, and was issued with a dangerous building notice in 2021. There is both interior and exterior water damage, most of the windows are without glazing, there are few downpipes, the corrugated iron on the roof is deteriorating and fires in 2003 and 2013 have destroyed much of the interior. It has been estimated to cost $7 and $10 million to repair Carlile House, and there is contention between Auckland Council and the United Church of Tonga as to the future of the building.
