= Grey Lynn =

Suburb of Auckland, New Zealand

- Suburb
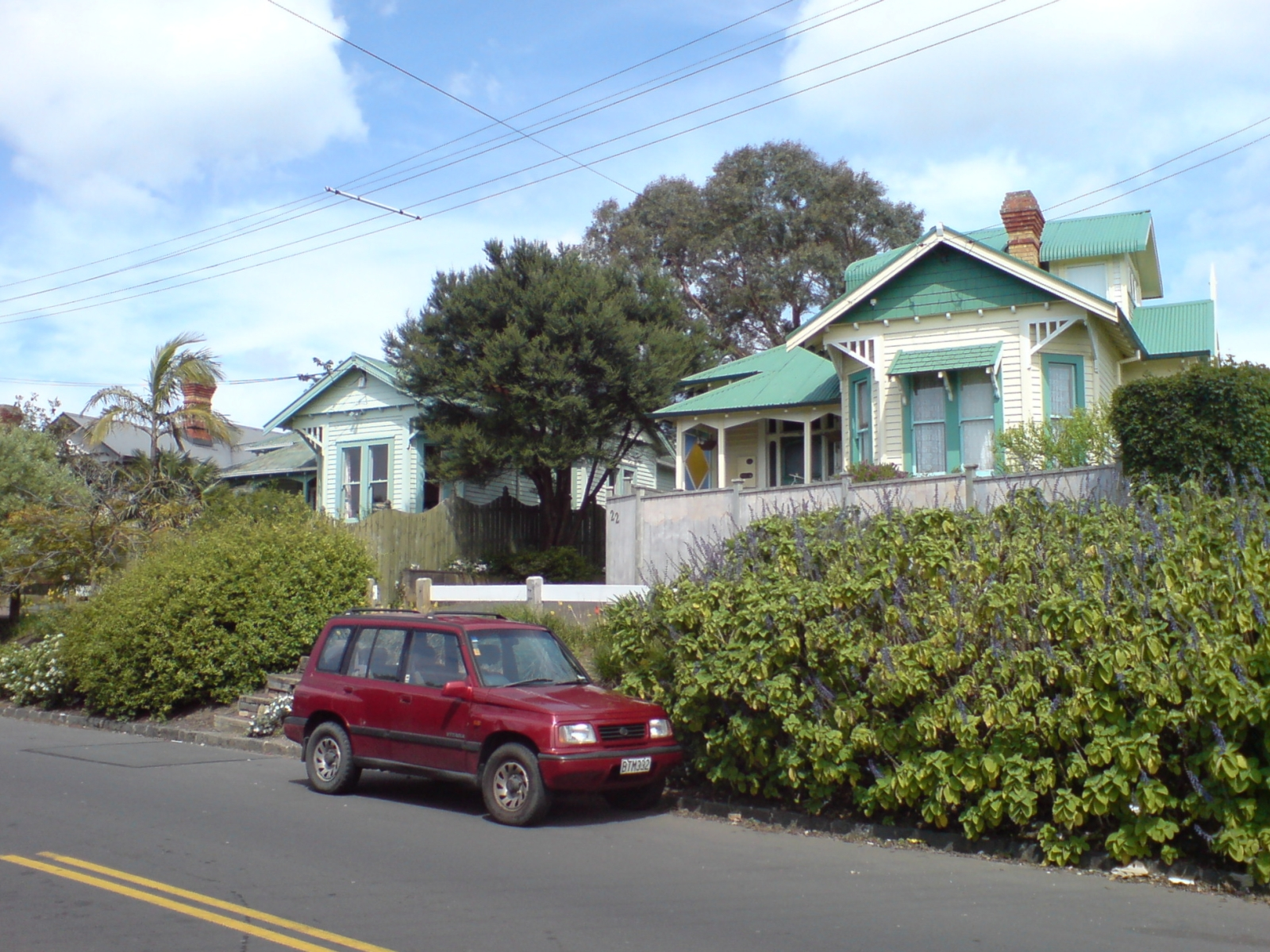
- Older villas in the south of the suburb
- Interactive map of Grey Lynn
- Coordinates: 36.86012°S 174.738858°E
- Country: New Zealand
- City: Auckland
- Local authority: Auckland Council
- Electoral ward: Waitematā and Gulf ward
- Local board: Waitematā Local Board
- Established: 1880s

Area
  - Land: 282 ha (700 acres)

Population (June 2025)
  - Total: 11,600
  - Density: 4,110/km^{2} (10,700/sq mi)
- Postcode: 1021

Westmere	Herne Bay	Ponsonby
Point Chevalier	Grey Lynn	Newton
Western Springs	Morningside	Arch Hill, Kingsland

Grey Lynn is an inner suburb of Auckland, New Zealand, located 3 kilometres (1.9 mi) to the west of the city centre. Originally a separate borough, Grey Lynn amalgamated with Auckland City in 1914.

Grey Lynn is centred on Grey Lynn Park, which was not part of the original subdivision of 1883, since the land was too steep and too wet for house construction. In 1915, the land was drained and levelled for playing fields. The park is home to the annual Grey Lynn Park Festival, which attracts around 100,000 visitors on the third Saturday in November.

== History ==
Prior to the arrival of Europeans in Auckland, Grey Lynn was a frequent transit point with abundant food sources and access to freshwater. Food sources included several kūmara plantations in Grey Lynn, on the hill slopes above Opoutukeha, Coxs Creek. In the late 17th or early 18th century, there were a series of raids in the area led by Kāwharu (Tainui), known as Raupatu Tīhore. Kāwharu reportedly rested his head on the ridge that is now the location of Surrey Crescent, leading to it being called Te Rae o Kāwharu (Kāwharu's brow), which was later adopted as the Māori name of Grey Lynn School.

=== Early European settlements and farming ===
Grey Lynn was part of the first 3000-acre block of land gifted by Ngāti Whātua Ōrākei in October 1840. The Grey Lynn area was originally known as Newton until being renamed in August 1899.

In 1844 and 1845, blocks of land in the western part of Grey Lynn were auctioned off. In the early 1840s, John Monteforte bought Surrey Hills, which encompassed much of the land from Ponsonby to Richmond Roads, totalling 198 acres (80 hectares). In 1847, Thomas Crummer and James Williamson bought Surrey Hills and eventually owned all the land bounded by Ponsonby, Great North and Richmond Roads, except for "three blocks at the northern end where Tutanekai, Hakanoa and Sackville streets run," the majority of modern Grey Lynn.

The Surrey Hills was leased from the early 1840s to the mid-1880s, and housed a farm and a sheep run. Notably, in 1871, Frank Lawry leased part of the Surrey Hills and created a dairy farm. Following Crummer's death, Williamson bought the Crummer's children's share in Surrey Hills. When Williamson was facing financial hardship in the early 1880s, Surrey Hills was bought by the Auckland Agricultural Company.

=== Early industry and infrastructure ===
Grey Lynn had a number of brickyards, particularly along the Great North Road. In 1871, Thomas Faulder was appointed night soil contractor for Auckland, and used his land between Surrey Crescent and Tuarangi Road for its disposal. During the early 1870s, there were numerous complaints over the use of this land for this purpose, including to the Central Board of Health in 1874. The depot was relocated to Avondale in 1875. In 1906, James Tattersfield set up a mattress factory on the corner of Sackville and Richmond Road. The factory was later expanded to produce carpets.

=== Initial subdivisions ===
In 1883, the 127 hectares (310 acres) that was the Surrey Hills Estate was subdivided for residential purposes, the largest subdivision in the area at the time. In 1885, there was a depression in the economy which slowed building on the estate. In the late 1890s-early 1900s, building resumed and, by 1903, there were 1040 dwellings. With the extensions of the tramlines to West Lynn in 1910, there was another wave of subdivisions. There was also the development of shops - notably on Great North Road, Williamson Avenue and Tuarangi Road.

=== Post World War One ===
In 1902, Grey Lynn electorate voted to be dry, and this continued until 1937. This resulted in a number of non-alcoholic beverage manufacturers to establish operations in the Grey Lynn area. In addition to these businesses, in 1925, Dominion Compressed Yeast Company set up a factory in Grey Lynn to supply their North Island market, and, in 1929, Auckland Laundry Company moved its operations to Surrey Crescent. In 1938, the existing store fronts on the corners of Williamson Avenue, were replaced with the Grey Lynn Post Office and the ASB Bank.

In the 1920s, Auckland City Council began building workers housing with 60 houses built on Old Mill and West View Roads. In the 1930s, with the Great Depression, the demand for workers decreased. In the 1940s, state-owned units for pensioners were built on the Great North Road and on the corner of Surrey Crescent and Gilbert Avenue. After World War Two, Auckland's manufacturing businesses started booming, existing factories in Grey Lynn expanded, new factories were established in the area, and there was significant demand on housing. Grey Lynn remained a largely working-class suburb until the 1970s.

=== Modern history ===
The 1970s saw a renewed interest in older Victorian properties, and from that period onwards many young professionals began buying dilapidated kauri villas in areas like Grey Lynn and renovating them. From the early 1980s, this gentrification began to visibly change the area, resulting in an increase in house prices and in higher rents. This also led to an increase in the number of people renting in Grey Lynn. In 1961, 31% of people in Grey Lynn were renting, by 1981 this had already increased to 45%.

In the 1980s and 1990s, businesses in the creative fields started developing in Grey Lynn, including the Gow Langsford Gallery on the corner of Richmond Road and Warnock Street in 1987 and Mai FM on Crummer Road in 1992. The offices of Recorded Music New Zealand are still located on Hakanoa Street. Other businesses, such as Burrell Demolition and Wilton Motor Body factory, moved out of the area, and were replaced with housing or businesses and shops that reflected the gentrification of the area.

In 1972, the Grey Lynn community requested a community centre which opened in 1975. It was redeveloped in 2000, and remains open to this day.

== Local governance ==
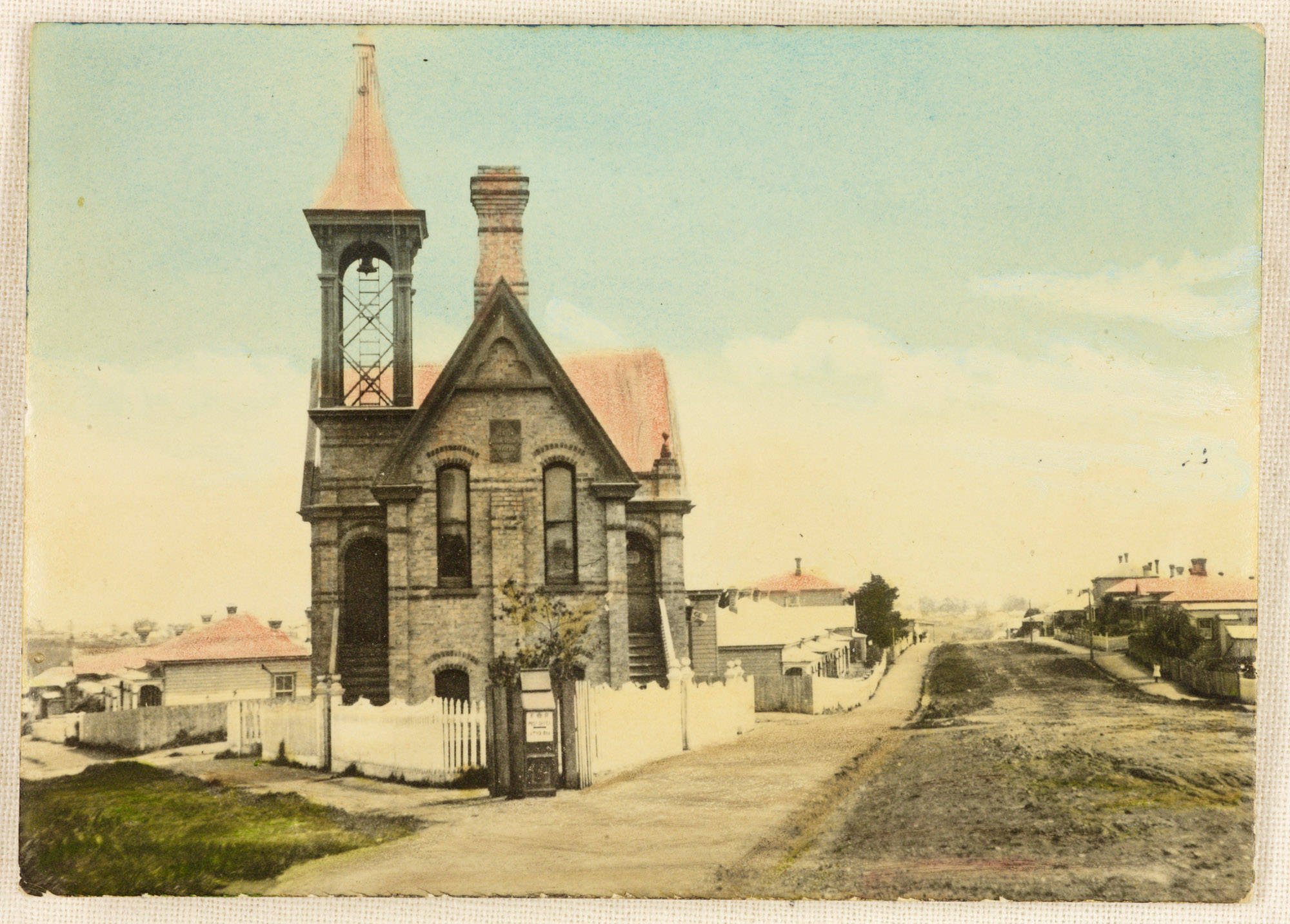
The Grey Lynn Council Chambers and Fire Station circa 1910. To the right is Rose Road

In 1867–1869, the Newton Highway District was formed, encompassing the land bordered by Great North Road, Tuarangi Road and Motions Creek. The Newton Highway Board originally administered an area of 366 hectares (900 acres). In November 1885, the Newton Borough Council was formed and took over administration from the Highway Board. In 1878 the road board was recorded with the name Richmond but later records continued to use the name Newton. In 1901 the borough was renamed to Grey Lynn, in honour of Sir George Grey. In 1914 Grey Lynn was amalgamated with the City of Auckland.

=== Mayors ===
- Richard T. Warnock, 1885–1887
- F. J. Jones, 1887–1888
- S. J. Ambury, 1888–1890
- Samuel Carey Brown, 1890–1893
- Thomas English, 1893–1894
- Richard T. Warnock, 1894–1896
- John Wisdom Shackelford, 1896–1899
- Richard T. Warnock, 1899–1903
- John Wisdom Shackelford, 1903–1904
- John Farrell, 1904–1907
- George Sayers, 1907–1909
- William John Holdsworth, 1909–1912
- George Baildon, 1912–1914

== Grey Lynn Park ==
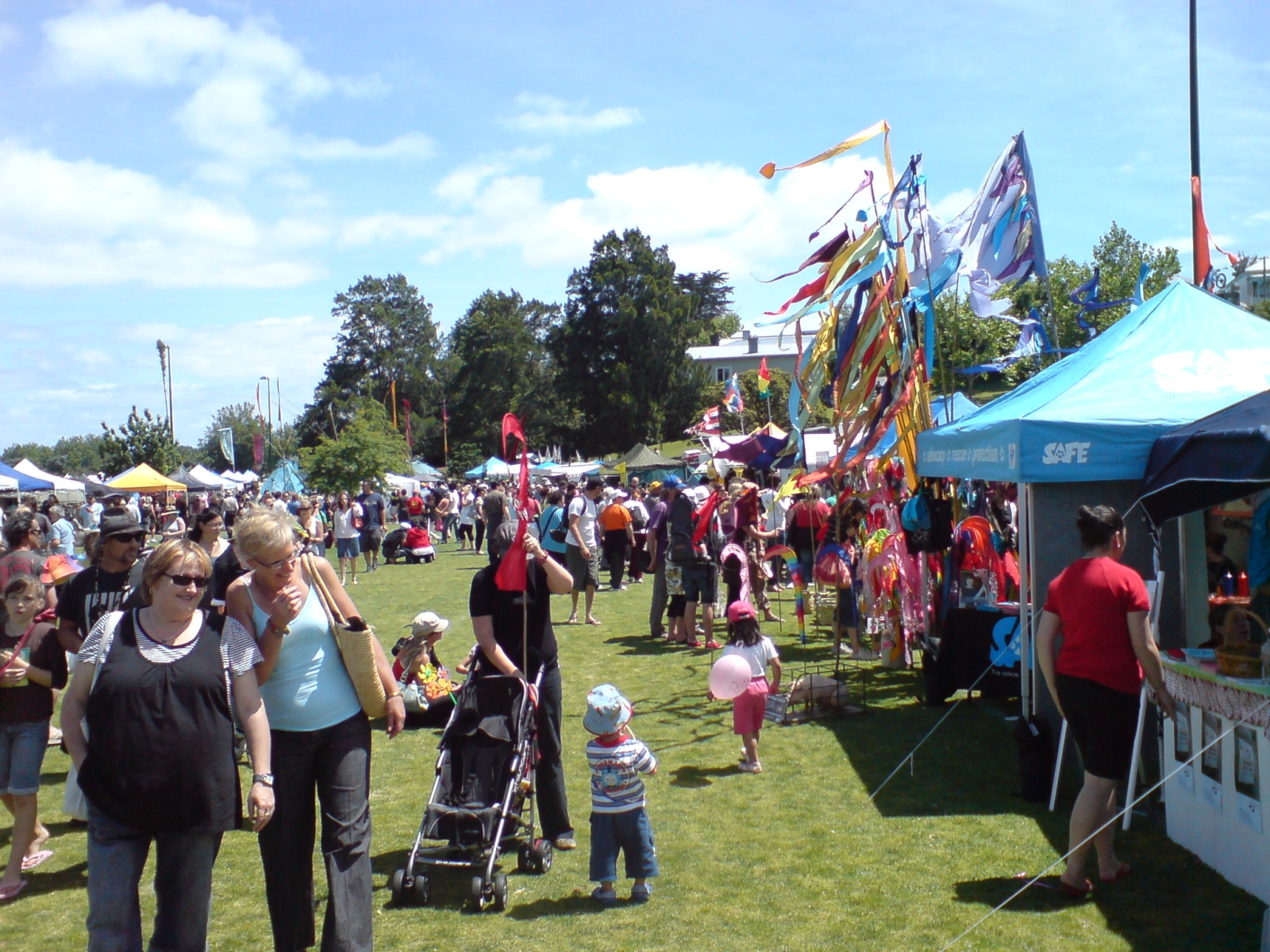
The Grey Lynn Festival in 2008

Grey Lynn Park was established in the 1883, at the site of a former dairy farm. The Grey Lynn Park Festival has been since 1984 and celebrated its 25th anniversary in 2009. The event, which attracts on average 100,000 visitors each year, is organised by four people who raise money from stall fees and charitable grants. It started as a local community get-together with working-class and Pasifika roots, though the appeal has broadened through the decades. Local band Unity Pacific first performed at the festival in 1987, and have appeared many times since. They headlined in 2009.

== Education and sports ==
Grey Lynn School and Newton Central School are contributing primary (years 1–6) schools with rolls of 248 and 308, respectively.

St Joseph's School is a Catholic state-integrated full primary (years 1–8) school with a roll of 75.

All these schools are coeducational. Rolls are as of July 2026.

Secondary schools serving the area include Auckland Girls' Grammar School, Mount Albert Grammar School, and Western Springs College.

Grey Lynn Park is the home ground of the Richmond Rovers rugby league club, one of the oldest Rugby League clubs in Auckland.

== Demographics ==
Grey Lynn covers 2.82 km^{2} (1.09 sq mi) and had an estimated population of 11,600 as of June 2025, with a population density of 4,113 people per km^{2}.

Historical population
Year	Pop.	±% p.a.
2006	10,242	—
2013	10,842	+0.82%
2018	11,736	+1.60%
2023	11,052	−1.19%

Grey Lynn had a population of 11,052 in the 2023 New Zealand census, a decrease of 684 people (−5.8%) since the 2018 census, and an increase of 210 people (1.9%) since the 2013 census. There were 5,406 males, 5,559 females and 87 people of other genders in 4,266 dwellings. 10.6% of people identified as LGBTIQ+. The median age was 34.7 years (compared with 38.1 years nationally). There were 1,551 people (14.0%) aged under 15 years, 2,838 (25.7%) aged 15 to 29, 5,718 (51.7%) aged 30 to 64, and 942 (8.5%) aged 65 or older.

People could identify as more than one ethnicity. The results were 79.0% European (Pākehā); 10.9% Māori; 11.6% Pasifika; 10.2% Asian; 3.1% Middle Eastern, Latin American and African New Zealanders (MELAA); and 1.3% other, which includes people giving their ethnicity as "New Zealander". English was spoken by 97.1%, Māori language by 3.0%, Samoan by 2.6%, and other languages by 17.1%. No language could be spoken by 1.7% (e.g. too young to talk). New Zealand Sign Language was known by 0.3%. The percentage of people born overseas was 29.3, compared with 28.8% nationally.

Religious affiliations were 23.1% Christian, 1.4% Hindu, 0.8% Islam, 0.4% Māori religious beliefs, 0.8% Buddhist, 0.5% New Age, 0.4% Jewish, and 1.6% other religions. People who answered that they had no religion were 65.9%, and 5.3% of people did not answer the census question.

Of those at least 15 years old, 4,956 (52.2%) people had a bachelor's or higher degree, 3,327 (35.0%) had a post-high school certificate or diploma, and 1,224 (12.9%) people exclusively held high school qualifications. The median income was $63,500, compared with $41,500 nationally. 2,745 people (28.9%) earned over $100,000 compared to 12.1% nationally. The employment status of those at least 15 was that 6,099 (64.2%) people were employed full-time, 1,263 (13.3%) were part-time, and 282 (3.0%) were unemployed.

Individual statistical areas
Name	Area (km^{2})	Population	Density (per km^{2})	Dwellings	Median age	Median income
Grey Lynn North	0.73	2,913	3,990	1,047	35.9 years	$64,700
Grey Lynn West	0.80	2,865	3,581	1,080	35.9 years	$54,800
Grey Lynn Central	0.71	3,471	4,889	1,317	34.2 years	$66,100
Grey Lynn East	0.58	1,800	3,103	819	32.8 years	$66,400
New Zealand					38.1 years	$41,500

== Notable buildings ==
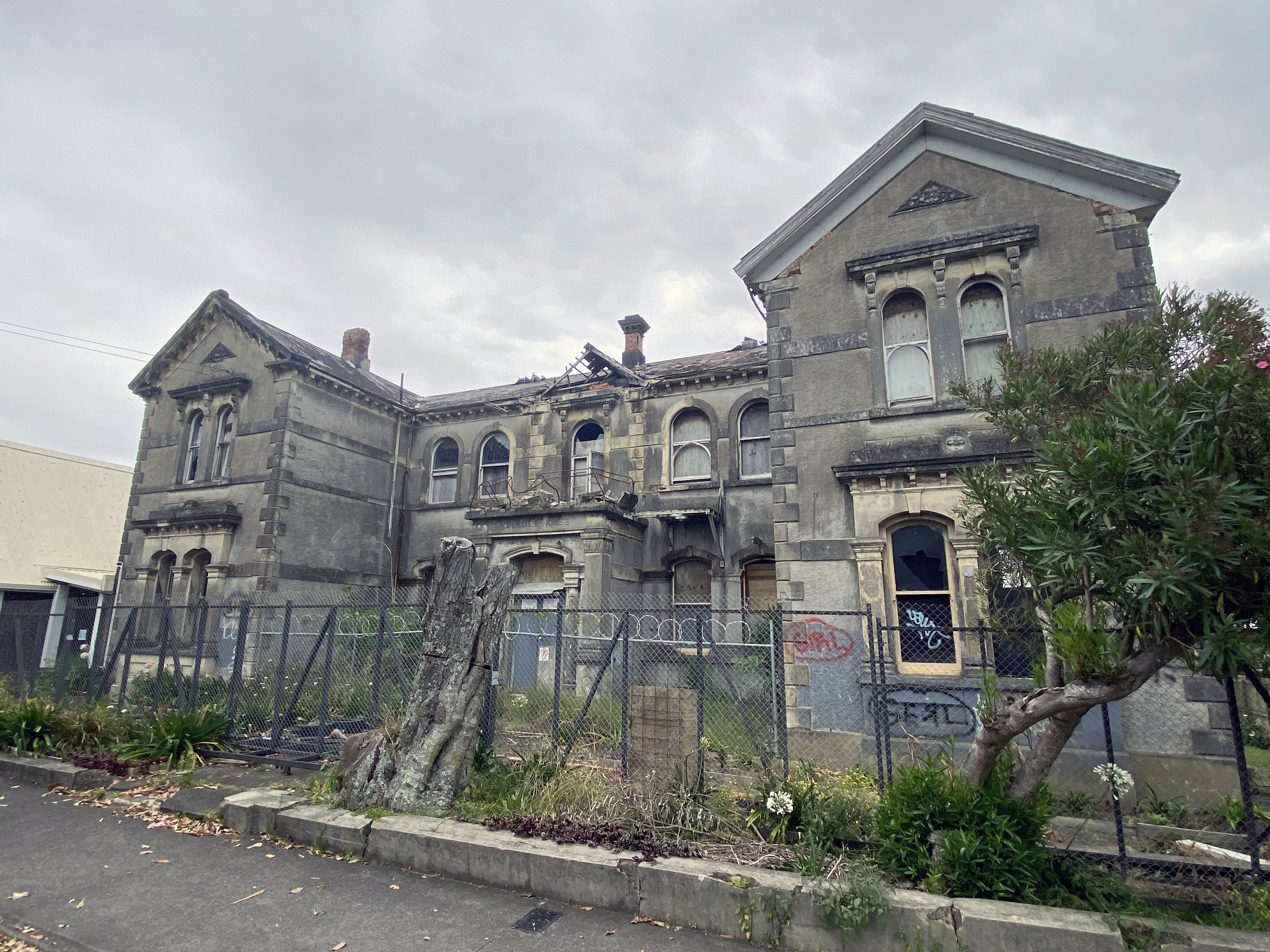
Carlile House

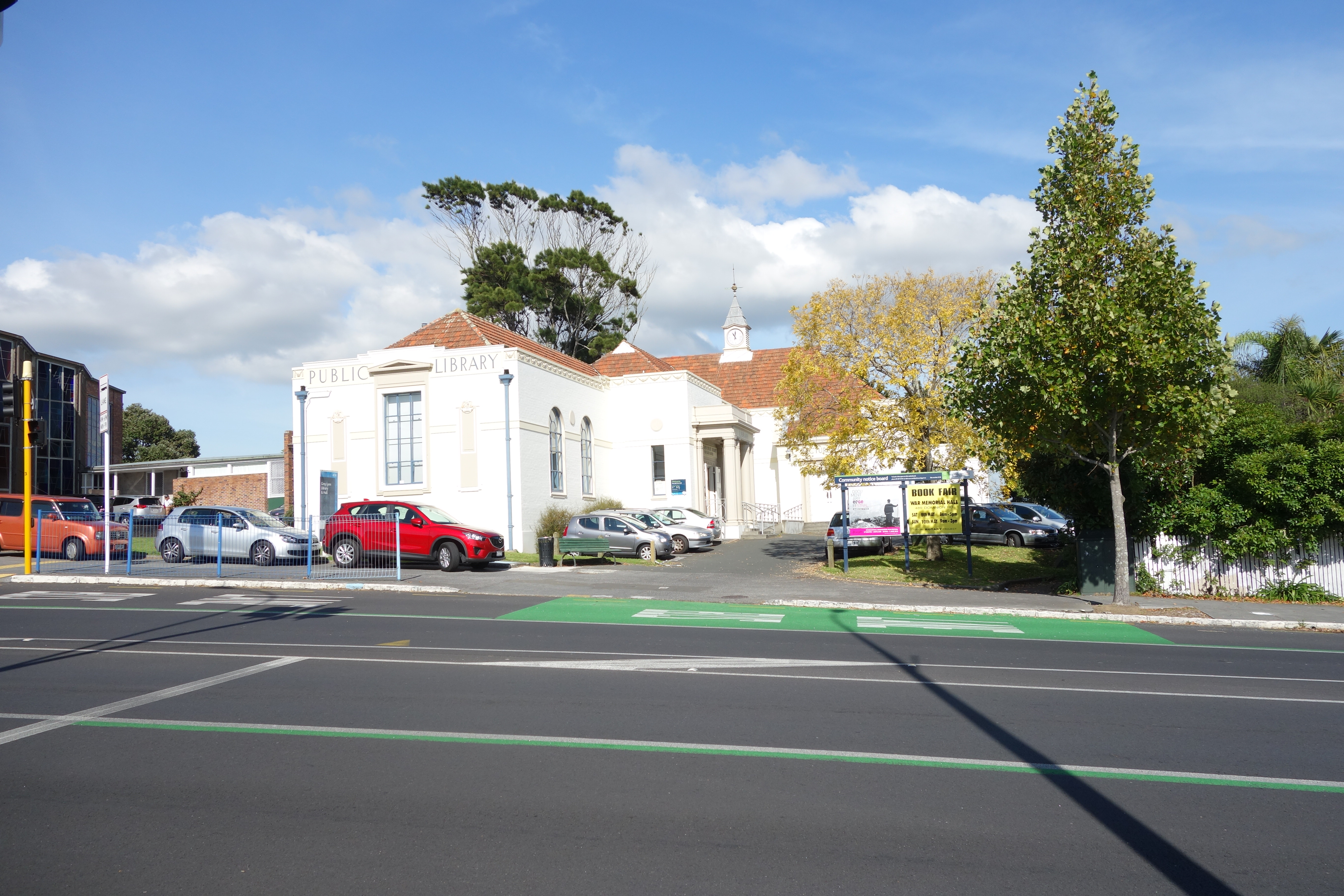
Grey Lynn Public Library

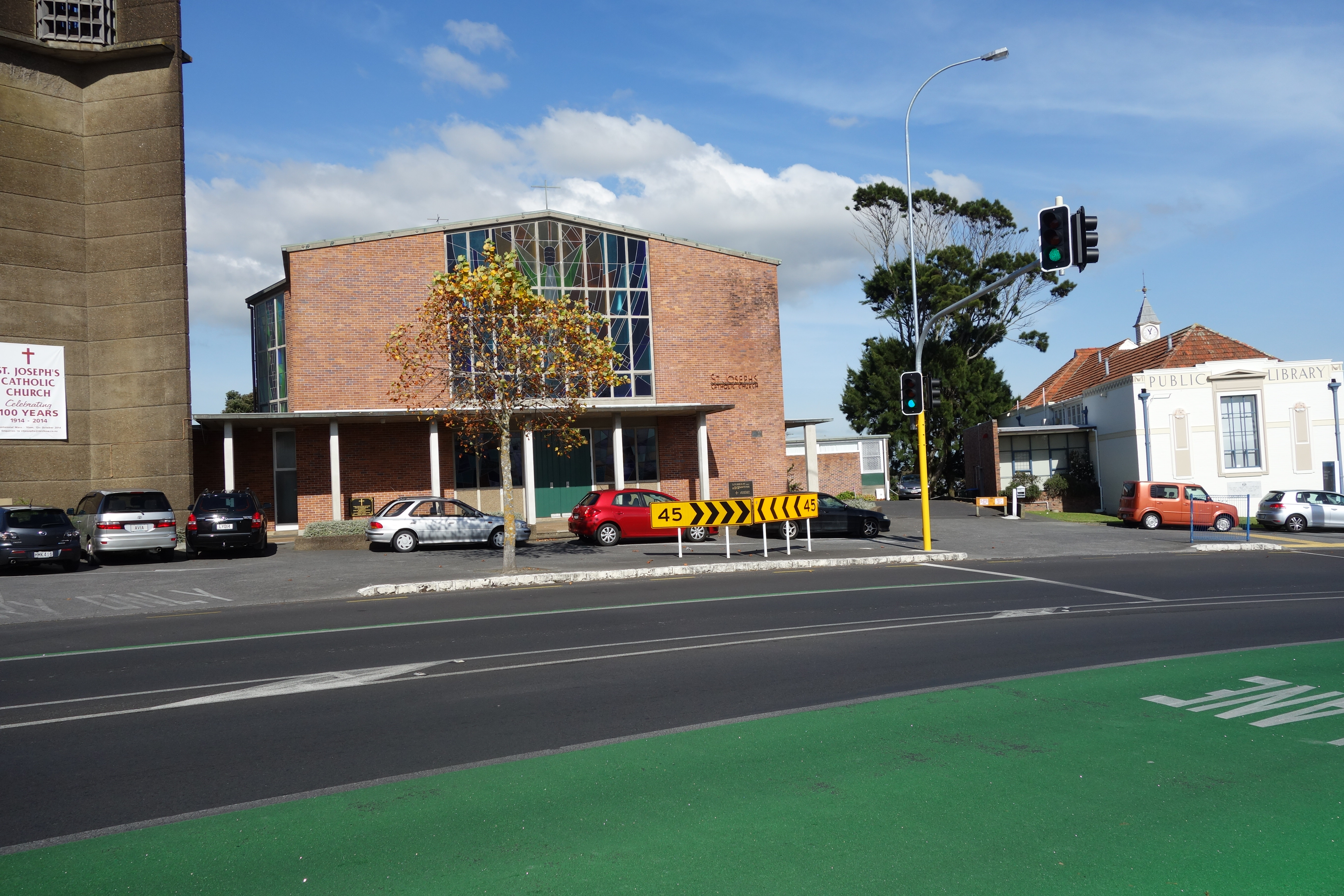
St Joseph's Church

- Grey Lynn Council Chambers and Fire Station: The former Borough Council Chambers and Fire Station. This building is distinguished by a wooden spire (recently restored) which originally housed the fire bell. Standing at the Ponsonby Road end of Williamson Avenue, this brick building dates from 1889, was designed by John Mitchell.
- Former Auckland Savings Bank: Located on Ponsonby Road near the intersection with Karangahape Road. This italianate building was designed in 1885 by Edward Bartley – originally a single story building it received a second story designed by the same architect in 1900. The former banking chamber is distinguished by the use of New Zealand marble. In the 1920s the lower part of the room was lined with panelling made of Cloudy Bay Marble from Nelson. Currently occupied by an Art Gallery.
- Allendale House: At the corner of Crummer Road and Ponsonby Road stands the large 1890s Italianate house of George Allen, a saddle and harness maker. Allendale is a local landmark, having been successively a doctor's surgery, Māori girls hostel, boarding house, refuge for alcoholic men, and a restaurant. In 1989, it was purchased by the ASB Community Trust, now Foundation North, as its headquarters and was the subject of a large restoration and extension project from 2013 to 2015.
- Carlile House: A large Italianate building at 84 Richmond Road, designed by Robert Jones Roberts. Built in 1886 as an industrial school named the Costley Training Institute as part of the bequest of Edward Costley who left money for several Auckland charities. Owned by the adjacent church, it is now in poor condition and vandalised. The original stables are still visible on the Chamberlain Street side.
- Grey Lynn Public Library: Located at the Surrey Crescent shop at 474 Great North Road. This Neo-Georgian building was designed by architect William Gummer, and was opened in December 1924 by the then Mayor Sir James Gunson. It continues to be used as a public library and community hall today, and the inside now includes murals painted by artist Murray Grimsdale.
- Former Cameo Cinema: Located at the Surrey Crescent shops, built in 1928, this Art-Deco building has been subdivided into several spaces and is occupied by a variety of businesses. The arched entrance is still a feature of the streetscape facing down Great North Road towards Western Springs.
- St Joseph's Church: Located on the Great North Road at Surrey Crescent. This modernist Roman Catholic Church from 1958 was designed by Guy Chambers and is distinguished by stained glass windows by Milan Mrkusich.
- St Joseph's Convent: Adjacent to the church on Great North Road is a school with modern buildings. One building is the former Convent built in the 1920s to replace an earlier wooden structure which burnt down. It is currently used as a hostel.

== Notable people ==
Notable people who have grown up, lived or worked in Grey Lynn include:

- Fred Bartram - politician
- Stella Bennett (also known as BENEE) - singer and songwriter
- Robert Bruce (wrestler)
- Samalulu Fuatino Te Aho Clifton - Olympic canoeist
- Tuva'a Clifton - Olympic canoeist
- Norman Douglas (politician)
- Dwayne Johnson (also known as The Rock) - WWE wrestler and actor
- Ray Lawless (New Zealand) - rugby league player
- Vincent O'Sullivan - writer
- Samani Pulepule - pastor
- The Midnights - reggae band
- James Wallis (New Zealand politician)

== Bibliography ==
- The Heart of Colonial Auckland, 1865–1910. Terence Hodgson. Random Century NZ Ltd 1992.
- Colonial Architecture In New Zealand. John Stacpoole. A.H & A.W Reed 1976
- Decently And In Order, The Centennial History of the Auckland City Council. G.W.A Bush. Collins 1971.
- Auckland Through A Victorian Lens. William Main. Millwood Press 1977.
- Ponsonby Heritage Walks. Tania Mace. Ponsonby Road Productions 2005.
- High hopes in hard times : a history of Grey Lynn and Westmere. Kaaren Hiyama. Media Studies Trust 1991.
