= Allendale (house) =

Heritage New Zealand category 1 historic place

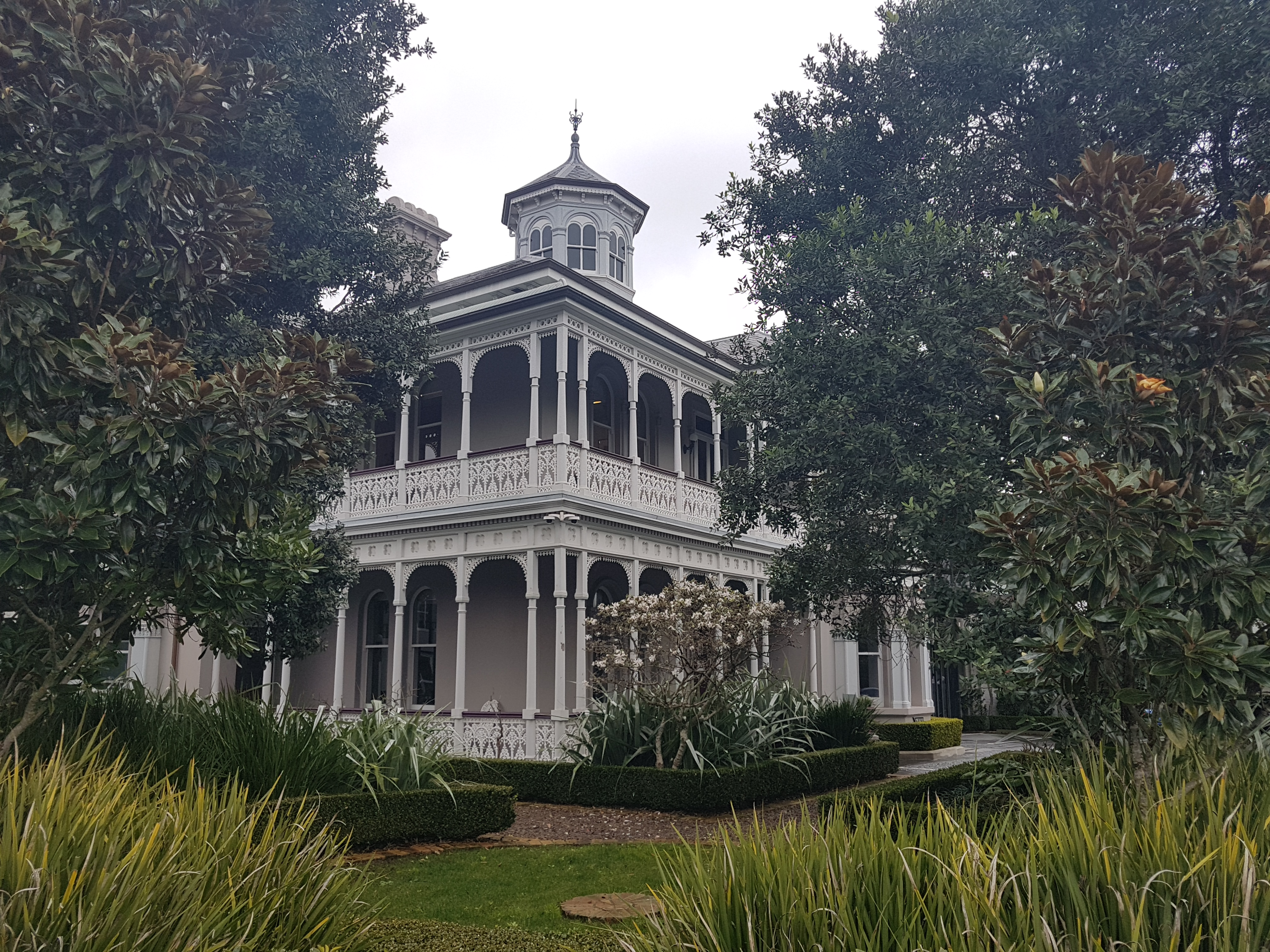
- Allendale from the corner of Crummer and Ponsonby Road

General information
- Architectural style: Italianate architecture
- Address: 50 Ponsonby Road, Grey Lynn, Auckland 1011, New Zealand
- Coordinates: 36°51′31.4″S 174°45′1.45″E
- Completed: 1893

Heritage New Zealand – Category 1
- Designated: 9 September 1989
- Reference no.: 628

Allendale is a 19th-century Italianate home in Grey Lynn, Auckland. Built as a home for a saddler in 1893, it has been used for a multitude of purposes. It is now a Heritage New Zealand category 1 historic place.

== History ==
Built in 1893, the building was originally constructed for George Allen, a saddler. It has been used as a doctor's surgery, a hostel for Māori women, a refuge for alcoholic men and Orsini's restaurant, and the Auckland Savings Bank Community Trust. For a time, it was also home for James Williamson, founder of New Zealand Insurance Co.

Foundation North, formerly the Auckland Savings Bank Community Trust engaged Salmond Reed Architects for a major restoration and refurbishment of Allendale, including the building of an annexe. This project received three awards:

- 2015 New Zealand Institute of Architects: Auckland Architecture Award - Commercial Category
- 2013 New Zealand Institutes of Architects: Auckland Architecture Awards - Heritage Category.
- 2013 Resene: Total Colour Awards - Colour Maestro Heritage Category.

== Description ==
It is a two-storey Italianate bay villa. The bay windows have double hung sash windows with pilasters with Corinthian capitals. It has wide verandahs on both floors with decorative valences and balustrades, and an octagonal belvedere on top of the house. The roof has slate tiles, and the verandahs have corrugated iron covers.

There have been multiple modifications to the building, especially in the interior since its construction in 1893. This notably includes an annexe, that was added to the building in 2013.

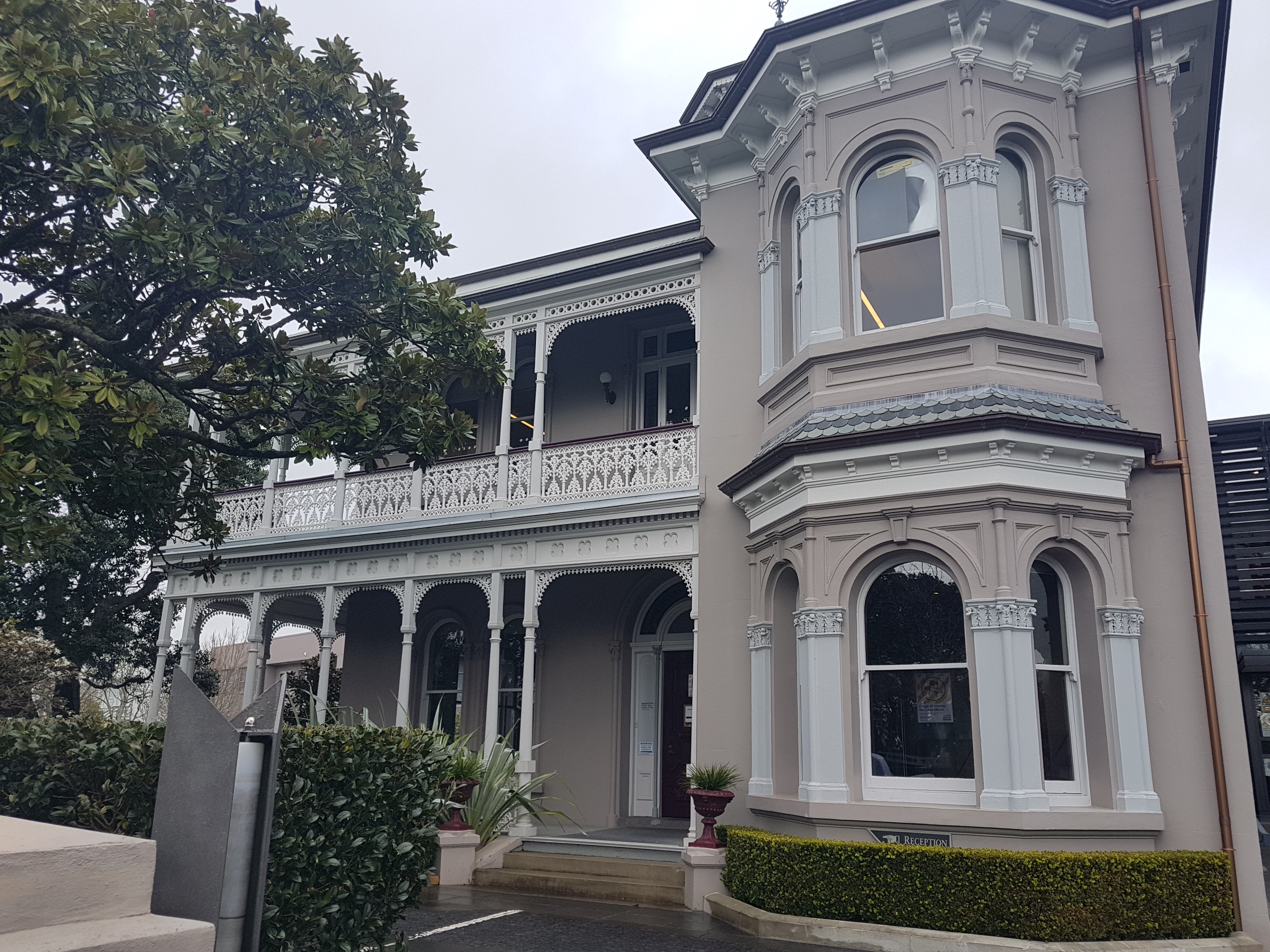
The entry to Allendale

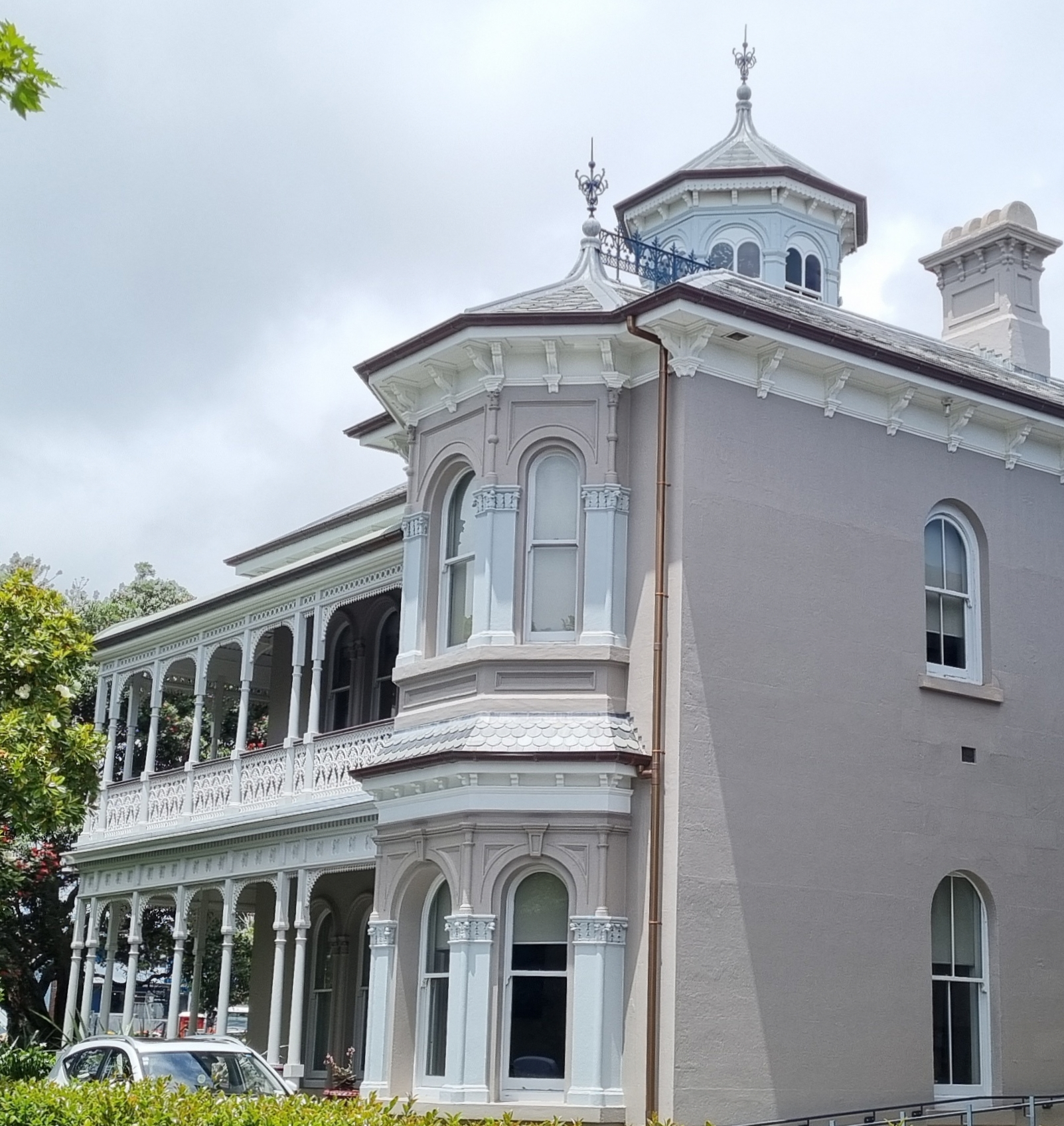
Allendale's double bay windows and octagonal belvedere.

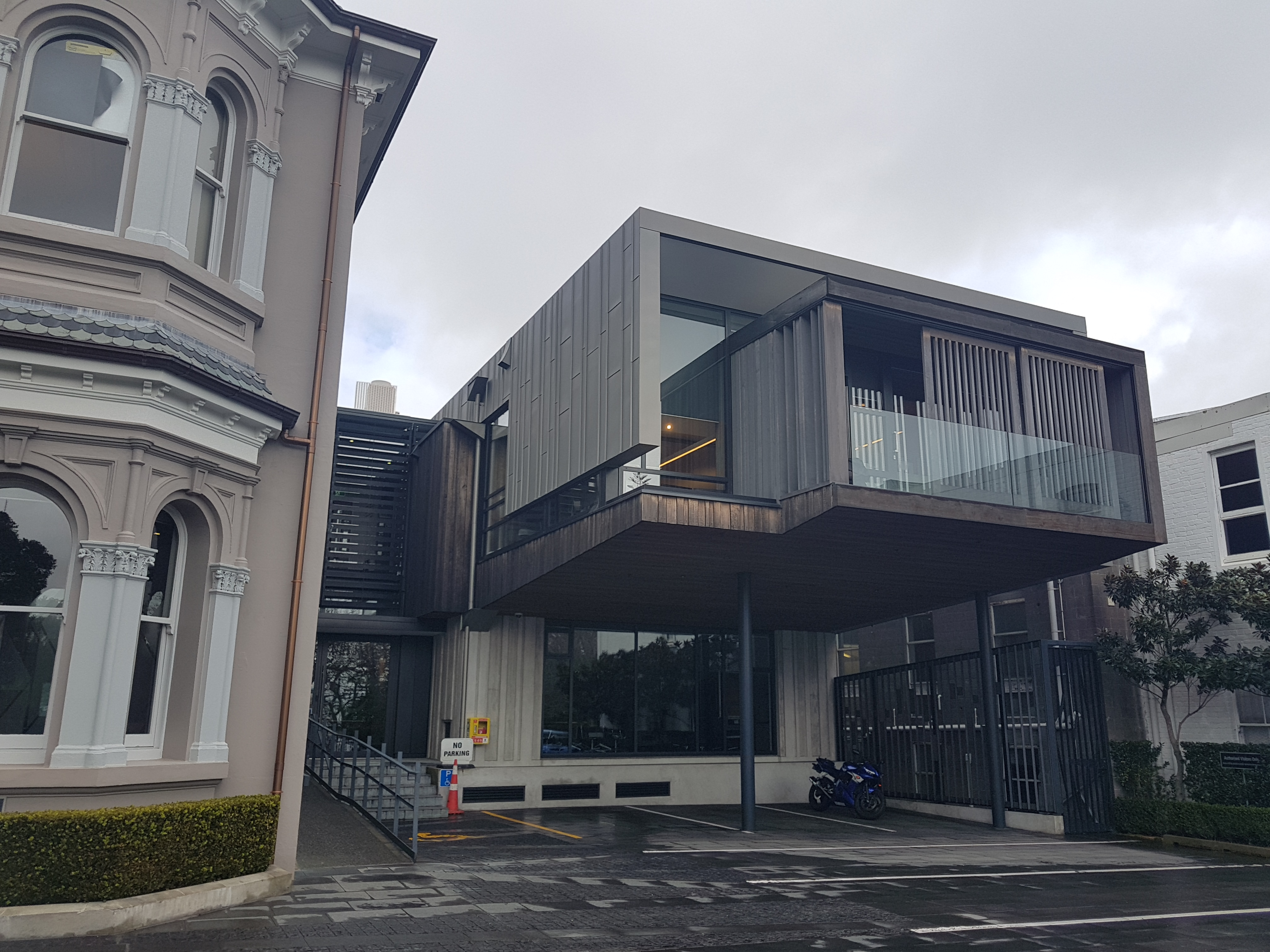
The annexe built in 2013.
