= Grey Lynn Council Chambers and Fire Station =

Former municipal building in Auckland

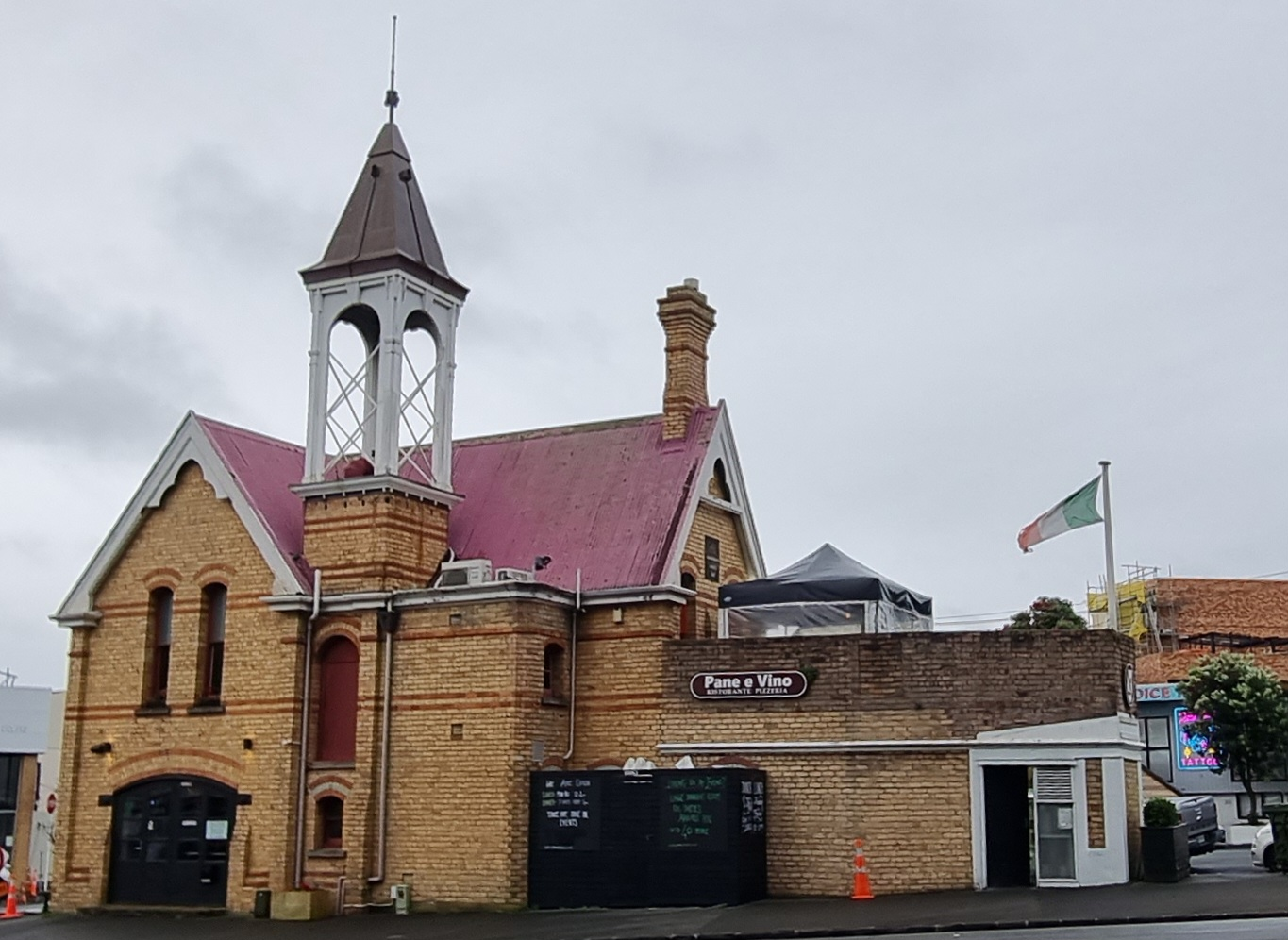
- The Grey Lynn Council Chambers and Fire Station in 2009
- Alternative names: Newton Borough Council Chambers and Fire Station

General information
- Type: Municipal building
- Location: 1 Williamson Avenue, Grey Lynn
- Coordinates: 36.85830°S 174.74815°E
- Year built: 1889
- Cost: £420

Technical details
- Size: 151 m^{2} (1,630 sq ft)
- Floor area: 65 m^{2} (700 sq ft) (top floor)

Design and construction
- Architect: John Mitchell

Heritage New Zealand – Category 2
- Designated: 12 December 2005
- Reference no.: 572

The Grey Lynn Council Chambers and Fire Station is a late-Victorian former municipal building in Grey Lynn, Auckland, New Zealand. Designed by John Mitchell as a dual-purpose council chambers and fire station for the Newton Borough Council (later Grey Lynn Borough Council). The building is registered as a category 2 historic building.

== Description ==
The Council Chambers and Fire Station c.1890

The Council Chambers and Fire Station sits near the top of the Ponsonby ridge and overlooks most of Grey Lynn. The 151 m^{2} (1,630 sq ft) lot is isolated and surrounded by three different roads on each side. The ground floor housed the fire brigade whilst the upper floor housed the council chambers. The floors were not internally connected and a staircase on the outside was used to reach the top floor. A bell tower is located on the south side which was used to alert the fire brigade when a fire had broken out. The bell tower was originally removed prior to 1915 but was restored in 1985.

The walls are yellow brick with orange brick banding to give it ornamentation. The bricks alongside decorated bargeboards, corbelled chimney, and steep roof are a combination of Gothic architecture of churches and contemporary domestic villas. The windows are long and double hung sash windows. The roofing is corrugated iron. The façade is identical on the north and south sides. The garage containing the fire engine has doors at both Williamson Avenue and Rose Road.

The original structure is two storey and t-shaped whilst the addition is wedge shaped and single storey, with a deck on top. The fire appliance room serves a café, the interior of the original building is mostly a toilet and staircase to the top floor, and the eastern extension serves as a kitchen. The top floor is a restaurant that opens up to a deck on the eastern extension. The top floor is 65 m^{2} (700 sq ft). Some original interior features such as a trough for washing hoses and cove ceilings remain. The interior has "polished timber floorboards, timber panel walls, vaulted ceilings, ornate fireplaces and timber frame sash windows".

== History ==
The Newton Borough Council was formed in November 1885 taking over from the Newton Highway Board. Originally the council operated out of an office on Great North Road. The borough council wished to have its own premises and in March 1877 plans from John Mitchell were approved; however, the tenders were too dear and the design was modified to reduce the cost by £50 10s. In early 1889 a volunteer fire brigade was established in Newton, this brigade operated out of the Karangahape Fire Station, which at the time was part of the City of Auckland. It was decided that a dual-purpose building that would house both the council and fire brigade be constructed. The final tenders came in by 29 April 1889 and construction started May 1889 taking approximately 4 months. The final building cost £420 with £125 for the land. The first council meeting in their new building was held on 2 September 1889, the mayor of Newton, S. J. Ambury praised the building as being "second to none" in Auckland.

In August 1899 the Newton Borough Council was renamed Grey Lynn Borough Council after Sir George Grey. In 1914 the Grey Lynn Borough was amalgamated with the City of Auckland. The Auckland Fire Board took over the bottom floor in March 1914, and in July that year the council chambers were no longer in use. The property was purchased by the Auckland Fire Board in March 1917 who added an eastern extension to house firemen and a 30 horsepower Daimler vehicle.

The fire station was closed in 1923 following the completion of the Western Districts Fire Station in Ponsonby. John Fenton purchased the property in January 1924 and let the ground floor to a carriage painting business. A year later that property was purchased by Margaret Teasedale, who had the eastern extension further extended and used the property as a shop and bake house with the top floor as accommodation. In 1941 James Roche purchased the property and converted it into three separate flats. 12 years later the property was purchased by architect Reginald Dewar Morgan who owned it for two decades before selling it to Landmark Incorporated, an entity created specifically to purchase and preserve the Council Chambers and Fire Station. Landmark Incorporated restored and reopened the building as a restaurant in April 1974. Landmark Incorporated still own the property and a restaurant operates out of the building as of 2005.
