= Church of Our Lady of the Assumption, Onehunga =

Catholic church in Onehunga, New Zealand

Church of Our Lady of the Assumption
- Church of the Assumption
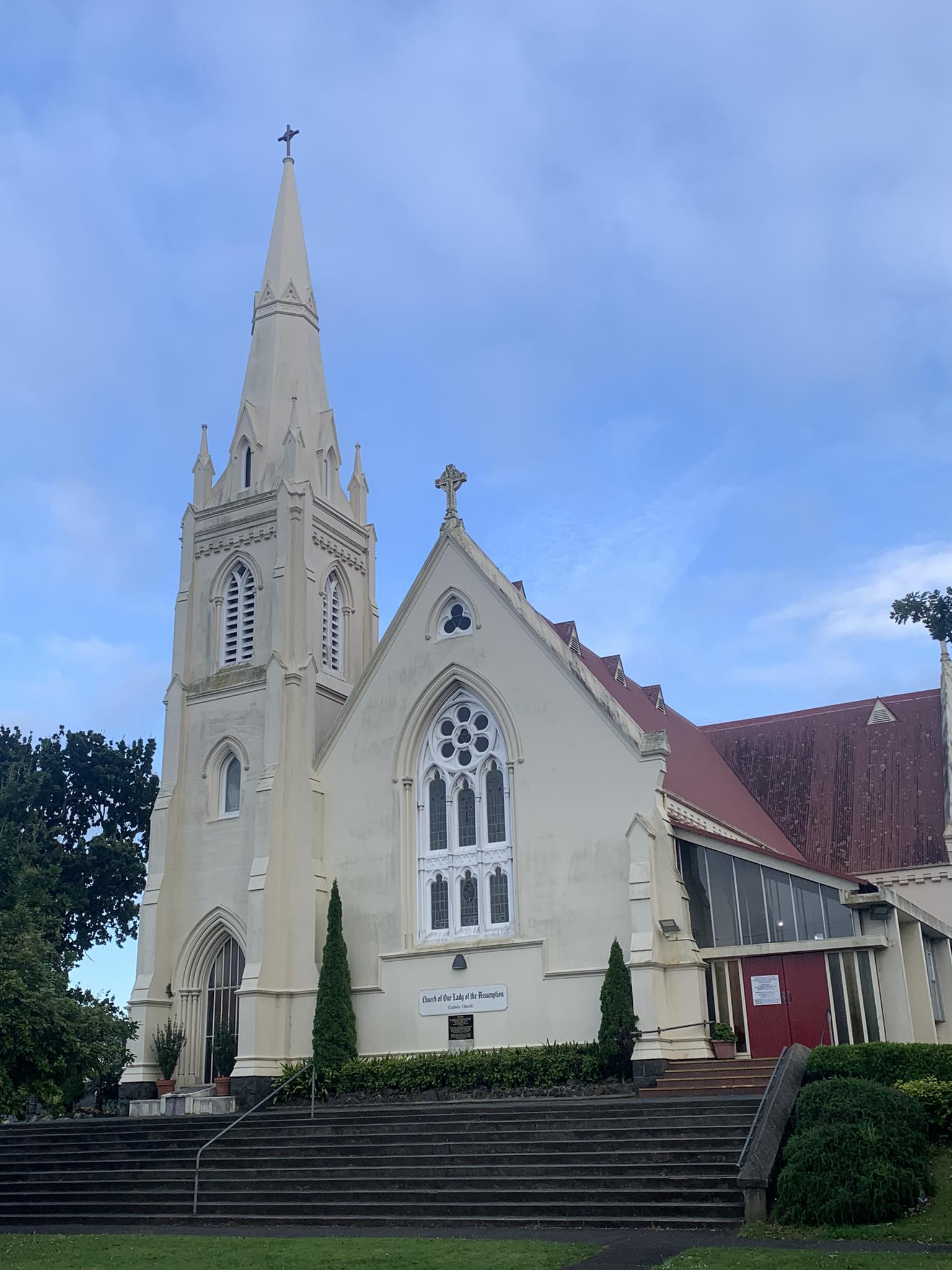
- Front of Our Lady of the Assumption
- Location: Cnr of Church and Galway Street, Onehunga, New Zealand
- Denomination: Catholic
- Website: https://onehungacatholic.org.nz/

History
- Dedication: Our Lady of the Assumption
- Earlier dedication: St Mary

Architecture
- Architect: Thomas Mahoney
- Style: Gothic Revival
- Years built: 1887–1889

Administration
- Diocese: Auckland

Heritage New Zealand – Category 2
- Designated: 4 April 1983
- Reference no.: 523

The Church of Our Lady of the Assumption, also known as The Church of the Assumption, is a heritage-listed Catholic church located in Onehunga, Auckland, New Zealand. It is situated on the corner of Church and Galway Street. Built between 1887 and 1889 the church is situated within a 1840s Catholic cemetery.

The church is registered as a category 2 building with Heritage New Zealand and scheduled with Auckland Council due to its connection to the early history of Onehunga, its association with one of the oldest Catholic parishes in Auckland, the association with prominent Catholics such as Bishop of Auckland John Luck, and its aesthetic quality and status as a landmark of Onehunga.

== Description ==
The Church of Our Lady of the Assumption was designed by Thomas Mahoney, a prominent Catholic architect, in the English Gothic Revival style. Joan McKenzie writes that the design of the church is a step in between the 1885 nave and tower of St Patrick's Cathedral, Auckland and its completed form in 1907. The foundation of the church was made from locally quarried basalt and filled with concrete, with the exterior being brick finished with a Portland cement plaster. The building shares similarities with St Patrick's Cathedral such as the degree of the pitched roof, the buttressing, broached spire, and lancet arch. The church is a landmark within Onehunga.

== History ==
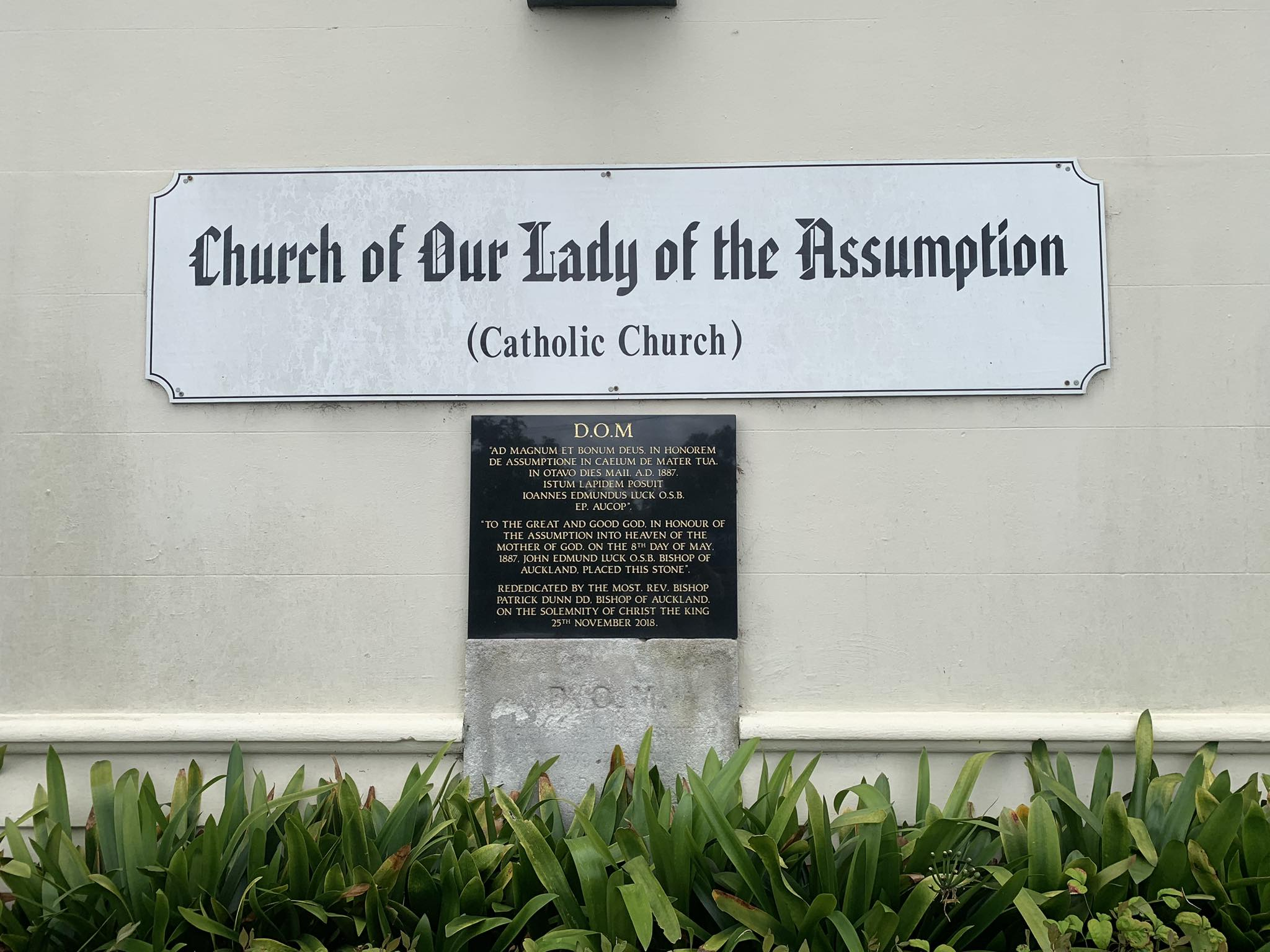
Signage at Church of Our Lady of Assumption, 2023

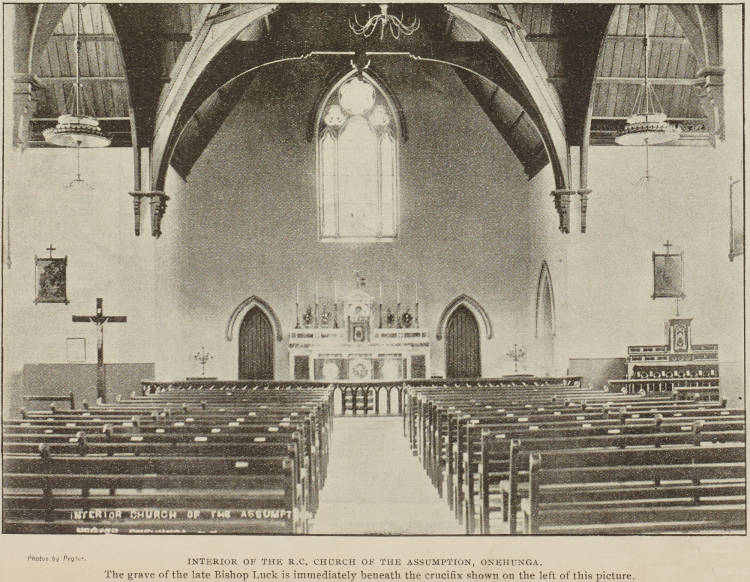
Interior of the Church of Our Lady of the Assumption, 1896

Onehunga was established as a fencible settlement in 1847. The first Catholic service was held in the afternoon of 21 November 1847, the same day as the arrival of the first fencibles. Many of the fencibles came from Ireland leading to a majority Catholic population in Onehunga. A catholic cemetery was soon established at the corner of Church and Galway Street and was consecrated in 1848. The first Catholic church was built opposite this cemetery in 1851; St Mary's was a simple Gothic Revival timber church. The first parish priest was Father Clery in 1850. Father James Paul was appointed to the parish in 1858 — under Father Paul a convent, hall, and school were constructed on the churchyard.

The growth of the settlement of Onehunga led to the congregation outgrowing St Mary's; Thomas Mahoney was hired to design a new church on the same site as the cemetery for the growing congregation. Mahoney's practice, Edward Mahoney and Sons, was the preferred architect of the Auckland Diocese. Parishioner William Kemp (Note: Name is also given as Joseph Kemp) was awarded the contract; Kemp was a stonemason and familiar with the materials used in the construction. In May 1887 the Bishop of Auckland John Edmund Luck laid the foundation stone. Construction of the new church was completed in 1889. The English Gothic Revival structure could seat 600 and features a nave, transepts, chancel, sacristies, and an oratory for the Sisters of Mercy. The spire began construction 1902 and was completed in 1903.

Father Paul supported the establishment of the secular Waikaraka Cemetery — at the time there were concerns around hygiene and the church cemetery. A mass was celebrated for the Catholic soldiers of the 9th contingent in March 1902 before the men's departure to fight in the Anglo Boer War.

Bishop Luck was interred in the western transept after his death in 1896. Father Paul was interred in 1905 and William Kemp in 1906. Father Paul was succeeded by William Mahoney, relative of Thomas Mahoney and the first New Zealand-born Catholic priest. Mahoney would serve the parish for 20 years.

Following the reforms of the Second Vatican Council the church underwent serious transformation in 1970: the high altar was removed, a foyer was constructed on the east of the building, the front entrance was blocked off, the gallery was replaced, the oratory was repurposed, and the confessional boxes were removed. The modernisations continued in c.2006 with a hall constructed onto the north side of the building.

== Presbytery ==
A presbytery was constructed in the churchyard in 1906 by William Kemp Jr, Kemp's father constructed the church.

== Catholic school ==
Catholic education in Onehunga was initially carried out by Father Seon in his own home. In July 1848 a schoolhouse was constructed but due to high demand services move to St Mary's Church after its completion. The Sisters of Mercy established a school in 1864 on a Galway Street cottage before moving into a purpose-built structure in St Mary's churchyard. The Sisters of Mercy school remained in that location until 1960 when the building was demolished. The non-convent Catholic school moved into the new church afters its construction. In 1924 the school moved into a Church Street property until 1984 when it was demolished.
