= List of former staff of St Peter's College, Auckland =

St Peter's College (including its predecessor school St Peter's School), a secondary school in Auckland, New Zealand, has employed many notable faculty and staff.

Approximately ninety Christian Brothers were associated with St Peter's College from 1939 until 2007.

== Notable staff and patrons ==
- John Ackland – history teacher and as of 2019 taught in the commerce faculty; rugby league player in the Kiwis in 1983
- Jim Anderton CNZM (1938–2018) – politician, Deputy Prime Minister in the Fifth Labour Government (1999–2002); taught in the intermediate (the middle school) at St Peters in 1959 and 1960
- Ken Arvidson (1938–2011) – poet and academic; taught senior English at St Peter's College 1960–1963, Notably, he taught poets Sam Hunt and Terry Locke
- Bro Dominic Fursey Bodkin c.f.c. – (1843–1929) – established Christian Brothers in NZ; eponym of Bodkin House at St Peter's.
- John Logan Campbell (1817–1912) – donor of the Pitt St site of St Peter's School.
- Mike Chunn CNZM (born 1952) – founding member of Split Enz; taught at St Peter's College in 1977
- Reginald Delargey (1914–1979), Archbishop and cardinal – St Peter's College school chaplain for 18 years (1940s–1950s).
- Patrick Dignan (1814–1894) – Member of Parliament, and member of the Board of Governors of St Peter's School
- Felix Donnelly ONZM (1929–2019) – priest, social activist, writer, academic and radio talkback host – school chaplain in 1960s.
- Br William Hofbauer (Bill) Dowling (1939-2024) - taught at St Peter's in 1962 in the junior school and from 1964 to 1975 at secondary level. "He saw each pupil as an individual with a family and a variety of interests and skills beyond what he was teaching them. 50 years later a group of these students brought him back to Auckland to celebrate those years of teaching and friendship."
- Paul Farmer, priest, monsignor – chaplain of St Peter's College in the 1970s and currently (as at 2021).
- Kieran Fouhy MNZM – long-serving Headmaster of St Peter's College, 1989–2015
- Ken Gorbey CNZM (born 1942) – Museum designer: of Te Papa and the Jewish Museum Berlin; taught Geography to senior classes at St Peter's in 1967.
- Bro Michael Benignus Hanrahan c.f.c. – Provincial of the Christian Brothers; provided Christian Brothers to staff St Peter's in 1939.
- Grant Hansen – Deputy Headmaster (2016–present), Rugby union coach of the Black Ferns 2009.
- Bro Vincent Michael Innocent Jury c.f.c. – (1933–2023) B.Sc (Hons) (in pure and applied mathematics) (Sydney); M.Sc(?) (Otago?) (1962); BA (1970); Dip.Ed: old boy of St Peter's College; taught at St Peter's College 1967–1974; Principal of two secondary schools (St Thomas of Canterbury College and Trinity Catholic College, Dunedin); pastoral worker and community adult education administrator and teacher (also established a community radio station and a youth centre), Christian Brothers outreach, the Edmund Rice Community, in Murupara, Bay of Plenty (1992—2008).
- Pat Lam – All Black, loose forward (1992), teacher at St Peter's College (1991–1992)
- Peter Leonard – a teacher at St Peter's School in the 1870s and 1880s and went on to teach at other early schools in Auckland
- Archbishop James Liston CMG (1881–1976) – 7th Roman Catholic Bishop of Auckland – founder and funder of St Peter's College.
- Peter Lyons (1965–2020) – economics teacher at St Peter's College (2007–2020); media commentator on economic issues
- Br James Bonaventure Lynch (1908—1995) B.A. leading Physics teacher at St Peter's 1960s and 1970s; subject of Sam Hunt's poem, "Brother Lynch".
- Kevin Malloy – advertising chief executive, member St Peter's College Board of Trustees in 2015
- Bro Thomas Monagle c.f.c. (1928–1983) – founder of the St Peter's College railway station in 1964.
- Bro Francis Pius O'Driscoll c.f.c. (died 1964) – foundation headmaster of St Peter's College (1939–1944).
- Richard James O'Sullivan (1826–1889) – a teacher at St Peter's School and a school inspector
- Isa Outhwaite (1842–1925) – watercolour artist, poet social activist and philanthropist – donor of the St Peter's College site and first funder of the college.
- Archbishop Giovanni Panico, Apostolic Delegate, ruled that Bishop Liston could invite the Christian Brothers to staff St Peter's College.
- Edmund Powell – classes were first held in Powell's residence in Shortland Crescent on 27 September 1841
- Nicholas Reid (born 1951) – poet; historian; book and film reviewer; was a philosophy and theology teacher at St Peter's, and also taught public speaking and debating 2008–2018
- Bro Patrick Celestine Ryan c.f.c. (1909–1996) – Headmaster of St Peter's 1957–1965; creator of The Cage.
- Bro Benjamin Everard Ryan c.f.c. – Headmaster of St Peter's 1966–1974; a great builder.
- Pio Terei MNZM (born 1958) – actor, singer and comedian on New Zealand television – as at 2010 he was a member (representing parents) on the St Peter's College Board of Trustees
- Bro Patrick Ambrose Treacy c.f.c. (1834–1912) – established Christian Brothers in Australia; eponym of Treacy House at St Peter's.
- Bro Peter Watt c.f.c. – a teacher at St Peter's 1969–1972; 1980; and 1986–2016; cricket coach and eponym of Watty's Nets.
- Tom Weal (1929–2016) – teacher at St Peter's College (1954–1957, 1959–1989); also a New Zealand politician for the Social Credit Party, the New Democratic Party and the short lived Christian Democrat party
- Bro Lawrence Wilkes c.f.c. – at the school over 40 years until mid-1990s; Technical Drawing specialist; he introduced Young Christian Students (YCS) programmes in the college and commenced the college's service programme.

== See also ==
- Congregation of Christian Brothers in New Zealand
- List of people educated at St Peter's College, Auckland
