= St Peter's College, Auckland =

School in Auckland, New Zealand

St Peter's College
- Māori: Te Kura Teitei o Hāto Petera

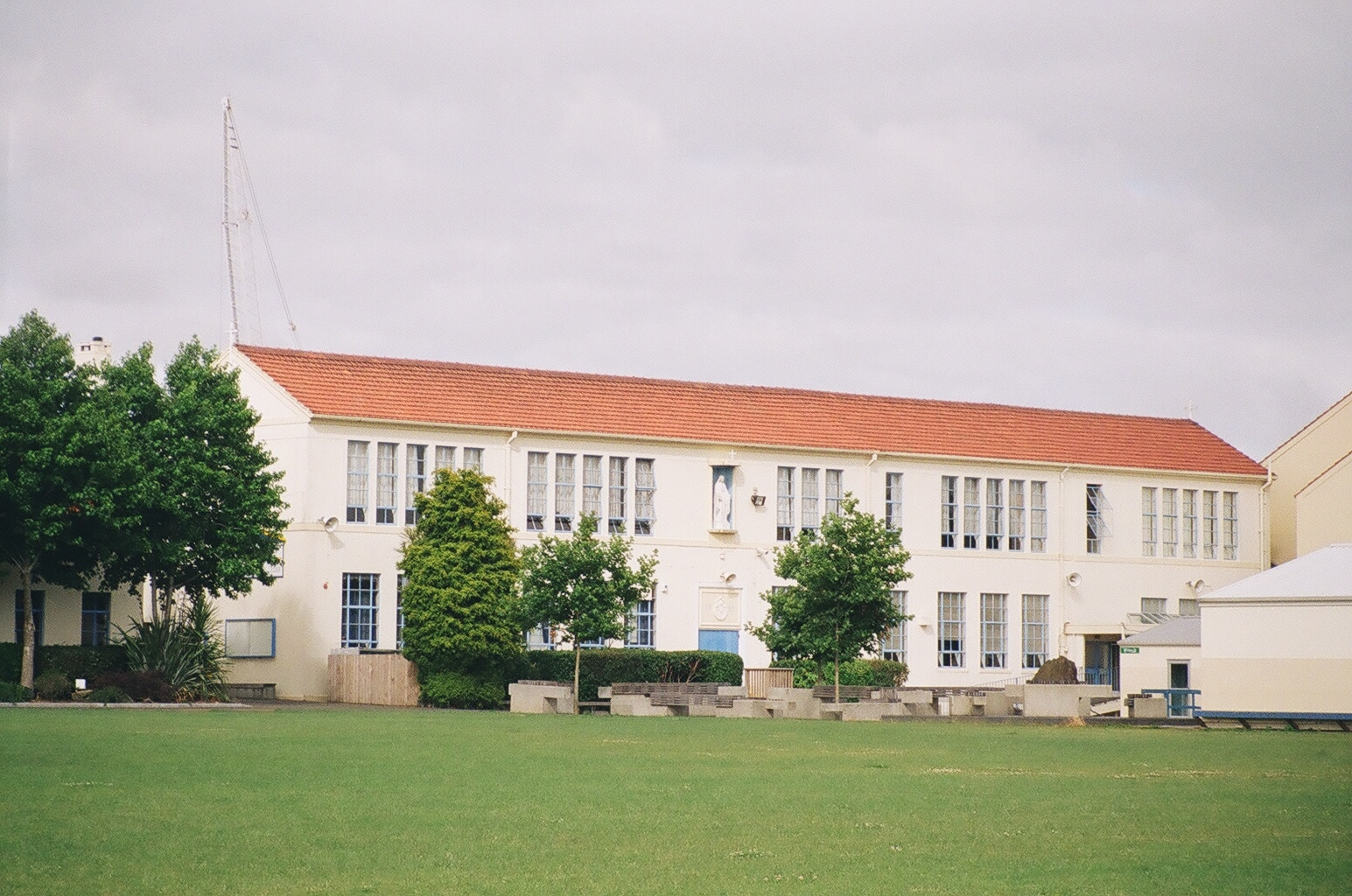
- St Peter's College (Br. O'Driscoll Building, 2009) (opened 1939)

Location
- 23 Mountain Road, Grafton; Auckland, 1023; New Zealand; 36°52′3″S 174°46′8″E

Information
- Type: State-integrated, boys intermediate and secondary
- Motto: ‘To Love and to Serve’
- Religious affiliation: Catholic
- Patron saint: Saint Peter
- Established: 1939; 87 years ago (original schools founded 1841 and 1857)
- Ministry of Education Institution no.: 62
- Chair: Katrina Gardiner
- Headmaster: James Bentley
- Years offered: 7–13
- Gender: Boys
- Enrolment: 1,318 (July 2026)
- Socio-economic decile: 8P
- Alumni name: Old Boys
- Website: www.st-peters.school.nz

St Peter's College (Māori: Te Kura Teitei o Hāto Petera) is a Catholic secondary school for boys in the Edmund Rice tradition, and dedicated to St Peter. The proprietor of the school is the Catholic Bishop of Auckland. It is located in the central Auckland area of Grafton, Auckland, New Zealand. With a roll of over 1300 it is one of the largest Catholic schools in New Zealand. St Peter's College was established in 1939 as a successor of Auckland's earliest school (Mr Powell's School, established in 1841) and of St Peter's School, founded in 1857. However, there was also another Catholic secondary school dedicated to St Peter, Hato Petera College or St Peter's Māori College, which existed for 90 years from 1928 until 2018 in Northcote.

The Outhwaite family, who acquired the Mountain Rd land around 1841, donated the site of St Peter's College. The Christian Brothers provided staff for the college for 70 years.

St Peter's is the oldest existing Catholic boys' school in Auckland still on its original site.^{[note a]} For nearly 50 years, the school had direct access to an adjacent railway station, specifically created for the college and known initially as the "St Peter's College station". The school was integrated into the state system along with 240 other New Zealand Catholic schools in 1982.

== History ==
=== The original schools ===
==== Mr Powell's School (1841) ====
Auckland's first school was a Catholic school for boys, that commenced on 27 September 1841. It was established by Catholic laymen of Auckland following the first visit of Bishop Pompallier. The teacher was Edmund Powell (who was a leading layman also involved in building St Patrick's Church, later consecrated as a cathedral), and classes were first held in his home in Shortland Crescent. This school appears to have existed only for a short time.

==== St Peter's School (1857–1885) ====
In 1857, St Peter's School was established by a group of laymen (Messrs Coolahan, Boylan, Dignan, McGauran and O'Rafferty) led by Father O'Hara, the curate at St Patrick's Cathedral, as Auckland's first Catholic secondary school for boys. In that year Bishop Pompallier prepared a list of church schools for the Government and for "propaganda" which stated: "St Peter's Select School is established for the more advanced boys. The Greek, Latin, French, Italian and German languages are taught in it, also Geometry, Mensuration, Arithmetic, Geography, English Grammar etc ... Terms per Annum 12.0.0 for each pupil." The school had a board of governors composed of its founders which included the Member of Parliament, Patrick Dignan. Classes commenced in rented accommodation, probably in Drake St, Freemans Bay. John Logan Campbell donated a sum of £500 and a block of land on the corner of Pitt and Wellington Streets. A brick school building was built there. The founding teacher was Richard O'Sullivan and, during his tenure, the school was often identified with him (St Peter's boys were said to be "educated by Richard O'Sullivan" rather than by the school). Amongst his students were John Sheehan, Joseph Tole, Peter Dignan and Charles and William Outhwaite. O'Sullivan resigned in 1861. In 1865 the teacher was Peter Morand.

Bishop Pompallier made an annual inspection of the school. On 16 December 1864 he visited the school along with some priests and many parents. The proceedings were commenced by an address "to the Right Reverend Dr Pompallier, Bishop of Auckland", delivered by a pupil, Laurence Lorigan, on behalf of all the pupil's.

Earlier in 1864, St Peter's School gave an address to Bishop Pompallier on his feast day, the feast of St John the Baptist. That address was delivered by Martin Maher on behalf of the pupils.

St Peter's School was also prominent in St Patrick's Day celebrations. On Friday 17 March 1865, St Peter's boys together with pupils of other Catholic schools began their celebrations with a Pontifical High Mass whose principal celebrant was Bishop Pompallier, in the cathedral. After addresses to the Bishop, the pupils went to the "paddocks" of Peter Grace Esq where "the sports for the youths consisted of feats of bat and ball, football etc. etc. A very spirited cricket match came off between 11 students of St Francis de Sales School (a girls' school) and a corresponding number of St Peter's School, the former being the victors in the game". In 1867 the celebration occurred on Monday 18 March. After Mass, the addresses to the bishop were read by a pupil of St Patrick's School and by "Master Anthony [Patrick] Martin, son of Mr Anthony Martin of Hobson St" on behalf of St Peter's. The pupils then went to paddocks of Mr Dinnin on Ponsonby Road for sports, entertainments and "refreshments".

In the 1870s and 1880s, Mr B Hammill was a well-known teacher. He was said to have a "first-class certificate from the Irish Board of Education" and to be "enthusiastically devoted to his profession". Mr Peter Leonard was another prominent teacher who went on to teach at other schools in Auckland. In 1874, a report of the annual public examination of the boys attending St Peter's, presided over by Bishop Croke, stated that there was a "regular and good" attendance of about 70 pupils at the school. In 1879 St Peter's had a roll of 43. In 1881, Mr Cronin (who had "high certificates from the Irish and Auckland Education Boards") was a teacher at St Peter's School which in an advertisement for pupils also offered night classes ("7-9pm") to prepare pupils for "mercantile pursuits, civil service and teacher's examinations".

In about 1884, St Peter's started to use a larger adjacent building as the number of pupils was exceeding the capacity of the brick school. In October 1884, William Mahoney, who received all his early education under Mr Hammill at St Peter's, paid a visit to the school on his return to New Zealand as a priest. He was Auckland's first New-Zealand-born priest. St Peter's School continued (largely, by then a primary school) until the Marist Brothers established their own school on the site in 1885.

=== Troubled establishment ===
Walter Steins S.J., third Catholic Bishop of Auckland (1879–1881) thought, that as they were a French congregation, the Marist Brothers might not be welcome in Auckland and that it would be better to invite the Irish Christian Brothers as most of the Catholics in Auckland were Irish. Steins's successor, the Englishman John Luck OSB, fourth Catholic Bishop of Auckland (1881–1896), had no such qualms and invited the Marist Brothers to establish their school. An unsuccessful move may have been made in 1885 to open a Christian Brothers School.

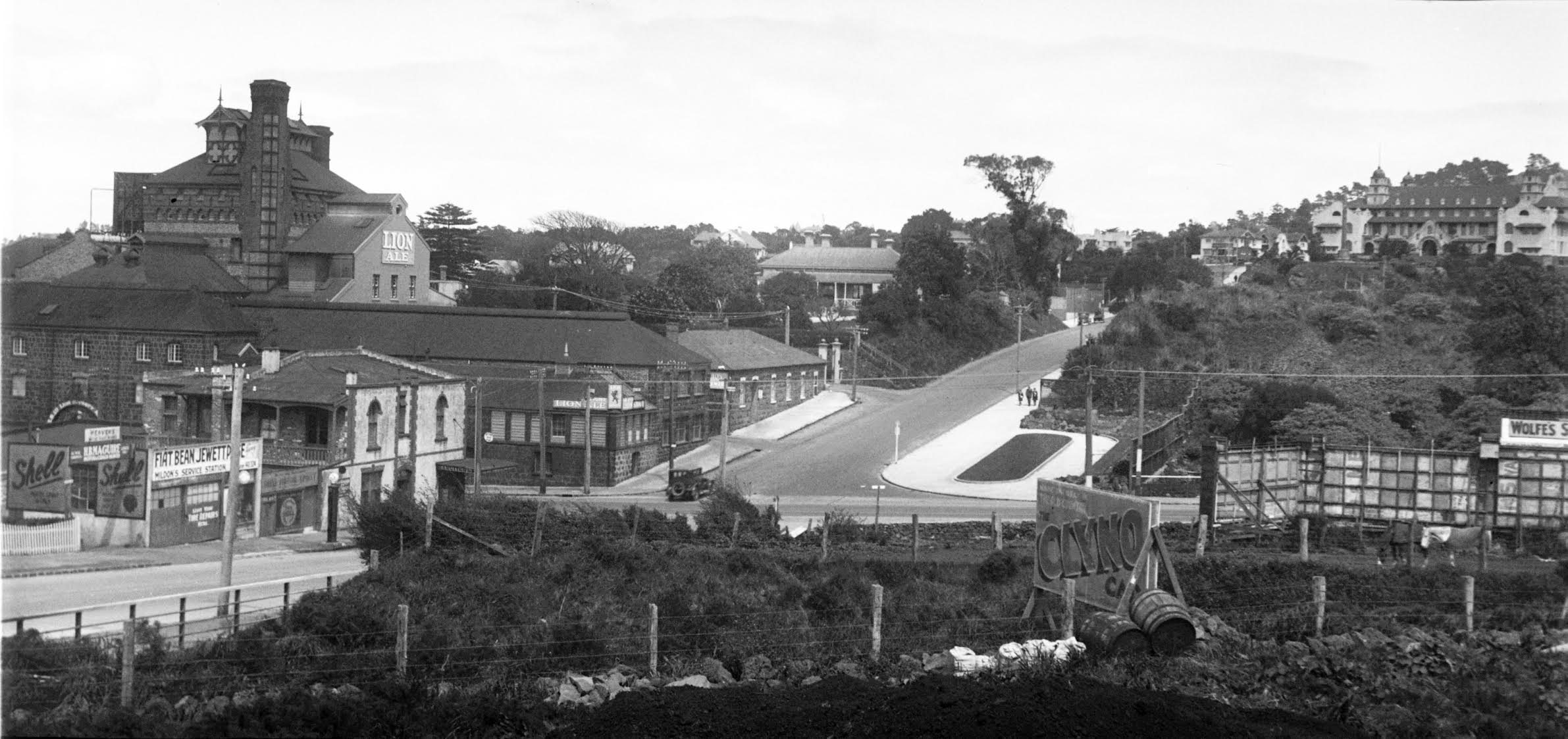
Site of St Peter's College on right of Mountain Rd (Lion Brewery on left) before it was cleared for the school; photographs taken from the site of the Outhwaite family house (Outhwaite Park) (1929)

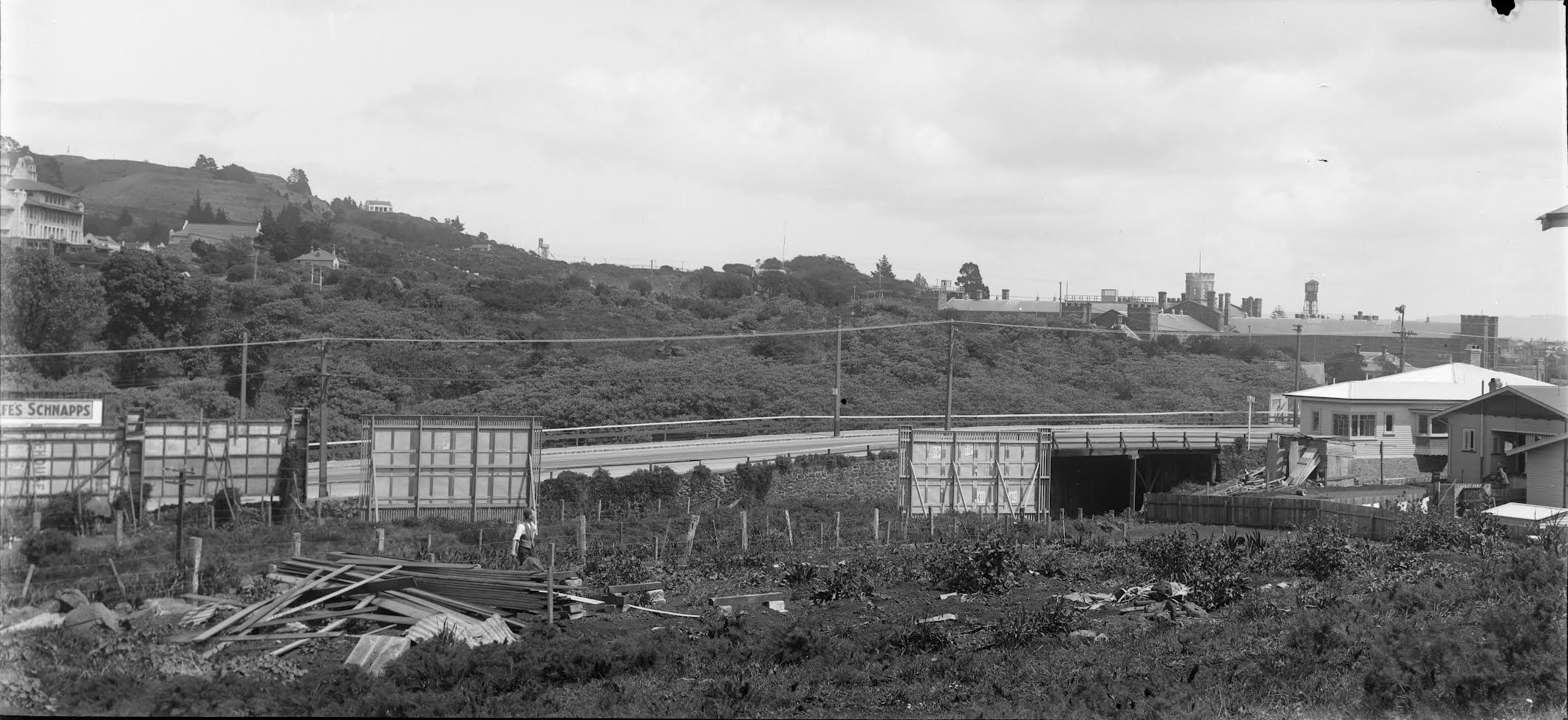
continuation of the panoramic of future site of St Peter's College before it was cleared for the school; Mt Eden Prison on right, (1929)

Nearly 40 years later, in 1923, Henry Cleary, the sixth Catholic Bishop of Auckland, issued an invitation to the Christian Brothers to found a school. The Marist Brothers, well established at Sacred Heart College (then located in Richmond Road, Ponsonby), objected strongly and Cleary wrote to the Provincial of the Christian Brothers, Brother Barron, changing his offer to a primary school. As a result, the Christian Brothers lost interest.

Shortly after he became seventh Catholic Bishop of Auckland in 1929, James Liston renewed the invitation to the Christian Brothers, whose pupil he had been in Dunedin. This again aroused the opposition of the Marist Brothers. They were concerned that a new boys' Form I to VI school would take enrolments from Sacred Heart College and would diminish their revenue. Unmoved by the Marist Brothers' opposition, Liston requested his old Dunedin classmate, Brother Michael James Benignus Hanrahan (Brother Benignus), the Christian Brothers provincial, to provide brothers to staff the school. This was agreed to.

A contractor cleared the Mountain Road site in 1931 and it was expected that the school would open in 1933. But financial problems caused delays. The Marist Brothers appealed to the Apostolic Delegate to Australia and New Zealand, resident in Sydney, and to the Sacred Congregation of Religious in Rome.

They believed that Bishop Cleary had promised them the St Peter's School site but as no written record could be found, Bishop Liston was informed by the Sacred Congregation that he could invite the Christian Brothers and the Apostolic Delegate, Archbishop Giovanni Panico, ruled "that the Bishop is free to make whatever provision he may decide in the matter". The Marist Brothers accepted this ruling, but unhappily.^{[note b]}^{[note c]}

=== Outhwaite donation, construction and opening ===
The school was constructed on the corner of Khyber Pass Road and Mountain Road, a site which had been given to the church for educational purposes by the Outhwaite family a pioneering family of Auckland. The family acquired the site in 1841. Isa Outhwaite, the last surviving member of that family, bequeathed the site of the college and also a part of the fund required for its erection.^{[note d]} The Outhwaites, who lived nearby, had pastured livestock on the site. The dedication of the college to St Peter was not only a specific revival of the earlier St Peter's School in Auckland, but also referred to the first Catholic school in New Zealand opened in Kororareka in 1840 and dedicated to St Peter. The foundation also commemorated the beginning of the Catholic Church in New Zealand in 1838 when Bishop Pompallier arrived in New Zealand and set up the Marist Mission in the Bay of Islands.

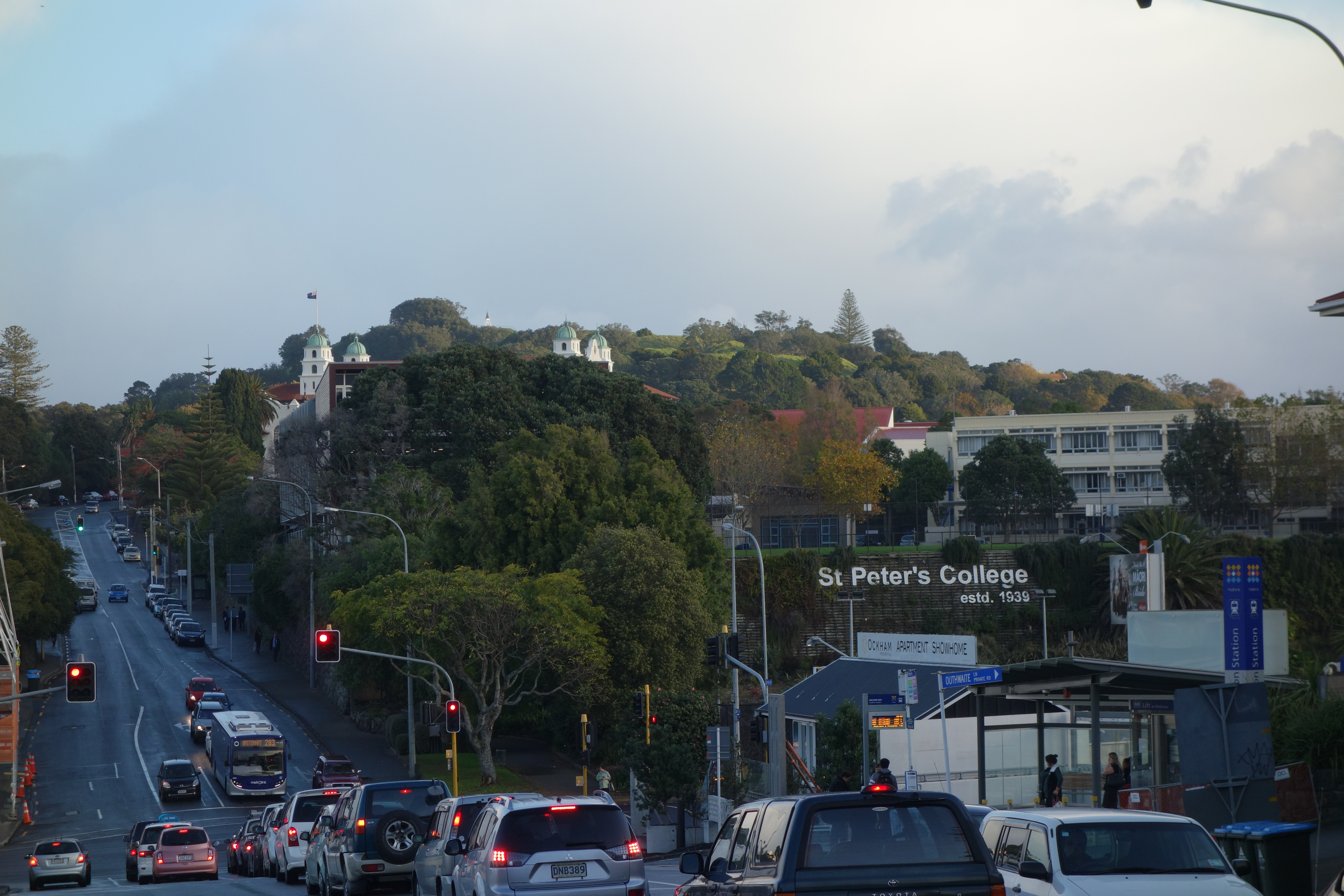
St Peter's College taken from near Outhwaite Park (2015)

The Christian Brothers arrived in Auckland from Australia and the South Island for the 1939 school year. They were accommodated by the parish priest of Remuera, Monsignor J. J. Bradley, in his presbytery until the Brothers' residence was habitable. Bradley, who had been a pupil of the Christian Brothers in Ireland, was responsible for the laying out of the grounds of the school, which took ten months to complete. However, work continued until 1941 on the development of Reeves Road (a street that later disappeared as it was incorporated as the entrance to St. Peter's College),^{[note e]} the building of stone walls, and the very significant soil transfer from the netball courts to level the playing fields was accomplished largely by workers on the Government Relief scheme following the Great Depression.

These workers worked on the project for three years and finished it on 1 November 1941. The school grounds consisted of three different levels, i.e. the netball court level^{[note f]} (from 2010, the site of the St Peter's Sports Complex), the old tennis court level (later filled in under the playing field level) and the playing field level (called the "St Peter's College oval"). Originally, the quadrangle of the college was not paved but was covered in heavy ash from the Auckland Gas works in Freemans Bay.

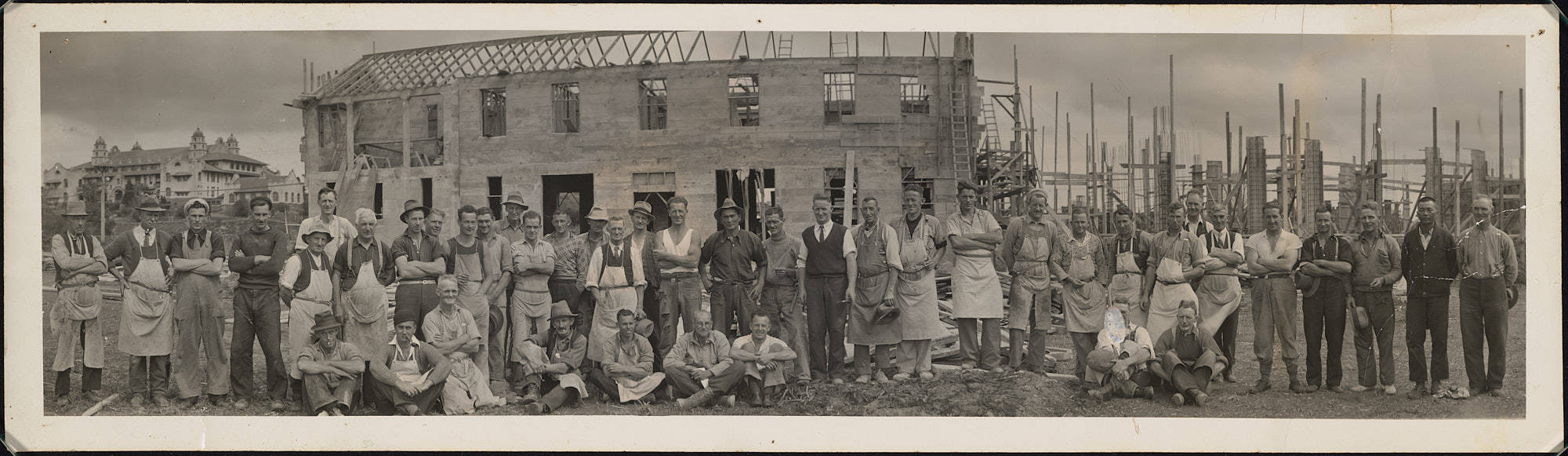
The construction of the Christian Brothers' House, St Peter's College, Auckland, 1938

The school was opened on Sunday, 29 January 1939 by Bishop Liston and in the presence of Hon. H. G. R. Mason, (Attorney-General and local member of parliament – for the Auckland Suburbs electorate), the Mayor of Auckland, Sir Ernest Davis, and Mr Justice Callan of the Supreme Court (who had been a pupil of the Christian Brothers in Dunedin and had also been a classmate of Liston's). Br Keniry represented the Provincial of the Christian Brothers, Brother Hanrahan, at the opening. The opening took place on a wet afternoon and, as he read his speech, Bishop Liston was sheltered under an umbrella held by the foundation headmaster of the college, Brother F.P. O'Driscoll. In spite of the rain, many friends and well-wishers participated in the opening.

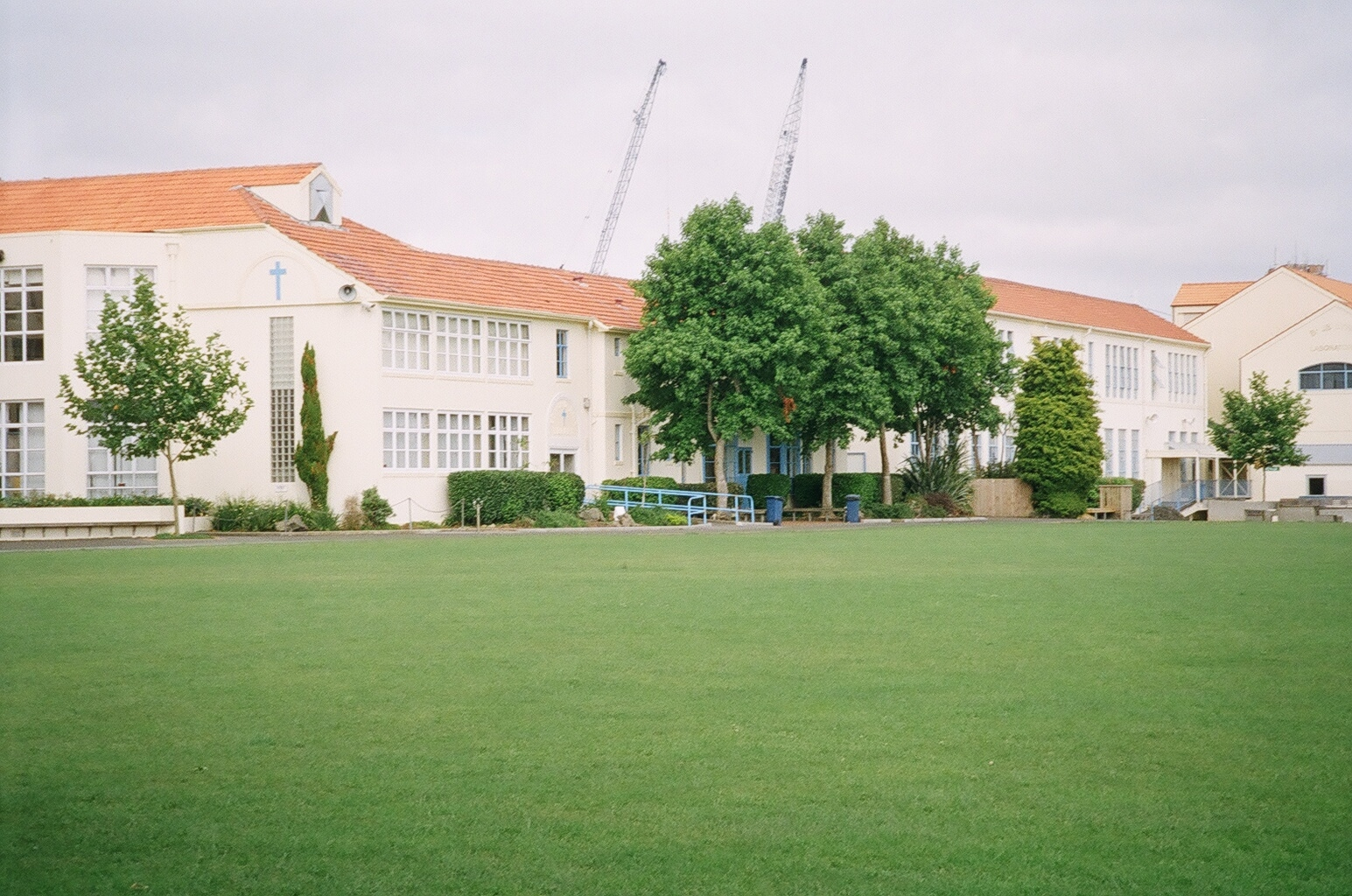
St Peter's College, Auckland – original buildings built 1939–1944 (Christian Brothers' House behind trees), in 2009.

After referring to the bequest of the Outhwaite family and making placatory remarks about the Marist Brothers, Liston welcomed the Christian Brothers. He said that they were "here at the invitation of the Bishop to take charge of St Peter's school and to have their part, along with the Marist Brothers and other religious communities, in our Catholic education system. They have their own traditions to give us, formed in the society's work of teaching since 1802, and the fruit of the experience gathered, to speak only of Australia and New Zealand, of over 500 Brothers teaching more than 20,000 boys". Liston added, " ... if I know the Brothers at all, the boys under their care will be put to hard work – an excellent thing – and teachers will not do for them what they should do for themselves. The thought of the years ahead and of the eternal life will be regarded as of first importance. Teachers will feel it their daily duty to fit the boys to bear life's burdens with a spirit of nobility and to meet life's problems with unfaltering courage". At the conclusion of his speech, Bishop Liston said, "This is a very happy day for me indeed for I owe much more than I can say to the training I received at the hands of the Christian Brothers in Dunedin long years ago."

The original school buildings opened in 1939 on the 4-acre (1.6 ha) Outhwaite site consisted of an incomplete two-storied class-block (now the Bro P. O'Driscoll Building) and an incomplete two-storied residence (the brother's residence). They were designed by William Henry Gummer (1884–1966), a student of Sir Edwin Lutyens and architect of some notable Auckland buildings such as the Dilworth Building in Queen Street and the old Auckland railway station in Beach Road. He also designed the National War Memorial and carillon and National Art Gallery and Dominion Museum buildings in Wellington. The two original school buildings were fully completed in 1944. In 1955 a statue of the Blessed Virgin Mary, paid for by the Christian Brothers Old Boys, was placed in the alcove on the Bro P O'Driscoll Building above the quadrangle.

=== 1939 – Commencement challenges ===
On Monday, 6 February 1939, St Peter's College opened its doors with a roll of 183 pupils, aged from 11 to 14 (i.e. from Form I to Form IV). Five brothers comprised the original staff: Brothers O'Driscoll, ^{[note g]} Killian, Rapp, Skehan and Carroll.^{[note h]} Brother Skehan had been at St. Kevin's College, Oamaru and the others had been in Sydney.

The average size of the four classes in the first year of the college was thirty boys. But Form IV commenced with fourteen pupils. These had come from ten different schools. There had been no unity in the textbooks used in these schools, but also the boys had studied different subjects. By the end of the first term it was evident to the Brothers that there was quite a teaching problem and it was decided to start the second term of Form IV with Theorem One in Geometry and Lesson One in French, Latin, Algebra, etc. – all the start of Form III work. The object was to get through two complete years' work (Form III and Form IV – Years 9 and 10) in two terms (i.e. the second and third terms – from May to December). Many of the fourteen pupils transferred down to Form III. For the senior class, play or recreation time was cut in half.

School was conducted on Saturday mornings, when the week's theoretical study of Chemistry was tested by practical experiments. "No text books were allowed on Saturdays, and woe betide any student who didn't know the properties and tests for various gases and metals and their respective weights". Brother O'Driscoll, a large man, vigorously thumped or pounded the blackboard to drive home important points. Several new blackboards had to be acquired. By the third term only four students were left – Bill Aitkin, Max Denize, Des and John Rosser. The following year (1940) Brother O'Driscoll allowed three to sit for Matriculation (University Entrance) and one for the Public Service Examination. All four passed. The first Dux of the college was Des Rosser in 1940. His twin brother John was dux in 1941. The brothers subsequently donated the Rosser Cup, presented each year for Dux of St Peter's College.

=== Great walls and new buildings ===
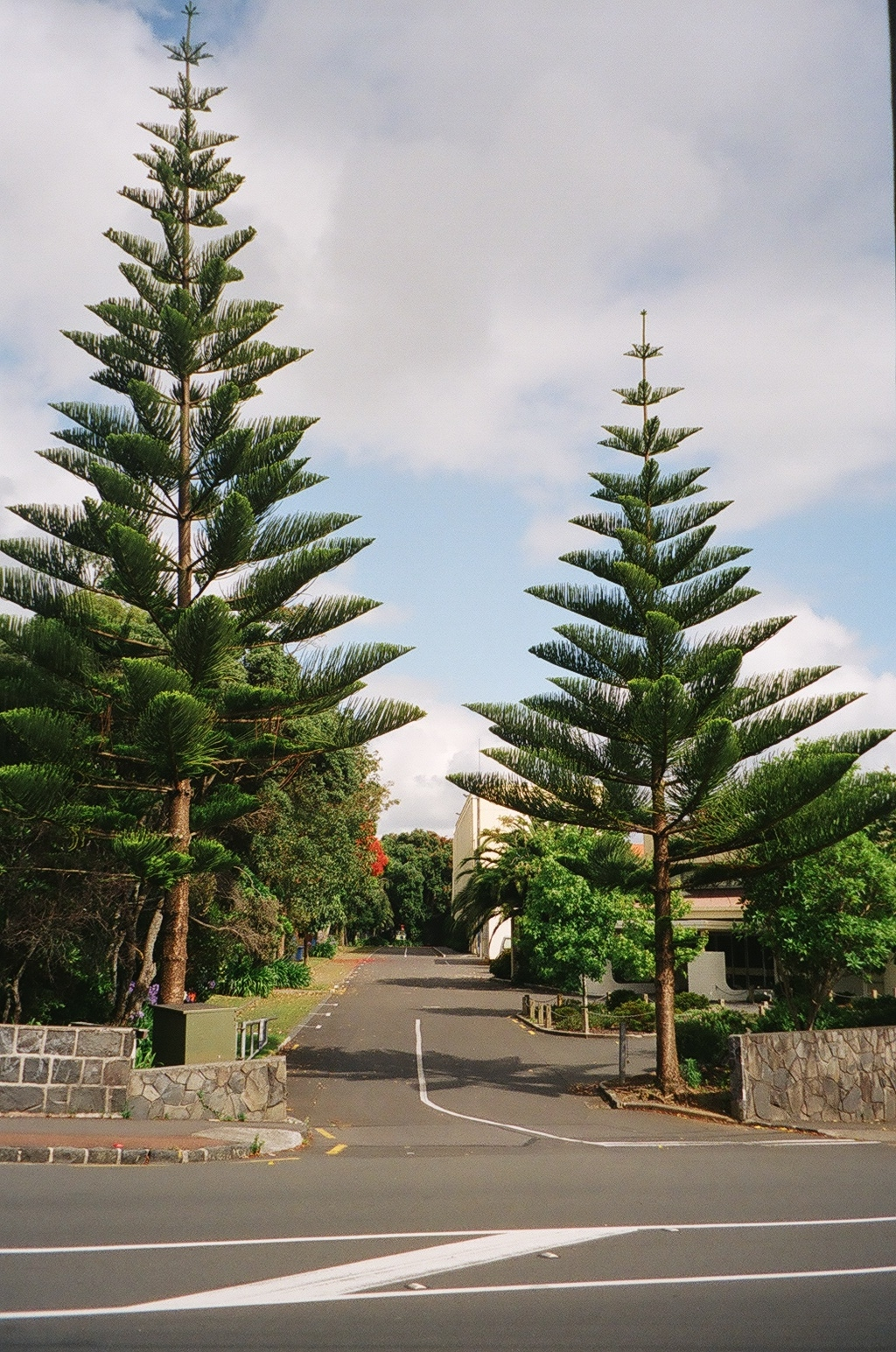
St Peter's College Entrance (former site of Reeves Rd), 2009

The transformation of the grounds, the development of Reeves Road, the planting of lawns, garden plots and the erection of the front stone wall along Reeves Road continued over the next few years. The trees planted were mostly Syzygium smithii (an Australian species – also known as Monkey Apple), along Reeves Rd, and, indigenous trees near the tennis courts, including Pūriri trees and the Pōhutukawa tree which, in 2024, still survived as the "Sam Hunt Tree". "At the same time, tons of soil and rock were brought up from the site of the [netball] courts (now the site of the St Peter's College Sports Complex) to make the playing field. But the masterpiece of all the constructional work was the huge stone retaining wall below the tennis courts [(and above the netball courts)]. The first pupils daily eagerly visited it as if it were some modern Great Wall of China, and watched in wonder as it took shape".

After the end of the Second World War, significant developments were: the opening of the college chapel in 1953 (see below); the building of the first prefabricated classroom block; and the conversion of the old bungalow used as a shelter shed and of a classroom to a library in the 1950s.^{[note i]}

In 1961, St Peter's had the largest roll of any Catholic school in New Zealand, having 834 pupils. More building projects became necessary.

In the 1960s, the Brothers' residence was extended and a new science block consisting of science laboratories, classrooms and a demonstration room was built. This building was upgraded in the 1990s and is now called the Brother J. B. Lynch Science Laboratories. A large three-story set of classrooms (now called the Brother B E Ryan Building) plus assembly hall and squash courts were opened in the early 1970s.

=== The Cage and the motorway ===
In 1959, Archbishop^{[note j]} Liston purchased 2.5 acres (1 ha) on Mountain Road opposite the school. This land was owned by New Zealand Breweries and had been part of the Great Northern Brewery, later called Lion Brewery, which stretched from Khyber Pass along Mountain Rd up as far as Seccombes Rd. Part of the land purchased had been used as tennis courts for the staff. The land became available because, from 1950, New Zealand Breweries was concentrating its beer production at the Captain Cook Brewery further down Khyber Pass towards Newmarket (later the site of the University of Auckland Newmarket Campus). The Lion Brewery site was therefore sold off, part to the New Zealand Distillary Company and part, which included the tennis courts, to the Bishop of Auckland for St Peter's College. The site was purchased from New Zealand Breweries for £11,000 per acre, a concessional price. The sum was paid by the parents of the school through fairs, raffles and money contributions. Students were involved in picking up stones and glass from the field, sometimes as a detention. The site was used as a rugby field (at first called "the Far Field" or "the New Field" and now, "the Cage"). Located on it is a sports' pavilion called the Brother P. C. Ryan Sports Pavilion. It is named for Brother "Paddy" Ryan, the headmaster at the time, who managed the purchase and transformation of the site. The pavilion replaced an earlier pavilion opened in 1960 (see below). In 2012 the Cage was refurbished into an Astro turf field suitable for playing rugby and football in all weathers and conditions.

Henry Cooper, the headmaster of nearby Auckland Grammar School, was also interested in this land for his school but the price New Zealand Breweries required for it (£30,000) was considered too high. Cooper was "particularly annoyed" that he failed to obtain the site as St Peter's got it for somewhat less than the price quoted to Grammar and which had been considered prohibitive by the Ministry of Works (which would have had to purchase the land for Grammar, a State school). However, Cooper attended the official opening of the resulting new St Peter's College pavilion and field on 19 November 1960 and he " ... offered the congratulations of the other schools of Auckland and expressed great pleasure that his friendly neighbours had obtained such a handsome new playing field".

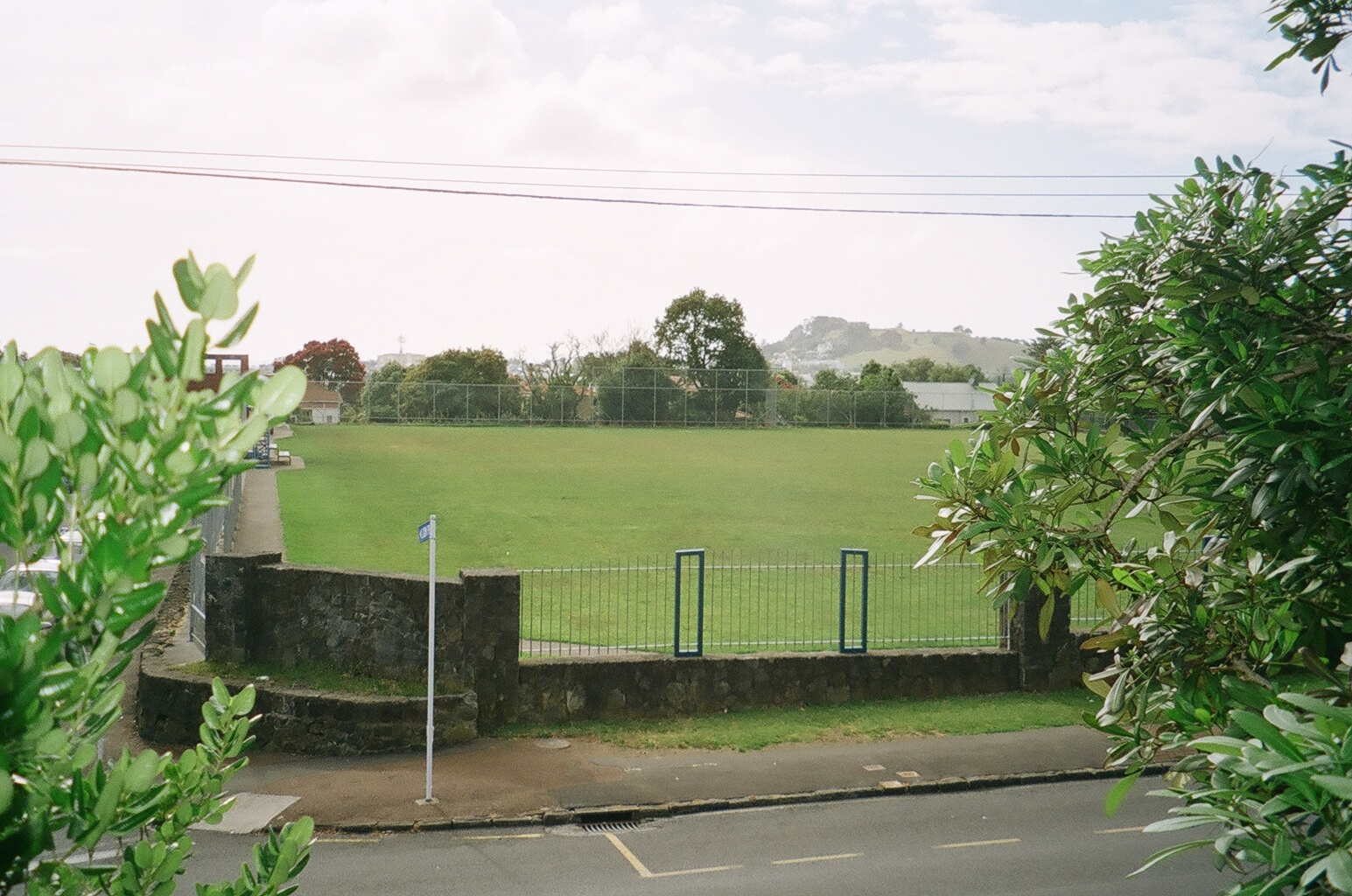
St Peter's College-The Cage Rugby field (former brewery land), 2009.

Cooper used the episode in his argument for the transfer of the Mt Eden Prison quarries to Auckland Grammar for the creation of new sports fields for that school. He pointed out that the brewery site would have been very suitable for Grammar and that Grammar had been beaten to it by a "private school". The context of this was that the new Auckland Southern Motorway development was projected to take the main Grammar rugby field which lay between the two schools. Although St Peter's was to be less affected, Liston supported Auckland Grammar in its opposition to the motorway and the projected route. Auckland Grammar argued that the motorway was going to adversely affect "two great schools" and should either be abandoned or re-routed. However, one of Grammar's suggested alternative routes was to be "further down" Mountain Road, which would have taken the motorway either through St Peter's College or through the Catholic netball courts which were used by the college and are now part of it as the site of the sports complex. Either of these proposed alternative routes would also have taken out the newly acquired and developed rugby field.

Grammar lost its rugby field in 1964, but was compensated by the Mt Eden Prison quarries. St Peter's lost a small section of land on its south west extremity for the motorway on-ramp at Khyber Pass Rd and in return was sold Reeves Road and some prison houses at a concessional price. Reeves Rd disappeared as a street and much of the subsequent expansion of the school has taken place on its site. However, both Auckland Grammar and St Peter's have had to endure the adjacent motorway since 1965.

=== The railway station ===
For nearly fifty years St Peter's College had its own railway station, developed on the initiative of Brother T. A. Monagle in 1964, to cater for the large number of students from St Peter's College and Auckland Grammar School who arrived on the North or West train and had to alight at Mt Eden Station and walk to their schools.

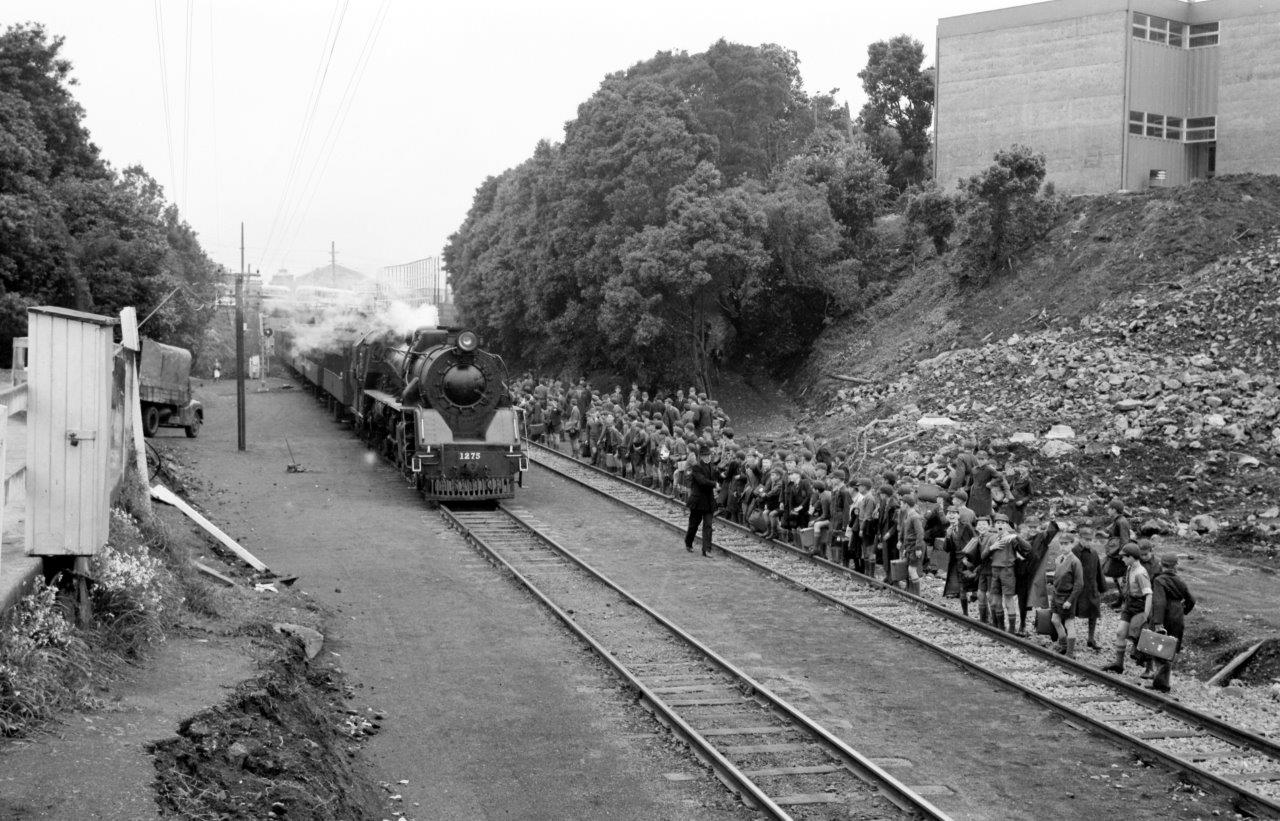
The school train at St Peter's College railway station 13 April 1964

They had to cross busy roads and undertake an uncontrolled crossing of the railway line itself, to walk the ten minutes, under the walls of Mt Eden Prison, to their schools. Meanwhile the train had continued on its way following the same path to the north-west boundary of St Peter's. The railway station, at first just a metalled strip parallel to the tracks, was first known as the St Peter's College station and only the "school trains" stopped there. Later, the station became a full stop with all passenger trains stopping and was known as the Boston Rd Station.

Up to a third of the school's enrolment (i.e. 400 students) commuted to the college by train and used the Grafton station (which replaced the Boston Rd Station). The presence of St Peter's boys was a marked feature of suburban train travel in Auckland. Even when the Onehunga suburban line reopened in 2010, there were St Peter's boys on the first trains.

Until 13 September 2026 (the opening of the Auckland City Rail Link), all trains from western areas of Auckland travelled directly through to Grafton station. From 13 September 2026, to reach Grafton station, St Peter's boys from the west had to change trains from the East West line to the South City Line at Karanga-a-Hape station. Sometimes they could travel directly to Grafton on the Onehunga West Line or by changing trains to that line at Maungawhau station.

From 13 September 2026, for the first time ever, St Peter's boys from the east and south had direct rail access to Grafton station and St Peter's College by means of the South City Line and the Onehunga West Line.

=== James Liston ===
Bishop James Liston (later Archbishop) presided at all the school prize-giving ceremonies from the first until his retirement in 1970.

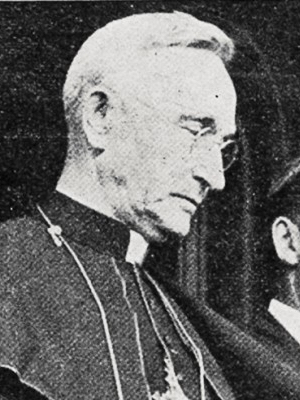
Bishop James Liston

At the 1970 ceremony Brother B E Ryan, the headmaster of the college, said, in the final presence of Liston, that St Peter's College might not have been created without Liston's decision, for which he was criticised (see above).

Liston often expressed gratitude publicly to the Christian Brothers' School in Dunedin where he had been a pupil on occasions involving Christian Brothers institutions. However, Liston's gratitude did have its limits. There is a well-known story at St Peter's College concerning the large Christian Brothers emblem above the main northern entrance to the original school building. In the course of the creation of that emblem in 1938 or 1939, Bishop Liston arrived to survey progress on the building of the school. He ordered work to stop on the emblem because the school was "his" and did not belong to the Christian Brothers; the emblem was completed in 2014. The college was "his" in the sense that it was (and is) owned directly by the Bishop of Auckland. Liston did often acknowledge his debt to the Christian Brothers for establishing and maintaining St Peter's College.

In January 1943 Liston wrote to his old classmate Br Michael James Benignus Hanrahan, the Provincial of the Christian Brothers when the college was established, on the occasion of the latter's Golden Jubilee, saying that the school had always been what Hanrahan or himself would wish it to be.

When Liston died in 1976 the college formed a guard of honour for his funeral cortege from the Town Hall to Grafton Bridge. When the school adopted a new motto (it had been in Latin: Facere et Docere, translated as "To Do and to Teach"), it adopted the English version of Liston's personal motto in Latin: Amare et Servire, translated as "To Love and to Serve".

=== Christian Brothers ===
The Christian Brothers provided staff for St Peter's College from its opening in 1939 until 2007. However, the numbers of brothers teaching at St Peter's College gradually declined from the 1970s. In 1975 there were 15 brothers teaching. In 1982 this number had reduced to eight. In 1988 it was 7, 4 in 1991, 2 in 1993, and 1 from 1994. From 1994 until July 2007, Bro. Paul Robertson was the only Christian Brother teaching full time at St Peter's College. He was the associate principal of the college. Brother Robertson occasionally returned to provide support to special character groups. Other brothers came from time to time to provide professional development to staff.

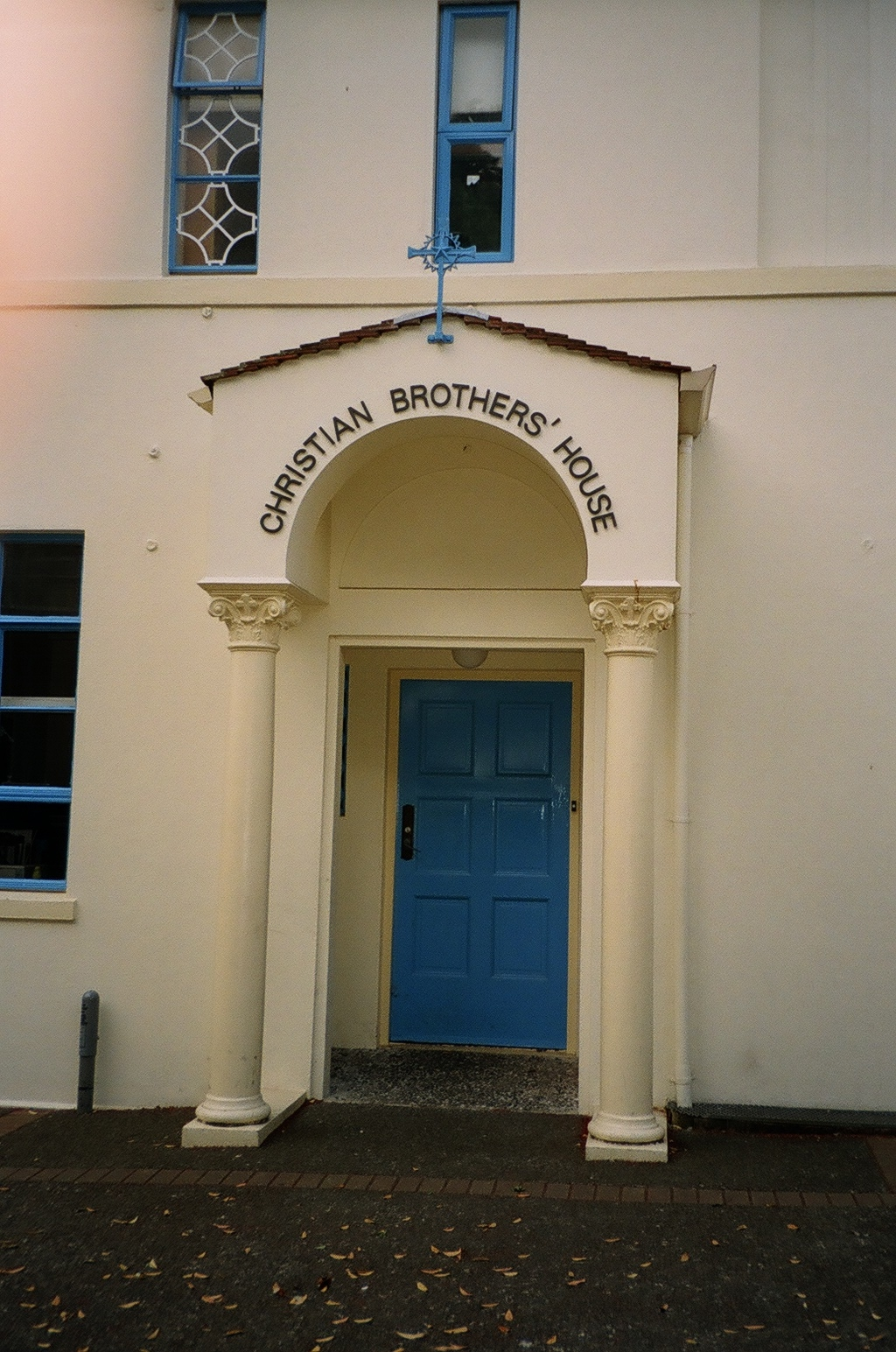
St Peter's College, Christian Brothers' House entrance (1939), in 2009

The integration of St Peter's College into the state education system also " ... caused a 'church/state' separation of the [Christian Brothers] community from the institution". This was demonstrated particularly in the formal splitting of authority in the school between the school board of trustees and the headmaster of the college, and the new role of the former in staffing matters.

As the Christian Brothers did not own the school, they could not appoint their representatives on the board. The proprietor's representatives where instead appointed by the school's owner, the Bishop of Auckland. In 1992 the Christian Brothers shifted from the college to a new community house in Queen Mary Avenue, Epsom, acquired because it was near St Peter's College.

Brother L. H. Wilkes wrote about what this meant for the Christian Brothers community. "For years the dread of leaving St Peter's house hung over the community at St Peter's. In 1991 it was down to months and in early 1992 it was down to weeks and to days. Nobody actually spoke definitely about leaving but everyone knew it was inevitable. I could just not imagine the community in an ordinary house in an ordinary street ...".

Some Brothers teaching at St Peter's College in the late 1980s moved to another community house in Mangere which soon closed. Apart from Brother Paul Robertson, the last serving Christian Brother to retain regular involvement with St Peter's College was Brother V. N. Cusack. He worked in the St Peter's tuckshop until 1997, arriving at 7.30am every school day to heat the pies. Mr Peter Watt ("Watty"), who was an old boy of St Peter's, and a Christian Brother from 1966 to 1981, taught at the college as a Brother from 1969 to 1972 and in 1980. He ceased to be a Christian Brother in 1981. He returned to St Peter's to teach Mathematics and coach cricket from 1986, retiring in 2016. He remained closely associated with the college until his death on 20 June 2018, in the college's 80th year.

Monsignor Paul Farmer (a pupil 1960–1965), the chaplain of the college at various times from the 1970s, and, as of 2021, the current chaplain, had a family connection with St Peter's going back to its opening in 1939, when his father was a first day pupil. Farmer stated that, in praising the work of the Christian Brothers at St Peter's:

The Brothers, I think, created an extraordinary spirit - they laid the foundation for the school. They were good men, practical men, and very generous men with their talents and their lives. There were only ever, in my early days here, one or two lay teachers as they were called then, and [the brothers] might have got only one free period a week. They had no car - I remember when I was here, the old boys and the PTA had a big fundraiser to buy the brothers a car. We can't imagine that today. They ran the place on the smell of an oily rag - remember, 1939 was the year World War II started. They were difficult times, and these guys put their hearts and soul into the place. Everything was done by them - a broken window was fixed, the lawns were mowed, everything.

— Monsignor Paul Farmer, 2021.

=== Present day ===
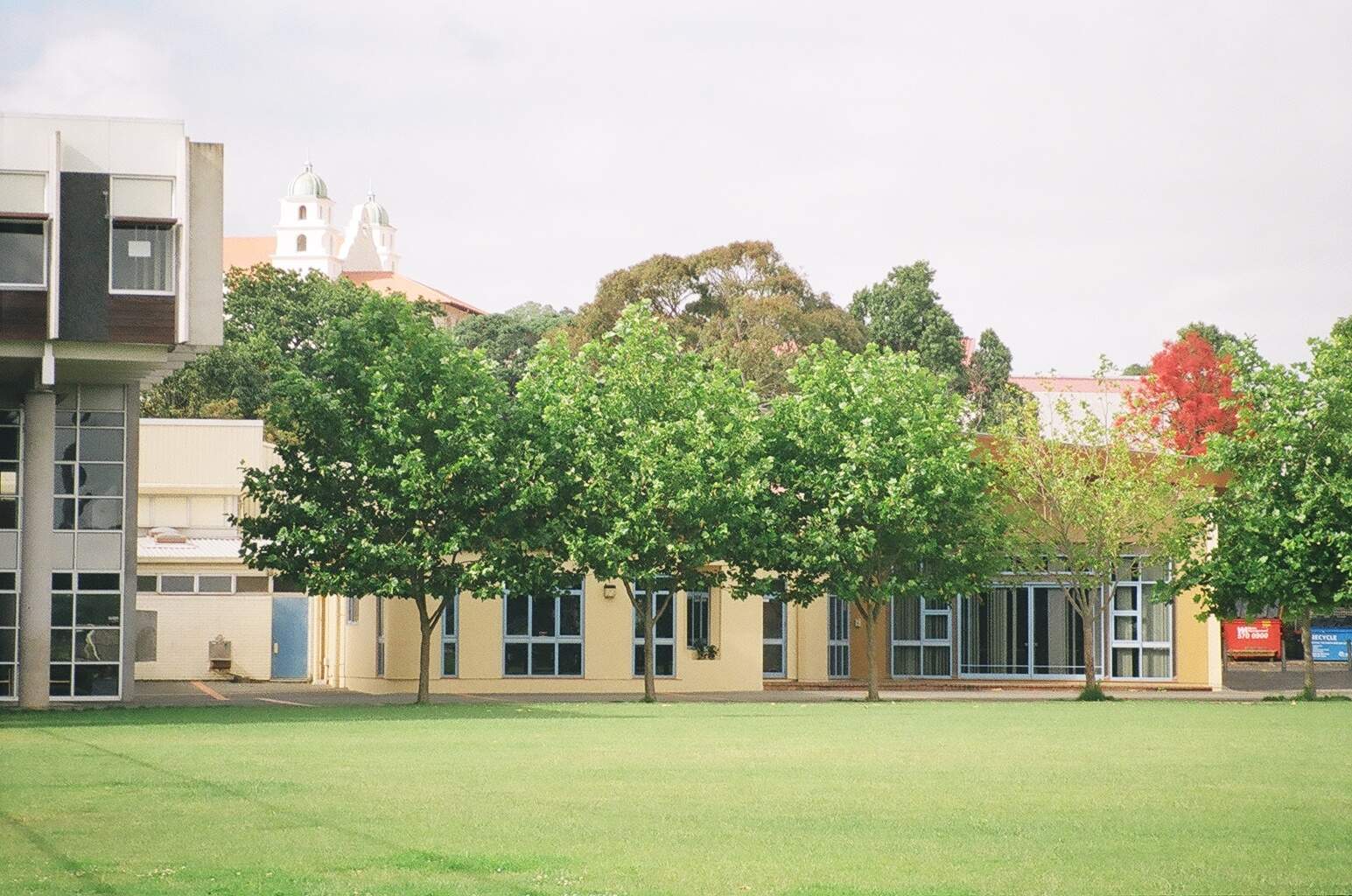
St Peter's College in 2009 – Middle School & Bro Smith Music and Drama Suite, known colloquially as 'M Block'

The appointment of Kieran Fouhy in 1989 marked the end of 50 years of leadership by Christian Brother headmasters. After integration and under lay leadership, the school roll increased significantly from 669 in 1989 to 1,344 students in 2015, and has remained around that level since. During the 1990s, as well as the renovation (and naming) of the Brother J. B. Lynch Science Laboratories, the Brother P. C Ryan sports pavilion replaced the original pavilion built in 1960 and which had been ruined by fire. The Brother W. R. Smith Music and Drama Suite was built. Brother Smith (1948–1953), the third headmaster of the college, had initiated the first school orchestra. The Brother L. H. Wilkes Technology Block was opened in 2001 (awarded the NZIA Resene Supreme Award for Architecture 2002 and the NZIA Resene Branch Award for Architecture 2001) and a dedicated building for the intermediate school ("the Middle School") on Mountain Road, named after Brother V.A. Sullivan, was occupied in 2003. The St Peter's College Sports Complex was erected on the old netball courts was opened on 21 September 2010 by the Governor-General of New Zealand, Sir Anand Satyanand, and was a 2012 Auckland Architecture Award winner. In 2015 a 12-classroom block was completed on Mountain Road and named the "Outhwaite Building," in honour of Isa Outhwaite, the donor of the school site. The Outhwaite building was carefully located by the middle school to protect the “Sam Hunt” Pōhutukawa tree (Hunt recited poems from it whilst a student at St Peter's).

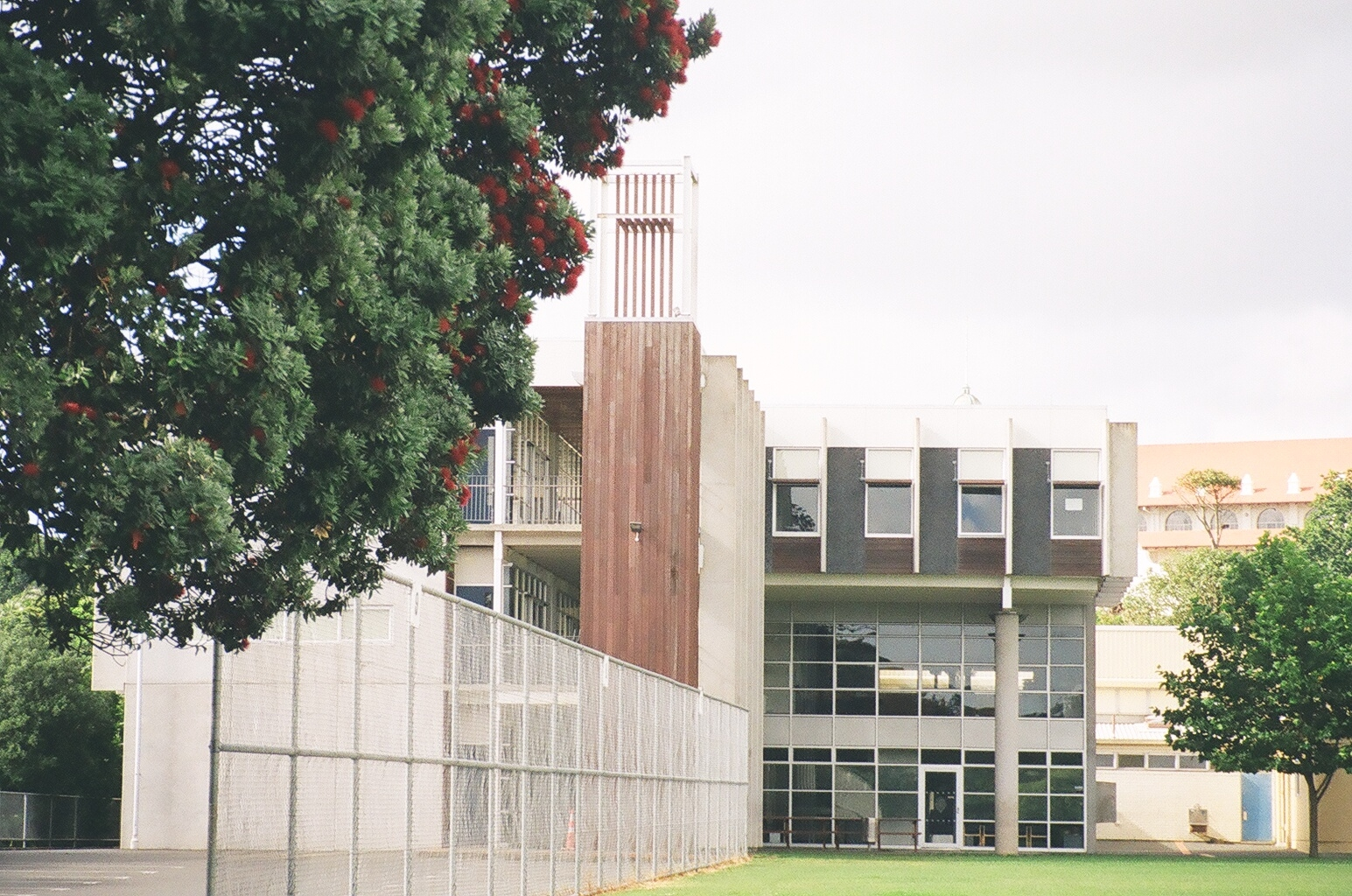
St Peter's College Middle School in 2009 (Years 7 and 8), known colloquially as ‘S Block’

St Peter's has continued to follow the objectives of the Christian Brothers' founder, 18th-century Irish merchant Blessed Edmund Rice, to encourage its members to serve the community in ways such as participation in Edmund Rice Camps and committing themselves to Rice's objective of bringing social justice. All St Peter's students are required to complete service work ("any unpaid work that is not for relatives") as part of their life at the College.

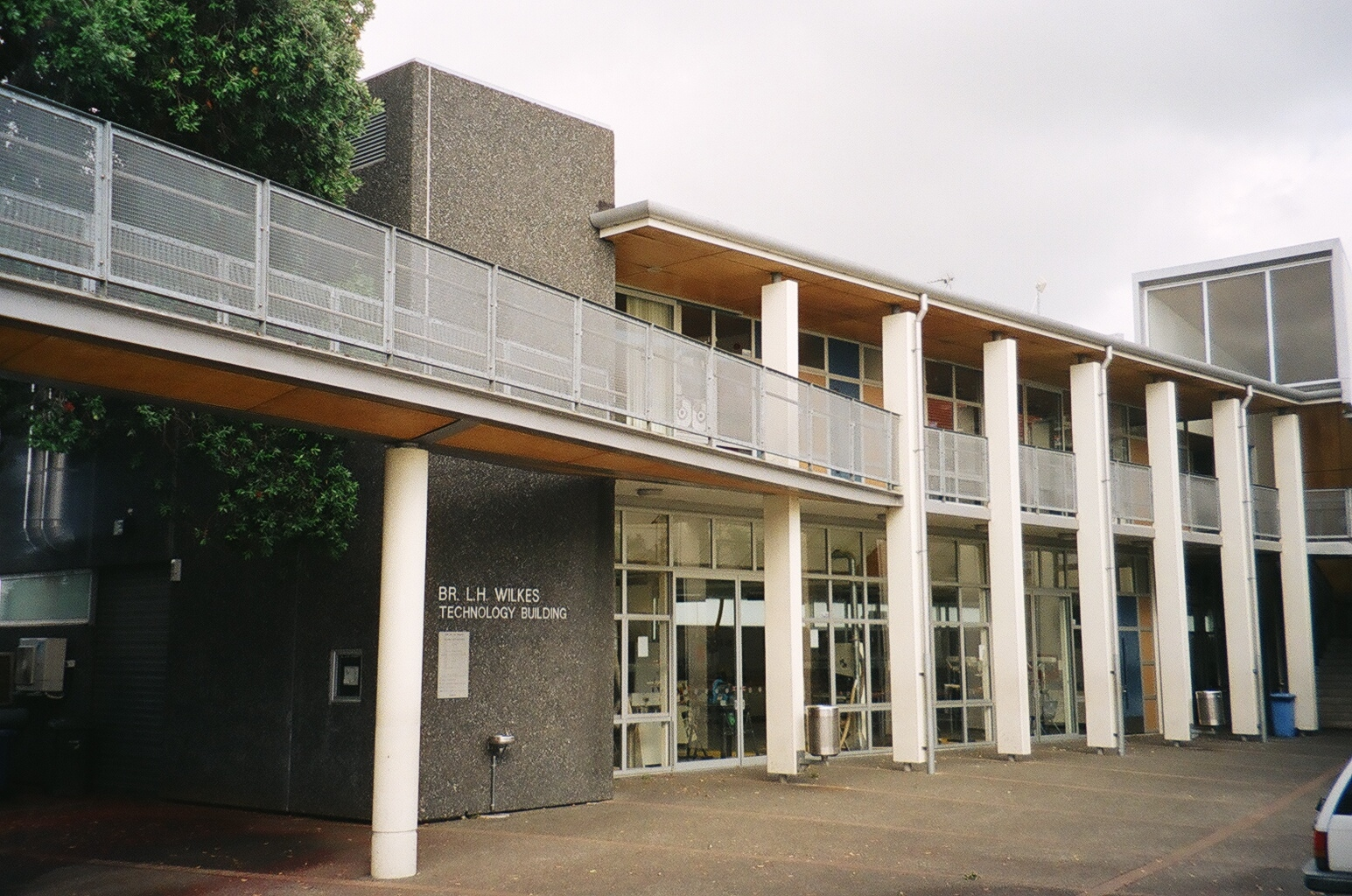
St Peter's College in 2009, Brother Wilkes Technology Building, known colloquially as 'T Block'

Christian Brothers missions in Polynesia were supported, particularly Nukutere College in Rarotonga and regular trips to India were organised for senior students. In supporting students' sporting aspirations, football and softball academies were established along with the explosion of basketball in the college, with 260 boys currently playing.

The school maintains academic standards and has received awards in music and achievements in sports. The school has a multicultural student body and cultural activities, including awards at events such as the ASB Polyfest.

The school was led by its first non-Christian Brother headmaster, Kieran Fouhy, for 27 years from 1989 until 2015. He was awarded the Member of the New Zealand Order of Merit (MNZM) for services to education in the 2016 Queen's Birthday Honours.

The second non-Christian Brother, and tenth, headmaster of the college, James Bentley, was appointed in 2016. Under his tenure the new chapel was completed and a structure called "Watty's Nets" was opened for cricket bowling practice. Other building projects were launched including the revamping of the Brother J B Lynch Science Laboratories reopened by alumnus ('47), Dr Ron Trubuhovich in 2024.

== Overview ==
=== Roll and academics ===
St Peter's College provides intermediate and secondary education, within the roll limit set by the Minister of Education, to Catholic boys from throughout the city. It does not have an enrolment scheme, commonly known as “zoning”, limiting enrolments by location of student residence. However, as it usually has several applicants for every place, the school is highly selective. The school prioritises Catholic boys but there are no feeder primary schools where boys are guaranteed a place. "[Boys] from 55 different primary schools were accepted into [the St Peter's] Year 7 intake for 2024." Then the choice is based on other factors such as "good at rugby, good at music, academic prowess — and supportive home environments."

The ethnic composition of students as of November 2025 was: European/Pākehā 43%; Māori 12.6%; Polynesian 17.7% (including Samoan and Tongan); Asian 23.9% (including Chinese, Korean, Indian and Filipino) and others 2.9%. As of 2025, there were approximately 126 paid staff (teaching, support, and grounds staff).

The school offers both the National Certificate of Educational Achievement assessment system (NCEA), and the Cambridge International Examinations (CIE) for Year 11-13. Academic performance among senior students at St Peter's is traditionally strong, whether they take NCEA, NZQA Scholarship, or CIE. The academic achievements of senior students are honoured at the start of every year at the annual 'Scholars' Assembly'.

In 2024, 91.0% of St Peter's College leavers who finished their courses left having qualified with University Entrance (UE). The national average for all secondary schools was 48% and the average for schools with "Few Social Economic Barriers (FSB)" was 69%. Most St Peter's College leavers (including Māori and Pasifika leavers) go on to tertiary study at university. In 2025 the school achieved an overall pass rate of 99% in NCEA Level 3, and 99% of all CIE A-level students achieved UE. The school also received a record number of NZQA Scholarships in 2025, with 91, including thirteen Outstanding Scholarships.

=== Zeitgeist ===
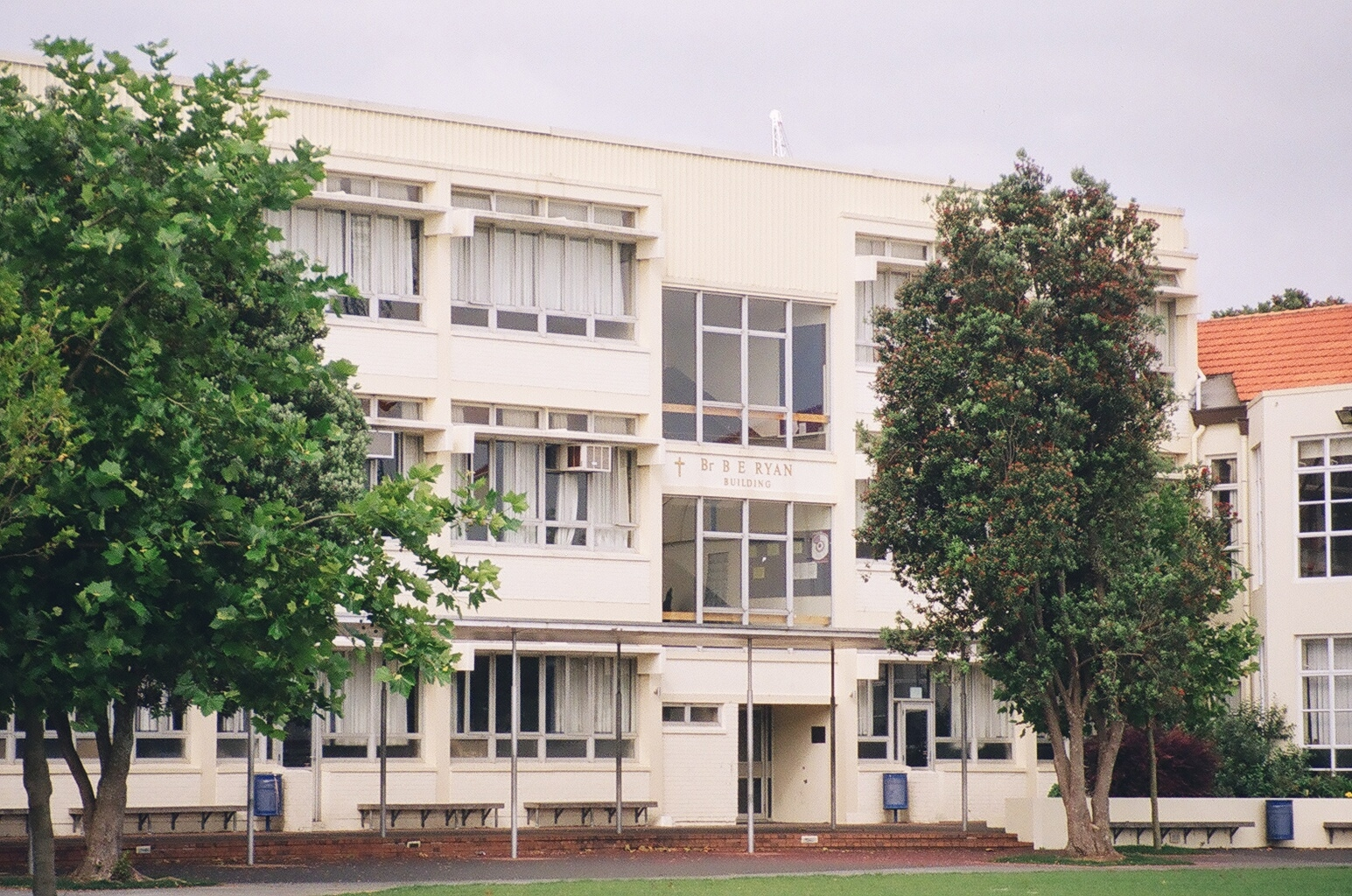
Bro. B. E. Ryan building (built 1973) (2009)

As a state-integrated Catholic school, St Peter's takes seriously the meaning of its special character (which is set out in the integration agreement of the college). A number of groups exist to enhance the development of each student's faith journey, including the Special Character group. Retreats for Year 7, 8, 10, and 11 students are held. Year 12 and 13 students are invited to apply for the Kairos retreat, a four-day retreat held biannually at the St Francis Retreat Centre in Hillsborough, Auckland. Prefects and certain Year 12 students join with students from sister school St Mary's College to lead Quest, which is a special retreat for Year 9 students.

The school is also conscious of its Edmund Rice heritage, operating an Edmund Rice group open to all students which aims to foster renewed awareness of both Edmund Rice and the Christian Brothers. In his Annual principal's report for 1988, Brother Prendergast described the characteristics of a Christian Brothers school as: the encouragement given to pupils to strive for scholastic excellence; a religious dimension; the cultivation of a strong devotion to the Virgin Mary; the emphasis given to the care and concern for each individual in the school community; and a particular concern for the poor.

Prendergast also said that Christian Brothers' schools throughout the world had a remarkable similarity of purpose, spirit and tone.

Allowing for culture change, a boy from St Peter's College in Auckland will fit in easily in Cardinal Newman College, Buenos Aires or Waverley College, Sydney, or St Columba's School, New Delhi, or St Edward's College, Liverpool, or in schools in twenty other countries.

Other Edmund Rice schools in New Zealand are: Liston College, Auckland; Trinity Catholic College, Dunedin; St Kevin's College, Oamaru; and St Thomas of Canterbury College, Christchurch. The five schools participate in an annual Edmund Rice Leadership Programme at the beginning of the school year. In 2026, St Peter's hosted the programme for the first time at the St Francis Retreat Centre, with fellow Edmund Rice schools Liston College and St Thomas of Canterbury College. Monsignor Paul Farmer, Old Boy from 1960 to 1965, and school chaplain in the 1970s and from 2021 onwards, stated that when he was a boy and during the 1970s, there was a much greater degree of uniformity. But apart from the changes in popular culture (like the Beatles hair styles in the early 1960s which the Brothers tried unsuccessfully to fight), in 2021, the boys were much easier to manage and were treated with much greater respect.

It didn't matter who you were or where you came from, whether you were intelligent or dumb, one shirt fitted everybody. It was very much a macho male culture. It was a shouting and noisy culture ... I think there is much more respect for the individual boy, for the differences in character, for the different places in which people learn. And the staff, I think, are much more respectful overall of the students than they were previously. I think that is why the students are so much more able to be managed and to be respectful. It is a much more respectful place. I think it is just the changes that have taken place in society that have brought this about.

Students are taught the six values of faith, respect, excellence, service, heart, and presence (FRESHP) as part of developing into a 'St Peter's Man', and this ethos permeates school life. St Peter's students from Year 7 to Year 12 must complete service work, gradually increasing in hours required ("any unpaid work that is not for relatives") as part of their life at the College. Year 13 students are not allocated a set amount of hours of service to complete, but are expected to work with a chosen portfolio. A mid-day reflection is held every day, signified by a short ringing of the school bell, inspired by the Christian Brothers' old practice of praying the Ignatian examen.

=== Music and cultural activities ===
St. Peter's places great emphasis on music education and all Year 7 and 8 students receive musical tuition and learn to play a musical instrument. There are several instrumental groups for junior (Years 7-10) and senior students (Years 11-13). St. Peter's has multiple groups with sister school Baradene College of the Sacred Heart including a senior Symphony Orchestra and Junior Jazz Band. The school continues a strong choral tradition, with both a senior and junior choir.

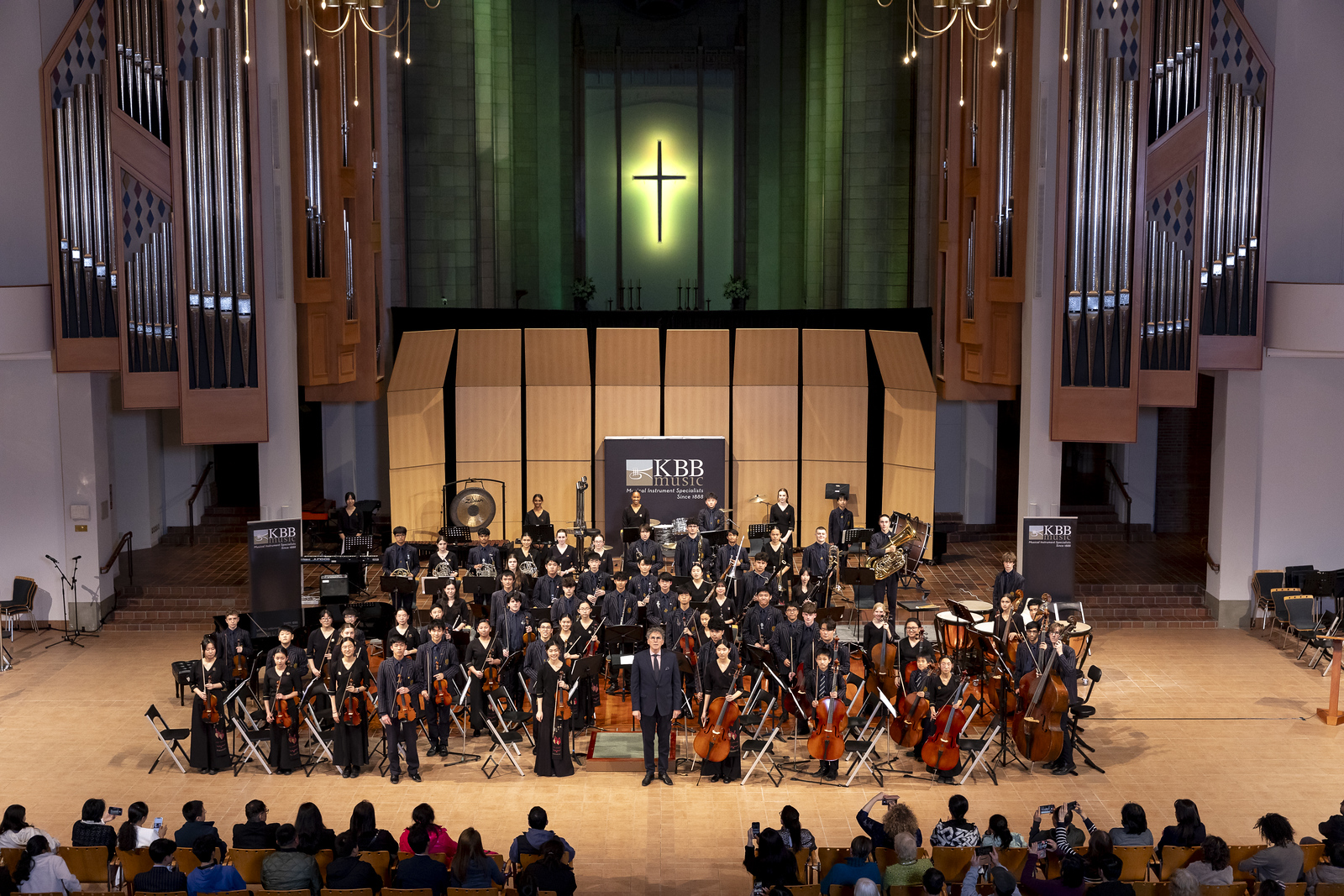
St Peter's and Baradene College performing at the KBB Music Festival (2024)

The culturally diverse roll has contributed to the school being successful in the Pacific Islands cultural schools competition, ASB Polyfest, especially in the Samoan section which St Peter's first won in 2007. The college repeated that in 2008, 2009, 2010 and 2011. St. Peter's finished second two consecutive seasons (2012 and 2013) and won in 2014, 2015 and 2021. Success has also come with the Tongan group Kailao in 2021. In 2020, for the first time in the history of the college, the Kapa haka group qualified for Division One at ASB Polyfest..

=== Performing arts ===
St Peter's has a long tradition of staging musical productions at various venues with other schools such as Baradene College and St Mary's College. Since the 2000s it has been staged annually, with performances of famous productions like Jesus Christ Superstar and Miss Saigon. Until 2020 they were staged at neighbouring Auckland Grammar School's Centennial Theatre. In 2021, the school chose to partner with sister school Marist College to stage the annual production at the Playhouse Theatre in Glen Eden, where it has been held in since. The two colleges staged The Addams Family in 2026.

=== Sport ===
St Peter's has a well established sporting tradition. The current Director of Sport, Annie Sadlier, has stated that students at the school are expected to participate in at least two sports every year.

In 1939 the college affiliated to the secondary schools' rugby union. In 1941 the college won the seventh grade rugby competition. On 21 March 1941 the first annual College swimming championships meeting was held at the Olympic pool, Newmarket. Softball also started early at St Peter's and it was recorded that College students were playing in the softball competitions in 1945. In 1981, St Peter's College won the inaugural national Secondary School's Softball Championship and other national championships in 1990, 1999, 2000, 2002 and 2003. It also won the Auckland Softball Premiership every year from 1994 until 2008, and several times since then. One sport promoted in the early days of the college was boxing. The school boxing championships were held annually, usually at the Municipal Hall, Newmarket. ^{[note l]}

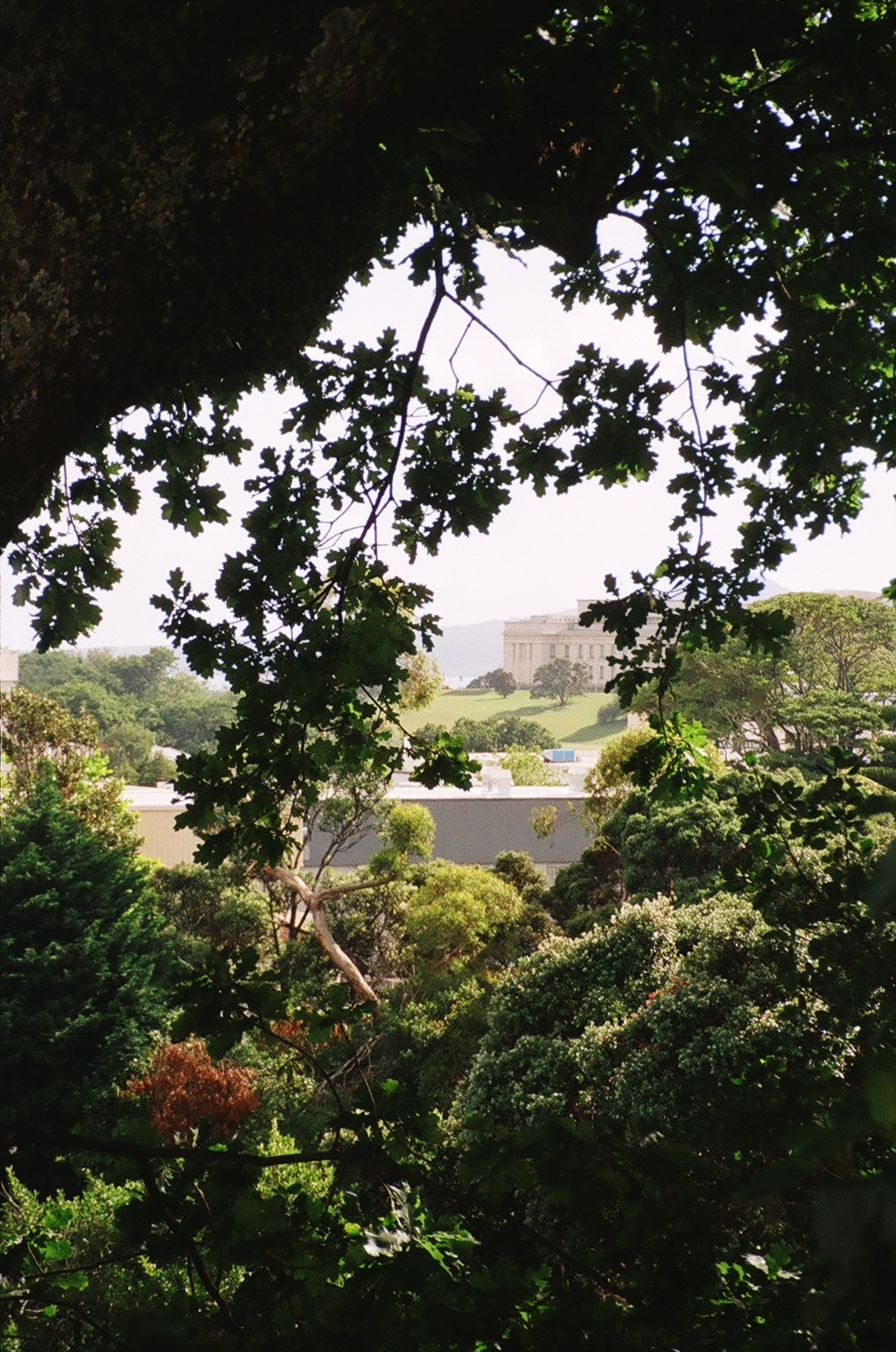
Over the grounds of St Peter's College towards Auckland Museum and the Waitemata harbour (2009)

In the 1950s the athletics chant of the school (adapted by the Christian Brothers from their Australian schools) was urangabe, urangabe, urangabe uranga/Woolagalla, woolagalla, rumba/Flay them, beat them, yah mung do!/Christies, Christies, blue, gold, blue. One old boy, at SPC in the mid-1950s, wrote that the Christian Brothers (being then "Aussies") were not much interested in rugby but were more interested in cricket, "square-bashing"^{[note n]} and athletics. However, Tony Eyre, remembering his time at the school in the late 1960s, noted that there was a strong expectation that boys would play rugby throughout their school years "deemed part of the rite of passage to manhood that increased your chances of acceptance by your teachers and peers". John Tamihere, at St Peter's in the 1970s, remembered the Christian Brothers (by then mostly Kiwi) being very enthusiastic about Rugby. He wrote that if the Christian Brothers wanted a boy for the First XV, the boy didn't have much say in the matter. "They would walk around the school grounds at lunchtime sizing up" likely candidates to see if they might be any good. They picked out one boy because he looked usefully tall. "I'd rather play soccer", the boy protested, " ... but next minute there he was in the lineout, leaping." Under such pressure, Tamihere played for the college First XV (in 1975 and 1976) although he would have preferred to play Rugby league for the Point Chevalier Pirates and later for the Glenora Bears as his brothers did. He said that the college First XV at that time was composed of " ... not bad players", and they were " ... always competitive". "We didn't win a lot, but on the other hand we never really got hammered". "St Peter's used to play St Kentigern's, who were led out onto the field by their pipe band. When we played Anglican King's College there was no doubt this was a Catholic versus "Proddy" battle, though some of our toughest games were against other Catholic schools like St Paul's and Sacred Heart. If you think Māori society was tribal, you should have seen those Catholics".

In 1980, Hugh McGahan, captain of the New Zealand National Rugby League side, "the Kiwis" from 1986 to 1990, also played for the college First XV, under similar pressure to that exerted on John Tamihere. However, McGahan stated that, in spite of the pressure, it "was a pleasure pulling on the school jersey" to represent the college.

Amongst the college's Rugby highlights was winning by the First XV of the New Zealand Secondary School's Top Four Championship and the Auckland Secondary Schools Premiership in 1987. The latter feat was repeated in 1988. The college won the Auckland Championship and the New Zealand First XV Knock out competition undefeated in 2000. Most recently, St Peter's won the Auckland Secondary Schools Premiership and the National First XV Championship final in 2018. The college has gained the Moascar Cup (national school 1st XV rugby honour) three times, in 1977, 2000 and 2018.

There is also strong traditional Rugby rivalry with other schools such as Liston College, De La Salle College, Auckland Grammar School, Kelston Boys' High School, Mt Albert Grammar School and the North Shore schools, Hato Petera College, Rosmini College and Westlake. An annual senior rugby fixture between Auckland Grammar and St Peter's (The Battle of the Bridge) is played for the Henry Cooper-Br. Paddy Ryan Rugby Challenge Cup in memory of headmasters in office in 1962 when St Peter's beat Grammar for the first time.

Although it made a significant contribution to the sport, St Peter's College did not field Rugby league teams. However, many students played football. The 1st XI competes in the Auckland Premier grade, with their best ever placing being second in the Auckland league in 2025. They have placed third at the NZ Football Championships in 2019 and second in 2023.

Basketball is a fast-growing sport at St Peter's, with 298 students having represented the school in the sport in 2025. The 1st V have traditionally struggled to stay for long periods of time in the Auckland Premier grade, but over the past two years have avoided relegation. In 2025, the 1st V placed third in the Premier grade, their highest ever placing.

Sports offered by the school include: archery, athletics, badminton, basketball, cricket, cycling, distance running, European handball, football, golf, hockey, lawn bowls, martial arts, mountain biking, pickleball, rowing (started 1941),^{[note m]} rugby union, snow sports, softball, strongman, squash, swimming, table tennis, tennis, touch football, triathlon, volleyball, waka ama, water polo and wrestling. In 2022, about 1000 St Peter's College students in more than 60 teams participated in winter sports.

== St Peter's College chapels ==
As a Catholic school in the Edmund Rice tradition, St Peter's has had a number of chapels on its grounds, with the current one being the third permanent chapel for the use of students and staff. Mass is celebrated in the chapel every Friday at lunchtime and the Special Character group runs meetings every Tuesday interval there. The chapel is open to students and staff for prayer and guidance before school and during break times.

As the current chapel has limited seating, major liturgical events usually take place in the school hall (for example, Grandparents' Day for Year 7 students), or at nearby parish churches such as St Michael's Church, Remuera, where the school's annual Leavers' Mass takes place, or St Benedict's Church, Newton. Due to its size, St Patrick's Cathedral in the Auckland CBD has been the normal setting for both the school Inaugural Mass and the annual school celebration of St Peter's Day for a number of years.

=== 1939 chapel ===
From its opening in 1939, the Christian Brothers had a small "but handsome" chapel upstairs in the Brothers' House. It was equipped by past pupils of the Christian Brothers, one of whom, Father J Mansfield, who sixty years previously had been a pupil of the Christian Brothers in Dublin, donated the altar. The chapel was furnished in oak. The altar was walnut and primavera wood, backed by a rich blue and gold hanging.

=== 1953 chapel ===
On 14 November 1953 a larger chapel was blessed and opened by Archbishop Liston. This was built mainly on the initiative of the chaplain of the school, Father Reginald Delargey. Funds were raised by the Old Boys, Men's and Ladies' Committees and the pupils. The chapel cost £3,300. £3,000 was raised by an appeal (£1,400 from parents, friends and Old Boys, and £750 from the pupils including £200 as a result of "self-denial" days). "The opening of the chapel was all the more satisfying because of the involvement of the pupils."

This chapel was located between the Brothers' House and the main school building (now called the "Br O'Driscoll Building"). The chapel was rectangular. It had two aisles between which there were approximately ten pews which could accommodate a class or two for Mass or Benediction. On the other side of each aisle were the Brothers' chairs and prie-dieux at which they recited their office each day, heard Mass and kept their own devotional books. The chapel was dominated by a crucifix and a large altar fixed against the south end wall in those pre-Vatican II days. A free-standing altar later replaced this so that Mass could be said facing the congregation. On the left was also a shrine to Our Lady of Perpetual Succour, a devotion much encouraged by the Christian Brothers. On the South side of this icon was the door to a small sacristy which also served as a confessional for the school, where the school chaplain was available regularly. This sacristy issued onto a small cloister which connected the Brother's House with the school building.

On the North side of the icon a door led from the chapel to the Brother's Common room and library in the Brothers' House. This also served as the general staff room for the college which was most useful to the lay teachers. There were folding doors along the northern or entrance end of the chapel. These doors could be opened so that extra congregants could be accommodated outside. From time to time Masses were celebrated al fresco there. Other events were also held there such as school prizegivings. At the 1955 prizegiving, Archbishop Liston "presided on a decorated balcony" in front of the chapel. "The chapel became a focal point and the good habit of a visit to the Blessed Sacrament before and after school [was] maintained over 60 years". This chapel was demolished to free up access to the Brother L. H. Wilkes Technology Block which was opened in 2001.

=== 2001 chapel ===
This was a temporary pre-fabricated building located near the northern end of the quadrangle of the college (also known as the "Top Yard") until it was removed to allow the permanent school chapel to be constructed on the site and opened in 2020.

=== 2020 chapel ===
"The Chapel of St Peter", the current school chapel, was opened on 13 March 2020 in the upper yard of the school. It was built at an estimated cost of $3 million raised by the school community over more than a decade. It echoed the illuminated 11.5-metre (38 ft), 7.5-tonne (8-short-ton) inverted cross (Cross of Saint Peter) erected at the entrance to the college in 2017. Two hundred guests took part in the blessing ceremony led by the current school chaplain, Monsignor Paul Farmer. Students performed a Haka Pōwhiri and then most students watched the rest of the opening ceremony via live-feed on a large screen in the school gymnasium. During the service, the altar was consecrated and relics of St Peter Chanel and Blessed Edmund Ignatius Rice were placed in it. The walls of the chapel were also anointed. The headmaster, Mr James Bentley, said "that the building made a statement for all to see about what the college stood for and as a place of worship, not just for students and staff, but also for the wider community“. The first Mass was celebrated in the new chapel on Sunday, 15 March 2020.

The chapel is located adjacent to the school's top yard and it can be seen from Khyber Pass Road. The building was designed by Stevens Lawson Architects, the same firm that designed the inverted cross (which casts a shadow that is right side up during the day) at the college entrance. This inverted cross motif is also reproduced in the chapel. When sunlight pours through the chapel's skylight, an inverted cross shines through. The headmaster has said that the design for the chapel "presents a confident and identifiable cross to its most public face, not only to signify the building's purpose and all that the cross stands for, but also to provide a public message of God's love and our salvation". The main chapel houses two smaller sections; one has the chapel tabernacle, the other a statue of St Peter and a plaque in commemoration of every student who died while still at the school. The chapel is designed to give the students the feeling of a sacred space as they walk into it.

== Houses ==
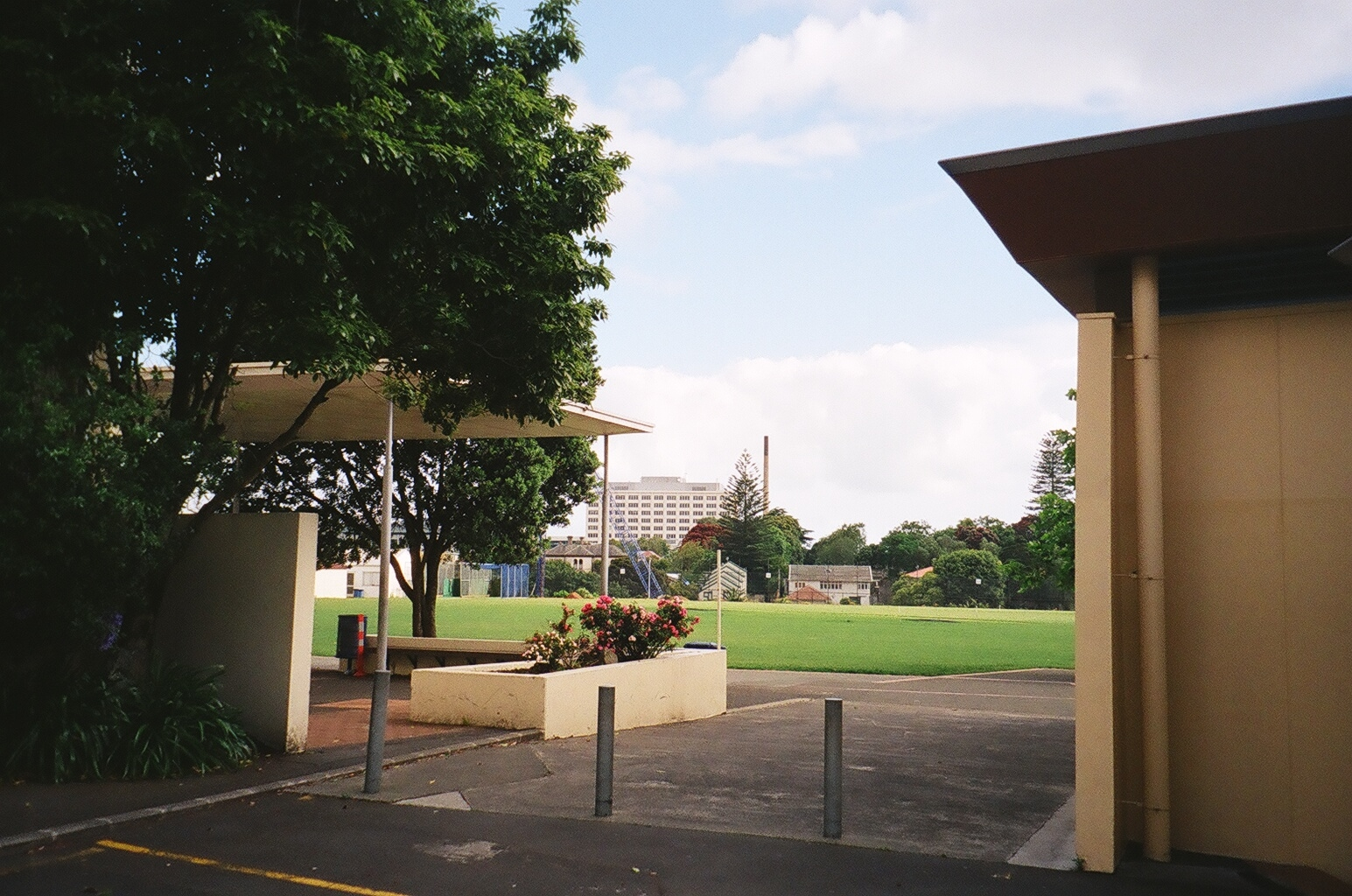
St Peter's College cricket field (St Peter's Oval) and Outhwaite Park (2009)

The St Peter's College houses are the basis of organisation in the school by year. Each year level has six house classes and each house class is the unit of attendance, pastoral care, competitive activity and many daily activities. There are house leaders (students) and house leaders (staff) assigned to each.

The houses and their colours and eponyms are:

- Bodkin – red – Dominic Fursey Bodkin
- Lynch – yellow – John Barnabas Lynch
- Nolan – blue – Patrick Joseph Nolan
- O'Driscoll – grey – Francis Pius O'Driscoll
- Rice – black – Edmund Ignatius Rice
- Treacy – green – Patrick Ambrose Treacy

Brothers Fursey Bodkin, Barnabas Lynch, Joseph Nolan, and their leader, Patrick Ambrose Treacy were Christian Brothers who arrived from Ireland in Melbourne on 15 November 1868 to establish the religious institute in Australia. In 1875 Brother Treacy visited Bishop Patrick Moran, first Catholic Bishop of Dunedin, and promised him a community of Christian Brothers. In 1876 Brother Bodkin was the leader of the new Dunedin community, the first Christian Brothers community in New Zealand. Bodkin, Lynch, Nolan and Treacy Houses date from the 1940s. O'Driscoll and Rice Houses were set up in 2011. Edmund Ignatius Rice was the founder of the Christian Brothers and Brother O'Driscoll was the foundation headmaster of the college.

== Headmasters ==
Ten individuals have served as headmasters of the College:

Number	Headmaster	Term start	Term end	Time in office	Notes
1	Br. Francis Pius O'Driscoll, c.f.c.	1939	1944	6 years	
2	Br. James Alexis Morris, c.f.c.	1945	1947	3 years	
3	Br. W. R. Smith, c.f.c.	1948	1953	6 years	
4	Br. K. V. Watson, c.f.c.	1954	1956	3 years	
5	Br. Patrick Celestine Ryan, c.f.c.	1957	1965	9 years	
6	Br. Benjamin Everard Ryan, c.f.c.	1966	1974	9 years	
7	Br. Noel Cuthbert Doherty, c.f.c.	1975	1979	5 years	
8	Br. John Paschal Prendergast, c.f.c.	1980	1988	9 years	First Old Boy headmaster. Last Christian Brother headmaster.
9	Kieran Francis Fouhy MNZM	1989	2015	27 years	First non-Christian Brother headmaster MNZM for services to education, 2016.
10	James Bentley	2016	incumbent		First headmaster to not come from a religious order (Kieran Fouhy was a former Marist Brother).

== Old Boys and former staff ==
Former pupils of the school are known as 'Old Boys'. They have the option of joining the St Peter's College Old Boys' Association.

- List of people educated at St Peter's College, Auckland
- List of former staff of St Peter's College, Auckland
- Congregation of Christian Brothers in New Zealand

Old Boys' experiences at St Peter's College (1940s–1970s):

- Mark Williams – academic and writer
- Sam Hunt – poet
- David McGill – writer
- John Tamihere – politician
- Frank Nobilo – golfer
- Felix Donnelly – priest
- Colin Jillings – racing horse trainer
- Cyril Eastlake – footballer
- Jonathan Temm – lawyer

For other experiences see: Matt Elliott, On This Rock: 75 Years of St Peter's College, Mountain Road, St Peter's College, Auckland, 2015.

== See also ==
- List of schools in New Zealand
- Education in New Zealand
- Catholic Church in New Zealand

== Notes ==
- ^a: Hato Petera College was latterly a coeducational school and closed in 2018. Sacred Heart College (1903) shifted to its present location in 1955. St Paul's College, although located on the first Sacred Heart College site, was founded in 1955.
- ^b: Robertson wrote that, to be fair to the Marist Brothers, it should be pointed out that their community in Auckland included one elderly brother who was at St Mary's Cathedral College, Sydney in 1910. At that time, the Marist Brothers had complained to the Archbishop of Sydney Cardinal Patrick Francis Moran about their working and living conditions. The Cardinal ordered them to leave the college. He directed the Christian Brothers (under threat of interdict) to take over the college in their place, which they did. The Cardinal then granted to the Christian Brothers the requests that the Marist Brothers had been denied. Robertson goes on to say that when the Christian Brothers arrived in Auckland, they were seen as moving in on Marist "territory" by some of the older Marist Brothers. However there is evidence that the relationship between the Christian Brothers and the younger Marist Brothers was positive in the early days of St Peter's College.
- ^c: A leading Marist Brother antagonist through this trouble was also named "Brother Benignus" (he held the positions of "Director" of Sacred Heart College 1927–1932 and Provincial of the New Zealand Province of the Marist Brothers 1932–1941). For more on the Marist Brother Benignus (and, other leading antagonists, Brothers Justin and Borgia), the territorial defensiveness of the Marist Brothers and the confusion relating to the St Peter's College site (the Outhwaite trust property), see Gallagher.
- ^d: The bequest was referred to by Liston in his speech at the opening of St Peter's College on Sunday 29 January 1939 at 3.30pm.
- ^e: Supposedly named after William Pember Reeves (1857–1932), journalist, poet, cabinet minister and New Zealand High Commissioner in London.
- ^f: The Auckland Catholic Netball Association which was founded in 1931 operated for many years on the netball courts at the corner of Mountain and Khyber Pass Roads in the St Peter's College grounds. In 2005 the Association leased the Windmill Road netball courts in Mt Eden and has operated its netball competitions there from 2006.
- ^g: O'Driscoll was founding Headmaster of St Columban's College, Caboolture, Queensland from 1928 until 1933 (first appointed at the age of 30); he was Headmaster of Christian Brothers' College, Highgate, Perth, 1949–1954 and 1962–1963; and was also Headmaster of at least two other Australian colleges.
- ^h: "One priest's life", an autobiography by Felix Donnelly, includes a description of his experiences at St Peter's in its early days and makes particular mention of Bros O'Driscoll and Skehan. "Father Forgive them" by Felix Donnelly is a novel which, inter alia, describes the hero's experiences at St Peter's and depicts several fictional Christian Brothers.
- ^i: Bro. Breach refers throughout this essay to the lessons learnt in the setting up of the St Peter's College Library.
- ^j: In November 1953, the Vatican awarded Liston the personal title of Archbishop.
- ^l: Father Peter Gherardi suggested that the Christian Brothers promoted boxing at St Peter's so that the boys could defend themselves against bullying.
- ^m: Rowing started in 1941 at St Peter's when boys joined the Auckland Rowing Club with intention of providing for mixed crews of members and boys.
- ^n "Square bashing" i.e. military training. This was an important element of life at St Peter's in the 1940s and 1950s. The St Peter's Cadet Corps won important trophies. On 1 March 1955 the Governor-General, Sir Willoughby Norrie visited St Peter's to present the Governor-General's trophy for 1954 to the "C" company of the college cadet corps.

== Bibliography ==
No author; sorted by publication name
- "Auckland". The Cyclopedia of New Zealand. Vol. 2. Christchurch: The Cyclopedia Company Limited. 1902.
- "Review Report, Auckland Grammar School". Education Review Office. November 2011. Archived from the original on 2 May 2014.
- "Review Report, St Peter's College, Epsom". Education Review Office. November 2012.
- "various". NZ Catholic : the national Catholic newspaper. 1996–2021.
- "Bro V. N. Cusack Tuckshop". St Peter's College Newsletter. No. 8/2006. 2 June 2006.
- "various". St Peter's College Magazines, 1948–present. Auckland: St Peter's College. 1948–2021.
- St Peter's College Silver Jubilee 1939 – 1964. Auckland: Christian Brothers Old Boys Association. 1964.
- "Their Own Station". Auckland Star. 15 September 1964. p. 4.
- "various". Zealandia. 1939–1989.
- "Auckland's First Catholic School – And its Latest". Zealandia. 26 January 1939. p. 5.
- "Auckland Welcomes the Christian Brothers". Zealandia. 2 February 1939. p. 5.
- "New Chapel at St. Peter's". Zealandia. 19 November 1953. p. 1.

By author

- Allen, James (1996). Growing Up Gay: New Zealand Men Tell Their Stories. Auckland: Godwit. pp. 106–108.
- Breach, Bro. Herbert Theodore Patrick (1956a). The educational work of the Christian Brothers in Australia and New Zealand (Unpublished thesis – DipEd). University of Auckland.
- Breach, Bro. Herbert Theodore Patrick (1956b). The school library an extended essay (Unpublished thesis – DipEd). Auckland University College.
- Bush, Graham W. A., ed. (2006). The History of Epsom. Auckland: Epsom & Eden District Historical Society Inc.
- Butchers, A. G. (1929). Young New Zealand. Dunedin: Coulls Somerville Wilkie Ltd.
- Cronin, Aimie (July 2015). "In God's Name". Metro. No. 395. Young, Simon (photographer). pp. 50–56.
- Cumming, Ian (1959). Glorious Enterprise: The History of the Auckland Education Board 1857–1957. Whitcome & Tombs Ltd.
- Donaldson, Graeme (2001). To All Parts of the Kingdom: Christian Brothers in New Zealand 1876–2001. Christchurch: Christian Brothers New Zealand Province.
- Donnelly, Felix (1978). Big Boys Don't Cry. Auckland: Cassell New Zealand.
- Donnelly, Felix (1982). One Priest's Life. Auckland: Australia and New Zealand Book Company. pp. 7–17.
- Donnelly, Felix (1990). Father Forgive Them. Wellington: GP Books.
- Edwards, Denis (1997). Vows: Nuns and Priests Speak Out. Auckland: Penguin.
- Elliott, Matt (2015). On This Rock: 75 Years of St Peter's College, Mountain Road. Auckland: St Peter's College. ISBN 978-0-473-331542.
- Elliott, Matt (1 October 2019). "Rocky Beginnings for a Catholic Boys' College". New Zealand Memories (140): 52–55.
- Eyre, Tony (2023). The Book Collector: Reading and Living with Literature. Dunedin: Mary Egan Publishing.
- Gallagher, Pat (1976). The Marist Brothers in New Zealand Fiji & Samoa 1876–1976. Tuakau: New Zealand Marist Brothers' Trust Board.
- Goldsmith, Paul; Bassett, Michael (2007). The Myers. Auckland: David Ling Publishing Ltd.
- Holman, Dinah (2010). Newmarket Lost and Found (2nd ed.). Auckland: The Bush Press of New Zealand.
- Laurenson, Helen (2019). The History of Mount Eden: the district and its people. Auckland: Epsom & Eden District Historical Society Inc. ISBN 978-0-473-46001-3.
- McGahan, Hugh (1992). Hughie: Hugh McGahan, Kiwi Captain. Christchurch: Nicholls Publishing. pp. 13–17.
- McGill, David (1996). I Almost Tackled Kel Tremain. Silver Owl Press. pp. 20–32.
- Mason, Andrew (2005). Henry Cooper of Auckland Grammar School. Auckland: David Ling Publishing for the Auckland Grammar School Old Boys' Association.
- Maxwell, Rick (2008). St Peter's College, Auckland. Auckland: Simerlocy Press.
- Millar, Sean (2007). Railway Stations of Auckland's Western Line: Boston Road to Waitakere before the 2004 upgrade programme (2nd ed.). Huia: Sean Millar.
- O'Neill, J. C. (1968). The History of the Work of the Christian Brothers in New Zealand (Unpublished thesis – DipEd). University of Auckland.
- Orejana, Rowena (13 February 2018). "Proposed chapel will make Khyber Pass Rd statement". NZ Catholic.
- Otto, Michael (27 June 2021). "Priest among Old Boys of Distinction at SPC". NZ Catholic. p. 14.
- Reid, Nicholas (2006). James Michael Liston: A Life. Wellington: Victoria University Press.
- Reid, Nicholas (2008). The Life and Work of Reginald John Delargey Cardinal. Auckland: Catholic Diocese of Auckland/Pindar.
- Robertson, Bro. Paul Malcolm (1996). Nga Parata Karaitiana The Christian Brothers, A Public Culture in Transition, A Comparative Study of the Indian and New Zealand Provinces (Unpublished thesis for MA in anthropology). University of Auckland.
- Ryder, Thomas J. (n.d.) [No date – perhaps c. 1990]. Following all Your Ways, Lord – Recollections of Fr Thomas J. Ryder. Transcribed by Margaret Paton. Privately published.
- Scholefield, G. H. (1940). A Dictionary of New Zealand Biography. Vol. 2. Wellington: Department of Internal Affairs.
- Simmons, Fr. E. R. (Earnest) (9 January 1977). "The first St Peter's School". Zealandia. p. 9.
- Simmons, Fr. E. R. (Earnest) (1978). A Brief History of the Catholic Church in New Zealand. Auckland: Catholic Publication Centre.
- Simmons, Fr. E. R. (Earnest) (1982). In Cruce Salus, A History of the Diocese of Auckland 1848 – 1980. Auckland: Catholic Publication Centre.
- Simmons, Fr. E. R. (Earnest) (1985). The Story of St Patrick's'. Auckland: Catholic Diocese of Auckland(?).
- Sweetman, Rory (2002). A Fair and Just Solution? A History of the Integration of Private Schools in New Zealand. Palmerston North: Dunmore Press.
- Tamihere, John; Bain, Helen (2004). John Tamihere Black and White. Auckland: Reed.
- Waters, Tony (2003). Confortare, A History of Sacred Heart College, Auckland 1903 – 2003: a Marist Brothers secondary school. Auckland: Sacred Heart College.
- Williams, Mark, ed. (1995). The Source of the Song; New Zealand Writers on Catholicism. Victoria University Press. pp. 9–10.
- Wilson, James Oakley (1985) [First published in 1913]. New Zealand Parliamentary Record, 1840–1984 (4th ed.). Wellington: V.R. Ward, Govt. Printer. OCLC 154283103.
- Wilson, Simon (July 2015). "24 things to know before you choose a school". Metro. No. 395. Young, Simon (photographer). pp. 40–49.
