= Felix Donnelly College =

Location
- Six sites including Tuakau, Ōtara and Kawakawa Bay
- Coordinates: 37.2527°S 174.9626°E

Information
- Type: State, not integrated
- Established: 2000
- Closed: 2011
- Socio-economic decile: 1
- Website: www.fdcschool.com

Felix Donnelly College was a state special school with six sites in the Auckland region of New Zealand. The school is named after Felix Donnelly (1929–2019), a Roman Catholic priest who gained notoriety in the 1970s for his outspoken views on the Church's stance on sexuality.

A Ministry of Education commissioner was appointed to the school to address issues that concerned the Ministry. The Education Review Office has repeatedly raised concerns about the school and in May 2009 suggested that action should be taken that may result in closure of the school.

The school was closed in January 2011 due to a history of serious management and governance issues.

== See also ==
- List of schools in Auckland
