= Kevin Malloy =

New Zealand businessman

Kevin Malloy (born 1963) is an advertising executive currently based in Auckland, New Zealand but with international roles. He is responsible for Starcom MediaVest Group's (SMG) Coca-Cola assignments globally and is also the VivaKi Country Chair responsible for Starcom, ZenithOptimedia and Razorfish across Australia and New Zealand.

== Background ==
Malloy is from Auckland, New Zealand. He was educated at St Peter's College. As a 21-year-old Malloy left for London, and ended up in the advertising agency DMB&B where he spent nine years, six of which were in the "International Media" operation. In 1994 he was moved to Hong Kong as Regional Media Director and after two years was sent to New York City to be groomed for a role as Worldwide Media Director. Malloy returned home at the end of 2002 after six years in New York and 17 years away. From his Auckland base he still looks after the global assignment for Coca-Cola and oversees Publicis Groupe's media and digital operations across New Zealand and Australia.

== International management ==
Before the formation of MediaVest, Malloy held the position of Executive Vice President, Worldwide Media Director at D’Arcy. He was a key member of the D’Arcy media team that won the P&G AOR assignment in the U.S. – at the time the biggest advertising assignment in history (US$1.2 billion). He spent a total of six years in New York City.

Prior to moving to New York in 1996, Malloy spent two years at D’Arcy’s Hong Kong office as regional media director for Asia-Pacific. Before that, Malloy was based in D’Arcy London for nine years. During that time, he spent three years working in the United Kingdom operation before taking on full European media responsibilities for such multi-national clients as Procter & Gamble (P&G), Budweiser, Mars and Philips.

After seventeen years abroad, Malloy relocated back to Auckland, New Zealand in December 2002 where he initially continued to play a key role for Starcom MediaVest Group by maintaining his global role on both P&G and Coca-Cola while overseeing SMG’s operations in Australia and New Zealand. In October 2008 Malloy was asked to take on the newly formed position of VivaKi Chair for Australia and New Zealand. This role encompassed SMG and ZenithOptimedia in these markets and required the launch of Publicis Groupe’s key digital asset Digitas. Malloy has now dropped his role on P&G with the expanded VivaKi requirements but continues to travel extensively as he continues to lead SMG’s global efforts on Coca-Cola.

Malloy’s international career has involved numerous speaking engagements and industry recognition. In 1998, he was named one of Advertising Age’s worldwide ‘Media Innovators’ following Media and Marketing Europe’s designation as one of the world’s ‘Top 40 Under 40’ media people in 1997. Malloy has also contributed to such publications as Advertising Age International, A&M Magazine, Media Magazine and The Economist.
