= Tony Eyre =

New Zealand non-fiction writer

Tony Eyre FCA (born Auckland 1953) is a New Zealand non-fiction writer and accountant with particular interest in the creative sector. He writes journalism and books on historical or literary subjects, focuses on creative nonfiction and essay and feature writing and is a regular contributor to newspapers and magazines.

== Personal ==
Eyre, whose father's name was Peter and who had four siblings, spent his childhood in Avondale and Mount Albert in Auckland. He was educated at Marist School, Mount Albert and St Peter's College, Auckland, where he studied, particularly, Latin, French, History and English in his six years there. His childhood home was filled with books often reflecting his father's interest in Auckland marine history and New Zealand art. The artist Jane Eyre was a relative.

Eyre and his wife Yvonne Fogarty live in the Dunedin harbour suburb of Vauxhall. They have four adult children.

== Career ==
Eyre became an accountant and relocated to Dunedin in 1978 where he established an accounting practice in premises once occupied by the publisher A H Reed. He merged his practice with JW Smeaton Ltd in 2007 and retired in 2024. His accounting practice largely focussed on the Otago creative community, with many of his clients being artists, writers, and musicians.

His writing covers a broad range of New Zealand subjects with a particular interest in Dunedin social history and biography. In 2023 he published "The Book Collector" which is a "bibliomemoir" of the writer's reading, the books and authors that have touched him, and how they have shaped his passion for book collecting. His other publications include the 2013 eBook, "Winter of Discontent: A Story about Dunedin Opposition to the 1981 Springbok Tour". He has also written many articles which have appeared in the Otago Daily Times.

== Other initiatives ==
Eyre is a former member of the Ralph Hotere Foundation Trust which is the guardian of the legacy and intellectual property of a very significant New Zealand artist. He is also the chair of the Dunedin Athenaeum and Mechanics' Institute. He was a member of the Permanent External Advisory Committee (PEAC) of the Dunedin School of Art at Otago Polytechnic from 2004. He is also a trustee of the Archibald Baxter Memorial Trust, The Patricia France Charitable Trust, and Dunedin Public Libraries Heritage Foundation.
