= Richard O'Sullivan (teacher) =

New Zealand school inspector (1826–1889)

- Born: 1826
- Died: 1889 (aged 62–63)
- Occupation: Schoolteacher

Richard James O'Sullivan (1826–1889) was a New Zealand teacher and school inspector. He was born in Kilkenny, County Kilkenny, Ireland, in about 1826. He was a teacher at St Peter's School, Auckland and taught many early native-born Aucklanders, including later cabinet ministers, John Sheehan and Joseph Tole, Mayor of Auckland Peter Dignan and Charles and William Outhwaite.
