= Felix Donnelly =

New Zealand priest (1929–2019)

Father Felix Cornelius Donnelly ONZM (23 November 1929 – 26 August 2019) was a New Zealand priest of the Roman Catholic Diocese of Auckland. He was well known as a social activist, writer, academic and radio talkback host.

== Early life ==
Donnelly was born in Christchurch, the son of a journalist. He was educated at St Peter's College, Auckland (1941–1946). He gained an MA from the University of Auckland and a PhD (1977) from the same institution.

== Pastoral career ==
Donnelly studied for the Catholic priesthood at Holy Cross College, Mosgiel (1947–1953). He was ordained a priest for the Roman Catholic Diocese of Auckland by Archbishop Liston on 19 July 1953. He was Director of Religious Education for the Auckland Diocese 1962–1971. In 1964–1965, he studied pastoral theology at the Lumen Vitae Catethetical Institute in Brussels Lumen which contributed to his sometimes controversial reform of religious education in Catholic schools with less emphasis on rote learning and church regulation and the encouragement of students to examine in group discussions the practical living out of their Christian commitment. He was also considerably influenced by the Second Vatican Council 1962-1965. By 1970 Donnelly had relinquished his religious education role and had turned to more general social support initiatives for youth.

== Social concern ==
Donnelly was the founder and long-term director of the Youthlink Family Trust. In 1970 Donnelly was instrumental in founding Youthline, a telephone counselling helpline service for youth, run by youth, which still continues. He also established the Youthline Hostel as a home for troubled youth in Auckland in 1971. For 20 years Donnelly was a talk back host on Radio Pacific. Donnelly was a prolific writer of non-fiction and wrote one novel. Felix Donnelly College was named after him. Donnelly was a public advocate for Homosexual law reform in the 1980s. This contributed to the passing of the Homosexual Law Reform Act 1986.

== Academic career ==
As an academic, Donnelly was Director of the Department of Community Health and Department of Psychiatry and Behavioural Science at the University of Auckland, Faculty of Medical and Health Sciences from 1972 until his retirement in 1994.

== Honours and awards ==
In 1990, Donnelly was awarded the New Zealand 1990 Commemoration Medal. In the 1998 Queen's Birthday Honours, he was appointed an Officer of the New Zealand Order of Merit, for services to the welfare of youth.

== Death and contribution ==
Donnelly died in Auckland on 26 August 2019 at the age of 89. Donnelly was a controversial commentator on issues in relation to human sexuality. His views were often seen to be in conflict with the teachings of the Catholic Church but, although his ministry was at times limited, Donnelly remained a priest of the church. Bishop Pat Dunn of Auckland said that one of the great strengths of Donnelly was his kindness and strong sense of compassion. "While there were times when Felix disagreed with church teaching and practices, one could always be sure that the safety and welfare of those in his care was paramount. In many way, he was ahead of his time, and all of us owe him a debt of gratitude for the compassion and honesty he brought to his work."

== Bibliography ==
- Assembly prayers, (compiler), James M. Liston, Auckland 1964.
- Prayers for young children, (compiler), Imprimateur: James M. Liston, 1964.
- Big Boys Don't Cry, Cassell New Zealand, Auckland, 1978 (republished by Allan & Unwin; Port Nicholson Press, Wellington, 1985).
- Candles in the wind, Cassell New Zealand, Auckland, c1979.
- Time to talk : counsellor and counselled (editor), Felix Donnelly, Auckland; George Allen & Unwin, Sydney. 1981.
- One Priest's Life, Australia and New Zealand Book Company, Auckland, 1982. (autobiography)
- Flames & ether : a personal view of sexuality, Allen & Unwin, Sydney, Australia and Port Nicholson Press, Wellington, 1984
- Who cares?, Australia and New Zealand Book Company, Auckland, 1984.
- Youthlink story, Allen & Unwin/Port Nicholson Press, Wellington, 1987.
- World upside down, Penguin Books, Auckland, 1988.
- Teenage sexuality [illustration, Mike Yule; editor, Graeme Leather], GP Books, Wellington, c 1989.
- Father Forgive them, GP Books, Wellington, 1990. (a novel)

== See also ==
- Roman Catholicism in New Zealand
- Denzil Meuli - a near contemporary Auckland priest who had a completely different basis for dissent.

== Sources ==
- Felix Donnelly, One Priest's Life, Australia and New Zealand Book Company, Auckland, 1982.
