= Patrick Ambrose Treacy =

Australian Roman Catholic educationist

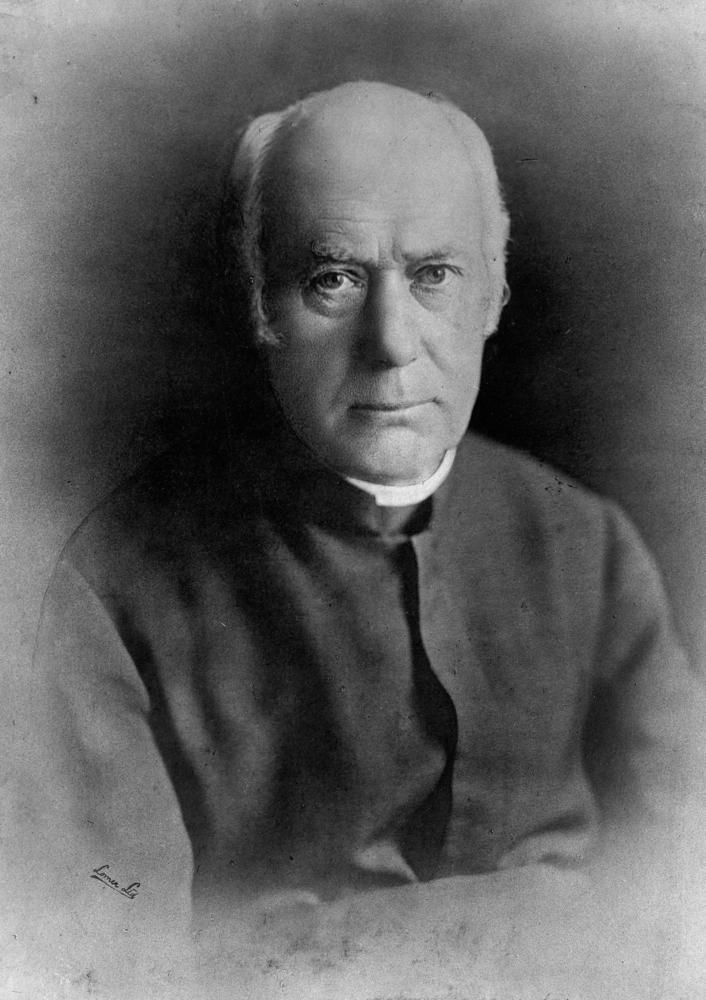
- Born: 31 August 1834; Thurles, County Tipperary, Ireland
- Died: 2 October 1912 (aged 78); Spring Hill, Queensland, Australia
- Occupation: educationalist

Patrick Ambrose Treacy CFC (31 August 1834 – 2 October 1912) was a Roman Catholic educationist who established the first permanent Christian Brothers community in Australia in 1868.

== Early life ==
Treacy was born on 31 August 1834 in Thurles, County Tipperary, Ireland. Educated at an academy and the local Christian Brothers' school at Thurles, he excelled in mathematics. In February 1852 he joined the Congregation of Christian Brothers, Waterford. After a rigorous course he was posted to various local schools for experience and also continued his studies, including part-time courses under the aegis of the Science Museum, South Kensington. After eight years of teaching at Wexford schools he became headmaster of the Christian Brothers' schools in Carlow. Showing administrative skill he achieved high teaching efficiency and improved school buildings and equipment.

== Victoria, Australia ==
In 1868, James Alipius Goold, the founding Roman Catholic Bishop and Archbishop of Melbourne, Australia, asked the Christian Brothers, as well as other orders, to establish schools in Victoria, Australia. Treacy was sent as leader of the Christian Brothers, together with three confrères Dominic Fursey Bodkin, John Barnabas Lynch and Patrick James Nolan, who arrived in Melbourne in the Donald McKay in November 1868 to find the Catholic school system receiving some state aid, but in a parlous condition under the control of local parish priests. Treacy opened a primary school in Lonsdale Street, Melbourne in 1869. Undaunted by lack of money, Treacy initiated a colony-wide campaign to finance land and buildings. With generous help from colonists of all creeds, Parade College was erected in Victoria Parade on Eastern Hill. The school opened in January 1871, and its final cost was about £12,000.

In 1872, the Victorian colonial government passed the Education Act 1872 (Vic), which set up a system of 'free, compulsory and secular' education in Victoria, controlled by an Education Department. The Catholic Church, unlike other Australian churches, determined to retain and pay for its own comprehensive alternative system of education. Having observed the deplorable state of diocesan schools during his collecting tours, Treacy advocated to the Catholic Education Committee a rise in teachers' salaries and a training college. State aid was withdrawn from church schools around 1880. Treacy offered to train as teachers senior boys selected from his own system. There were no funds for a teachers' college but his further offer to inspect metropolitan schools was accepted.

Treacy's report on the condition of the system resulted in up-to-date equipment, and under him the Brothers organised a training scheme for their aspirants.

In 1888, the Christian Brothers established St Alipius' Primary School in Ballarat, and took over the running of St Patrick's College, Ballarat in 1893. By 1900, when Treacy retired after thirty years as a provincial superior, he had established 27 schools in the principal cities of Australia, and one in New Zealand.

== Teacher training ==
At first they were trained in the schools, but in 1897 Treacy used a recent foundation in Lewisham, New South Wales, as a training centre under a qualified master of method. He also arranged for several trained Irish Brothers to migrate each year.

== Success ==
Treacy extended the studies of the more talented of his pupils beyond the primary level and presented them for civil service and matriculation examinations. Small classes at Victoria Parade College and St Patrick's, Ballarat, taught by Brothers Nugent and Kennedy respectively, achieved eminent success in these examinations. In the early days not many boys sat for matriculation, but many entered both the civil service and commerce. At this time there were no Irish secondary schools; it was Treacy's initiative and dedication that shaped the pattern of the Australian Christian Brothers' higher education without regard to pupils' social or financial standing. Gifted with great prudence and business acumen, Treacy also acceded to the requests of the hierarchy to open schools in many parts of Australia.

== End days ==
Treacy was recalled to Ireland in 1900 as an assistant to the superior-general, and returned to the Australian province in 1910. Although retired, he insisted on working and was sent to Brisbane in a bid to prolong his years in a warm climate. He died at St Joseph's College, Gregory Terrace, on 2 October 1912.

== Legacy ==
Ambrose Treacy College in Indooroopilly, Brisbane is named after him. The Treacy Centre at Trinity College, Perth is named after him.
