= Dominic Fursey Bodkin =

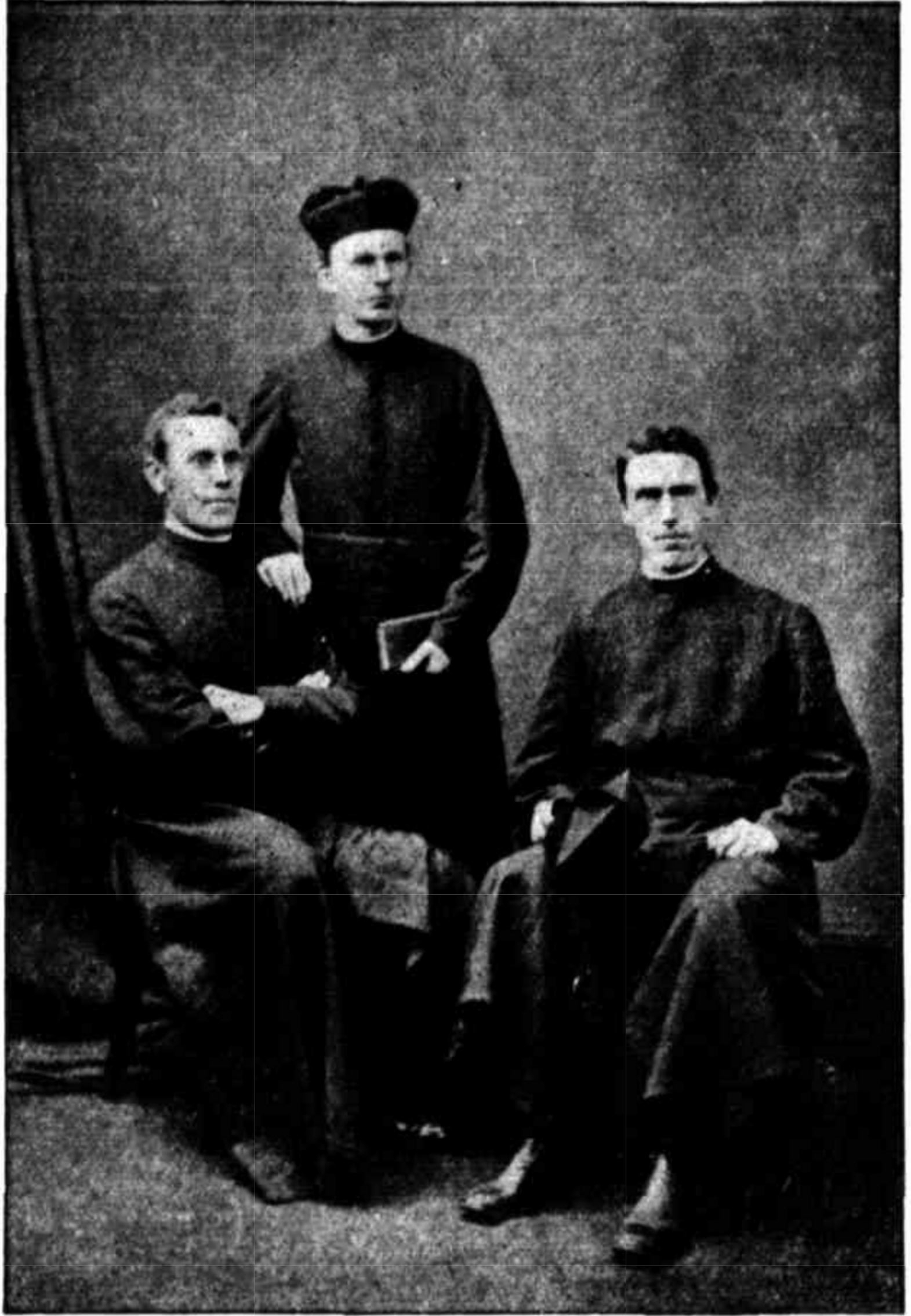
Three of the pioneer Christian Brothers in Australia: Bodkin, Treacy and Lynch

Dominic Fursey Bodkin (23 July 1843 – 20 February 1929) was a Christian Brother and a Catholic educator in Australia and New Zealand.

== Early life ==
Bodkin was born near Tuam, County Galway, Ireland in 1843. He attended the Christian Brothers school in Tuam.

== Religious life ==
Aged 16 years, Bodkin entered the novitiate of the Christian Brothers in Dublin. He taught in a number of schools during his training, but mostly in Waterford.

Archbishop of Melbourne James Alipius Goold believed there was a need for religious teachers for schools in his diocese. In 1867 Goold visited Europe and with the assistance of the Cardinal Prefect of Propaganda (now the Congregation for the Evangelization of Peoples) he obtained the assistance of a group of Irish Christian Brothers. Bodkin, John Barnabas Lynch, Patrick Joseph Nolan and Patrick Ambrose Treacy left Ireland for Melbourne to establish the Christian Brothers in Australia, arriving in Port Philip Bay on the Donald Mckay on 18 November 1868. In 1869 they established their first school at the rear of St Francis Church in Elizabeth Street, Melbourne. Their monastery and second school, Parade College, was established in Victoria Parade, East Melbourne.

On 24 April 1876, Bodkin opened a school in Rattray Street, Dunedin, New Zealand, becoming its first principal. In 1989 this school merged with other Catholic schools in Dunedin to become Trinity Catholic College (formerly Kavanagh College).

Bodkin was the first principal of St Joseph's College, Nudgee in Brisbane, Queensland, which opened in 1891.

He returned to Dunedin and then about 1904 moved to Western Australia where he worked with orphans on farm schools.

== Later life ==
Aged 85 years, Bodkin died on 20 February 1929 at Clontarf Orphanage, Western Australia.
