= McAtamney =

McAtamney is an Irish surname. The name is translated from the Gaelic “Mac an tiompanaigh”

” meaning “son of the drum player” or “timpani player”. This name is most common in the province of Ulster with counties such as Armagh and Derry being the most common. Notable people with the surname include:

- Frank McAtamney (1934–1998), New Zealand rugby union player
- Jude McAtamney (born 2000), Irish-American football player
- Mairéad McAtamney (born 1944), Irish camogie player
