= Congregation of Christian Brothers in New Zealand =

The Congregation of Christian Brothers in New Zealand is part of the Congregation of Christian Brothers, a Catholic religious institute, and has been established in New Zealand since 1876. Its particular charism is the education of boys and in New Zealand it has been responsible for eight schools and has launched other educational initiatives.

== Background ==
The Christian Brothers were founded in Waterford, Ireland in 1802 by Edmund Ignatius Rice who was beatified in Rome in 1996. He was a wealthy committed Catholic businessman noted for his charity toward the poor. The death of his wife shortly after the birth of a handicapped daughter was a catalyst in his life. It deepened his spirituality which made him more aware of the needs of the marginalised especially young boys who lacked education in faith, literacy, and numeracy and often lacked the basic necessities of life. He established schools for these boys despite the fact he had no teacher training and was in his early forties. Gradually other men, often businessmen like himself, joined him inspired by his charity and compassion. Other schools spread rapidly throughout Ireland.

By the time of his death in 1844 his considerable fortune had been spent in establishing schools. In his lifetime schools had been set up in England, and by the turn of the century schools were founded in America, India, South Africa, Australia, and New Zealand.

== History ==
The Christian Brothers arrived in New Zealand in 1876 with the opening of a secondary school in Dunedin, the Christian Brothers School. From the arrival of the Christian Brothers, New Zealand was administered as part of the Australasian province incorporating Australia, New Zealand and, from 1950, Papua New Guinea. In 1959, New Zealand became St Joseph's Vice-Province. This resulted in New Zealand Brothers returning to work in their home country and many Australian brothers went in the opposite direction. In 1966 New Zealand became a full Province of the institute.

In recent years, especially following the integration of their schools into the New Zealand state education system and with aging membership and a lack of recruits, the New Zealand Christian Brothers have generally moved away from teaching in and managing schools and have refocused on those at the margins of society. There is still, however, strong support for the New Zealand schools and a focus on establishing and supporting schools in Oceania, Africa and the Philippines.

In 2007, the Christian Brothers provinces in Australia, New Zealand and the Pacific (including St Joseph's Province, New Zealand) were abolished and replaced by one new Oceania Province which was itself sub-divided into twelve "clusters". Each cluster leader is responsible for the pastoral care of the Brothers in the cluster as well as encouraging close links with the Edmund Rice Ministries and Edmund Rice Network in that cluster area. The New Zealand Cluster included in 2007: the Christian Brother Communities at Young Street Dunedin, 24A Wharenui Road Christchurch, 24B Wharenui Road Christchurch, Rarotonga, Murupara, Ōtorohanga, the Edmund Rice Community Westport, the Edmund Rice Community Auckland and the Mission Sisters/Christian Brothers community in Ōpōtiki.

The other clusters in the Oceania Province were: Papua-New Guinea Cluster; NSW Cluster A; NSW Cluster B; NSW Cluster C; Victoria & Tasmania Cluster A; Victoria & Tasmania cluster B; Victoria & Tasmania cluster C; Queensland cluster A; Queensland cluster B; South Australia Cluster; and Western Australia Cluster.

== New Zealand Province leaders ==
The provincials of the province were:

- Br Christopher Claver Marlow (1959–1965)
- Br Patrick Celestine Ryan (1966–1972)
- Br Patrick Aiden McManus (1972–1984)
- Br Michael Benignis Scanlan (1984–1996)
- Br Brian Joseph Lauren (1996–2007)

== New Zealand Cluster leaders 2007– ==
- Br John O'Shea (2007– ?)
- Br William "Bill" Dowling (2018–2024)

== Christian Brothers initiatives ==
Schools associated with the New Zealand Christian Brothers include:

- Christian Brothers School, Dunedin
- Christian Brothers High School, Dunedin
- Edmund Rice College, Rotorua
- John Paul College, Rotorua
- Liston College, Henderson, Auckland
- Nukutere College, Avarua, Rarotonga, Cook Islands
- St Edmund's School, South Dunedin
- St Kevin's College, Oamaru
- St Patrick's Primary School, Oamaru
- St Paul's High School, Dunedin
- St Peter's College, Epsom, Auckland
- St Thomas of Canterbury College, Christchurch
- Trinity Catholic College, Dunedin

Other projects

- Edmund Rice Community, Murupara, Bay of Plenty
- Edmund Rice Sinon Secondary School, Arusha, Tanzania.

== See also ==
- Zealandia, 1939–1989.
- St Peter's College Magazines, St Peter's College, Auckland, 1960–2008.
- St Peter's College Silver Jubilee 1939 – 1964, Christian Brothers Old Boys Association, Auckland, 1964.
- J.C. O'Neill, The History of the Work of the Christian Brothers in New Zealand, unpublished Dip. Ed. thesis, University of Auckland, 1968.
- 1876–1976: The First 100 Years in New Zealand at Christian Brothers School Dunedin, Christian Brothers School Centennial Committee, Dunedin, 1976.
- Redcastle Recollections, A Golden Jubilee Volume, St Kevin's College, Oamaru, 1977.
- Felix Donnelly, One Priest's Life, Australia and New Zealand Book Company, Auckland, 1982, pp. 7–17.
- St Thomas' Jubilee 1961–1986, St Thomas of Canterbury Jubilee Committee, Christchurch, 1986.
- Barry M Coldrey, The Scheme: The Christian Brothers and Childcare in Western Australia, Argyle-pacific Publishing, O'Connor, Western Australia, 1993.
- NZ Catholic: the national Catholic newspaper, 1996–present.
- Paul Malcolm Robertson, Nga Parata Karaitiana The Christian Brothers, A Public Culture in Transition, A Comparative Study of the Indian and New Zealand Provinces, an unpublished thesis for MA in Anthropology, University of Auckland, 1996.
- Graeme Donaldson and J. P. Stumbles, Dunedin Rugby Football Club, 1871–1996 : 125 years history of the Club, The Club, Dunedin, 1997.
- Liston College, 25th Jubilee Magazine, Liston College, Auckland, 1999.
- Peter Joseph Norris, Southernmost Seminary: The History of Holy Cross College, Mosgiel (1900–1997), Holy Cross Seminary, Auckland, 1999.
- Graeme Donaldson, To All Parts of the Kingdom: Christian Brothers In New Zealand 1876–2001, Christian Brothers New Zealand Province, Christchurch, 2001.
- Bridget (Anderson) Harrod, 100 Years Catholic Education in Rotorua 1903–2003, St Mary's Catholic Primary School, Rotorua, 2003.
- Graham W.A. Bush, The History of Epsom, Epsom & Eden District Historical Society Inc, Auckland, 2006.
- Nicholas Reid, James Michael Liston: A Life, Victoria University Press, Wellington, 2006.
