= Oamaru Opera House =

Opera house and former town hall in Oamaru, New Zealand

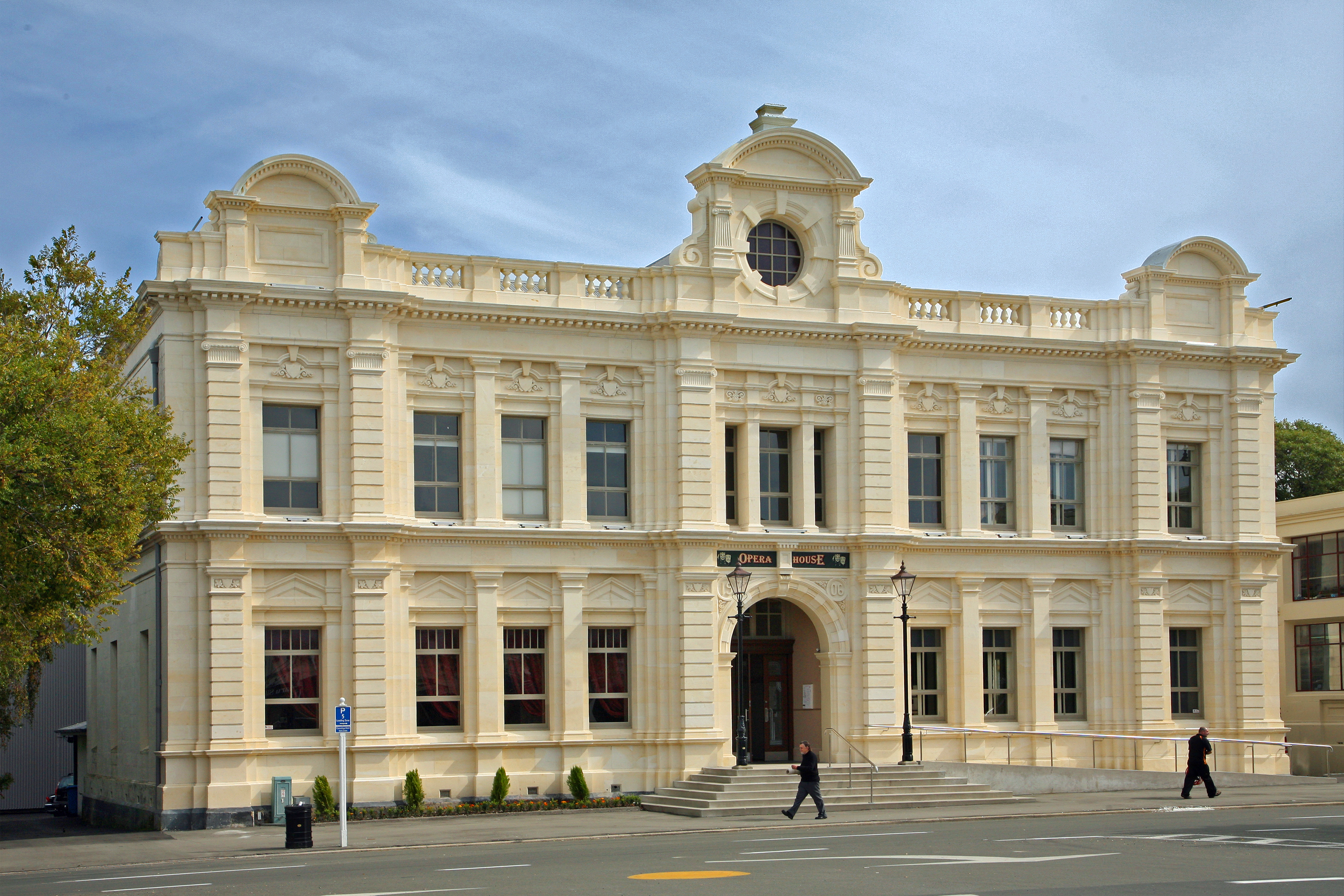
- Oamaru Opera House
- Interactive map of the Oamaru Opera House area
- Former names: Oamaru Town Hall

General information
- Architectural style: Edwardian Baroque
- Location: 90 Thames Street, Oamaru, New Zealand
- Coordinates: 45.098603°S 170.970322°E
- Construction started: October 1906
- Completed: 8 October 1907

Design and construction
- Architect: John Megget Forrester

Website
- oamaruoperahouse.co.nz

Heritage New Zealand – Category 1
- Designated: 13 December 1996
- Reference no.: 7356

The Oamaru Opera House and former Town Hall in Oamaru is a historic building and current performance venue in Oamaru, on the east coast of the South Island of New Zealand. The building is classified as a "Category I" ("places of 'special or outstanding historical or cultural heritage significance or value'") historic place by Heritage New Zealand Pouhere Taonga, previously known as the New Zealand Historic Places Trust.

== History ==
The first borough council offices in Oamaru were in a wooden building on the south side of the Thames Street Bridge, occupied since the 1860s, but by the turn of the century were considered too small for hosting civic events, as well as being "old and unsightly". The only public hall in Oamaru, the Theatre Royal, had been lost to redevelopment which made the situation more urgent. Mayor Robert Milligan instigated the purchase of land for a new town hall in 1905, and the Council called for designs. Oamaru architect John Meggett Forrester won the competition. Forrester was the son of another local architect Thomas Forrester.

Builders Winsley and Sons were contracted to construct the building for £10,600, although the design was then altered to include both a second storey and a concert hall.

== Construction and style ==
Sir Joseph Ward laid the foundation stone in October 1906, and the building was officially opened on 8 October the following year. The building is constructed of the local Oamaru stone, in the Edwardian Baroque style.

The auditorium had a raked floor to the orchestra pit, an upstairs gallery, and seated 1007 people. The town hall and council chambers were lit by gas, while the Opera House was lit by electricity.

According to conservation architect Chris Cochran the building ‘is a significant example nationally of the Edwardian Baroque style, a bold and assertive design that proclaims the prosperity and pride of the town of Oamaru...The design significance is particularly evident in the interior – particularly the Proscenium arch, circle, council chambers, and the plaster ceilings in the theatre circle."

The Opera House was used to show moving pictures and live acts, political meetings and town celebrations. The former Council Chambers house memorial honour rolls.

The building was registered by the New Zealand Historic Places Trust as a Category I item in December 1993, with registration number 7356.

== Refurbishment ==
Changes to the floor plan over the years have included removal of walls and construction of new stairs. The Opera House was refurbished in 1997 to include a new ground floor theatre. The foyer was also upgraded and strengthening work carried out to the overall structure. A further redevelopment in 2009 won the Public Architecture category of the 2010 Southern Architecture Awards and the 2011 New Zealand Institute of Architects Heritage award for Heritage Conservation.

The current building includes a 500-seat auditorium, a cafe, a black box theatre and conference venue. Besides a complete range of civic functions, the Opera House has hosted theatre, ballet, concerts, cinema and boxing.

In 1989, the Oamaru Borough council was combined with Waitaki County, Waihemo County, and Palmerston Borough councils to create Waitaki District Council. The Waitaki District Council has been based nearby at 20 Thames Street, in the former Post Office building, since 1994.
