= Gordon Whiting =

New Zealand lawyer (1942–2018)

Judge of the Environment Court
- In office 1997–2012

Personal details
- Born: Robert Gordon Whiting; 16 March 1942 Oamaru, New Zealand
- Died: 6 November 2018 (aged 76) Auckland, New Zealand
- Spouse: Susan Barron (m. 1969)
- Children: 4
- Education: University of Otago
- Profession: Barrister and solicitor

Robert Gordon Whiting (16 March 1942 – 6 November 2018) was a judge of the Environment Court of New Zealand and on boards of inquiry that dealt with many important environmental issues.

== Early life ==
Whiting, who was of Irish descent, was born in Oamaru in 1942 and attended St Kevins College in Oamaru. He studied economics and law at the University of Otago, graduating BA LLB in 1967. He was admitted as a barrister and solicitor in 1968, and practised in Whangārei, particularly in criminal law as both a prosecutor and defence counsel.

== Career ==
Whiting was deeply involved in important and complicated issues including power generation, infrastructure, landfills, Commercial and industrial development, subdivisions, coastal issues and sensitive landscape (especially the productions of guidelines for the landscape profession) and the review of regional and district plans under the New Zealand Resource Management Act 1991.

Some cases that he presided over for the Court, and later on boards of inquiry, included the Tongariro Power Development Flood Control Scheme reconnecting appeals, geothermal power station appeals, the Waikato Expressway Designation Hamilton Section Appeals; the King Salmon Board of Inquiry, the Basin Reserve Board of Inquiry, Canterbury water allocation cases for the Canterbury Regional Council, the Te Kuha Coal mine inquiry on the West Coast and the Rena wreck consents in the Bay of Plenty. Whiting also heard and determined a number of strategically important cases on policy instruments for infrastructure and natural resource use around Lake Taupō and the Waikato River.

== Death ==
Whiting died in Auckland on 6 November 2018.
