= Owen Tracey =

New Zealand flying ace of WWII (1915–1941)

- Born: 15 March 1915; Dunedin, New Zealand
- Died: 8 December 1941 (aged 26) near El Adem, Libya
- Military career
- Allegiance: New Zealand
- Branch: Royal Air Force
- Service years: 1939–1941
- Rank: Flight Lieutenant
- Units: No. 274 Squadron; No. 79 Squadron
- Conflicts: Second World War; Battle of Britain; Battle of Crete; Operation Crusader
- Awards: Distinguished Flying Cross

Owen Vincent Tracey DFC (15 March 1915 – 8 December 1941) was a New Zealand fighter pilot and flying ace who flew in the Royal Air Force (RAF) during the Second World War. He was officially credited with the destruction of at least six enemy aircraft.

Born in Dunedin, Tracey joined the RAF in early 1939. After completing flight training, he was posted to No. 79 Squadron in July 1940. He flew extensively during the Battle of Britain, shooting down a number of German aircraft. In April 1941, he was sent to the Middle East where he flew with No. 274 Squadron. During his time with the squadron, he was involved in the Battle of Crete and in Operation Crusader, in Libya. He was killed when he was shot down during a dogfight with Italian fighters.

== Early life ==
Born on 15 March 1915 in Dunedin, New Zealand, Owen Vincent Tracey was the son of Owen Tracey and Margaret née Laffey Tracey. He went to school in Auckland, at Monte Cecilia College, and in Oamaru, at St Kevin's College. After completing his education, he worked as a storeman for a firm in Dunedin.

Interested in aviation, Tracey learnt to fly at the Otago Aero Club and in 1937 obtained his 'A' licence with some financial assistance from his mother. He applied twice that year for a short service commission in the Royal Air Force (RAF) but was declined, supposedly due to a lack of vacancies. Another application, made in April 1938, was also unsuccessful and he discovered that his school grades were insufficient. He received private tuition from the headmaster of Mosgiel District High School and following this, a subsequent application made later in the year was successful. A scheduled departure in February 1939 for the United Kingdom had to be postponed for health reasons and it was not until the middle of the year that he left New Zealand aboard the SS Rimutaka. Arriving in England on 1 August, he proceeded to No. 19 Elementary & Reserve Flying Training School at RAF Fairoaks shortly afterwards, where he flew de Havilland Tiger Moths.

== Second World War ==
Having proceeded to No. 3 Initial Training Wing, the Second World War had broken out by the time Tracey had completed his flight instruction and was consequently awarded wings. He was granted a short service commission, for four years, and was made an acting pilot officer with effect from 9 October 1939. He went on to No. 3 Service Flying Training School at South Cerney for further training and in late April 1940 was assigned to an instructors course. The following month he went to No. 60 Operational Training Unit to convert to the Hawker Hurricane fighter.

=== Battle of Britain ===
On 6 July, Tracey was posted to No. 79 Squadron. At the time, his squadron, which operated the Hurricane, was based at Biggin Hill but shortly afterwards moved to RAF Acklington, in the Midlands, forming part of the area's aerial defences. Under the control No. 13 Group, it fought in several engagements over the North Sea and in one of these, an interception on 15 August of a large Luftwaffe (German air force) raid heading for Newcastle, Tracey destroyed a Heinkel He 111 medium bomber.

No. 79 Squadron returned to Biggin Hill on 26 August and was promptly heavily engaged in the aerial battles over London as the Luftwaffe began to focus its efforts on the city. On 28 August, Tracey claimed a He 111 as probably destroyed and also damaged a Messerschmitt Bf 109 fighter. His Hurricane was damaged in the encounter and he landed back at Biggin Hill, just as it was being bombed. Attempting to take off, he had to abort his effort due to his aircraft receiving shrapnel damage from nearby bomb blasts. Although he was unhurt, other RAF personnel were killed in the bombing raid. Two days later, about 20 miles (32 km) south of Biggin Hill, he destroyed another He 111. The following day, 31 August, he shot down a Dornier Do 17 medium bomber over Dungeness in Kent.

On 5 September Biggin Hill was again targeted by an incoming bomber raid, but No. 79 Squadron was able to intercept it. Tracey claimed a Do 17 as probably destroyed. A few days afterwards the squadron was sent to Pembrey for a rest and refit and from here it resumed operational flying, mostly convoy patrols with the occasional interception of bombing raids on the area around the Bristol Channel. On 21 September, Tracey claimed a Do 17 as probably destroyed 15 miles (24 km) west of St David's Head in southwest Wales. He was confirmed in his pilot officer rank in November.

=== Middle East ===
In early 1941, Tracey was assigned to service overseas and, in March, was posted to No. 274 Squadron, which was stationed at El Amiriya in Egypt. At the time he joined the squadron, it was resting after having been engaged in operations against Italian forces in Libya. In April, Tracey was promoted to flying officer.

During the Battle of Crete, No. 274 Squadron, now based further west in Egypt, at Gerawla, flew in support of the Allied forces on the island, flying patrols over the shipping in the area and strafing the German forces that had landed on Crete. During this time, on 26 May, Tracey destroyed a Junkers Ju 52 transport plane over Maleme. A Bf 109 then chased him and Tracey went into a dive; while he pulled out, his pursuer did not and crashed into the sea. Tracey was credited with this Bf 109 as an aerial victory. Three days later, while patrolling over the Royal Navy ships evacuating Allied forces from Crete, Tracey shot down a Junkers Ju 88 medium bomber.

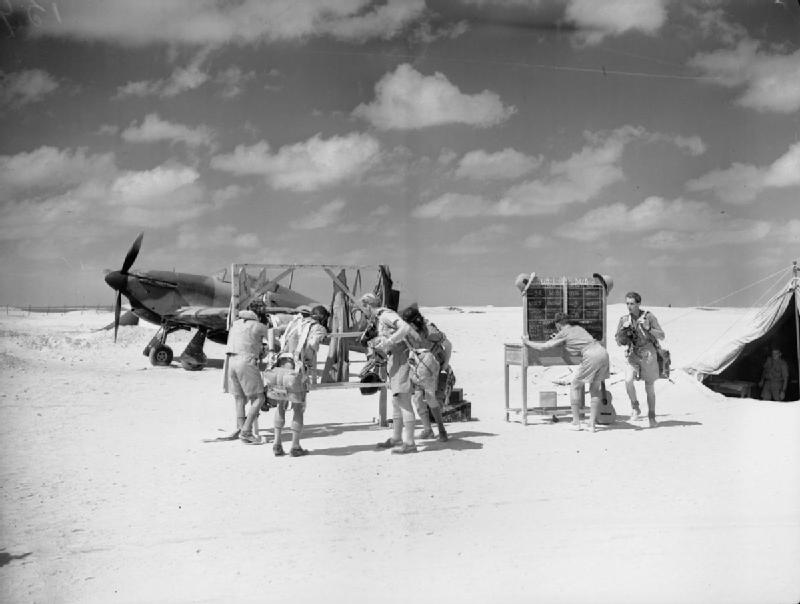
Pilots of No. 274 Squadron at Amirya airfield

The following month No. 274 Squadron was back to operations over the Western Desert, still flying from Gerawla. Tracey was promoted to flight lieutenant in late August and was appointed one of the squadron's flight commanders. The squadron mostly carried out ground support operations, strafing Axis transports and troops. During Operation Crusader, while flying in the Sidi Rezegh area on 1 December, one of the squadron's Hurricanes, piloted by Lieutenant Hoffe of the South African Air Force, force landed in the desert, close to the Axis ground troops. Tracey made a landing to pick up Hoffe and returned him to base.

On 8 December, No. 274 Squadron was engaged in an escort mission, accompanying Bristol Blenheim light bombers attacking Axis positions to the southwest of El Adem. They encountered German and Italian fighters and engaged them. However, their opposition were soon reinforced and the RAF fighters became outnumbered. Tracey was seen engaging a Macchi C.200 fighter of the Regia Aeronautica (Italian Air Force) but his Hurricane received machine gun fire to the cockpit area and dived into the ground, where it burst into flames. Tracey was given a battlefield burial near his crashed aircraft.

Tracey was posthumously awarded the Distinguished Flying Cross, the announcement being made in The London Gazette on 6 October 1942. The citation noted Tracey's feat in rescuing Hoffe and also credited him with six enemy aircraft destroyed. Aviation historians Christopher Shores and Clive Wiliams credit him with six German aircraft destroyed, three probably destroyed and one damaged.

After the war, Tracey's remains were reinterred at Halfaya Sollum War Cemetery in Egypt. He was survived by his wife, Frances née Slater, who he had married in England, and his son, and they subsequently emigrated to New Zealand and settled in Tracey's home town of Dunedin.
