= St Joseph's School, Oamaru =

St Joseph's School

Location
- 36 Usk Street, Oamaru; 45.092553°S 170.970669°E

Information
- Type: State integrated co-ed primary
- Motto: Latin: Veritas (Truth)
- Patron saint: St Joseph
- Established: 1882
- Sister school: St Kevin's College, Oamaru
- Ministry of Education Institution no.: 3825
- Principal: Sara Jones-Hogan
- Enrolment: 227
- Socio-economic decile: 6
- Website: Official website

St Joseph's School is a school in Oamaru, the largest town in North Otago, in the South Island of New Zealand. It was established by an order of Catholic nuns — Dominican Sisters — who started teaching in Oamaru in 1882. It is associated with St Patrick's Basilica, Oamaru

St Joseph's School is to be rebuilt on the campus of St Kevin's College while retaining its separate identity with the two schools schools having a common board.

== History ==
In 1884 the first classrooms were in the presbytery - up to five classes were taught there. The school was staffed by Dominican nuns. Priests visited the school taking an interest both in examinations and in cultural activities such as musical events.

In 1928 the Christian Brothers took over the running of St Patrick's primary school for boys in Oamaru and two Christian Brothers commuted daily from St Kevin's College (founded in 1927).

That school continued until a reorganisation in 1973 saw its closure. The younger boys went to St Joseph's while the older boys transferred to St Kevin's College. St John's School operated for the year 7 and 8 boys on a site adjacent to the lower end of St Kevin's College drive. In 1983 there was a further reorganisation in which the St Joseph's became a full primary school for both boys and girls up to year 8. St John's School was closed and St Kevin's became a coeducational secondary school with classes for boys and girls beginning from year 9. The red-brick building built for St Patrick's is now used for junior classes of St Joseph's while the older pupils are taught in newer buildings, closer to St Patrick's Basilica in Reed Street.

The school continues to maintain its Dominican connection especially with the starting of a "Dominican choir" in 2008. The school remains closely associated with St Kevin's College, and reports that 99% of its pupils go there after they leave St Joseph's.

In 2012, Miss Melanie Sloan managed the middle syndicate. She has early onset rheumatoid arthritis and had her knee and hip joints replaced to relieve the disabling pain which had confined her to a wheelchair. In 2010, she received a Spirit of Attitude award for being "an unsung hero who lives life with positivity while facing extreme adversity." She was presented with the supreme award for her positive attitude by minister Nick Smith in Auckland. She later moved to the United Kingdom, and returned to New Zealand in 2020.

== Current status and activity ==
The school lists student leadership as a major strength, reporting that pupils from years 3-8 sit on the school council.

There is a colony of little blue penguins in Oamaru and the students studied these as a research project to develop their essential skills and fulfil level 4 learning objectives in English, Social Studies and Science.

This was a Living Heritage project of the 2020 Communications Trust to promote digital literacy and so the main goal of the project was to construct a website about the penguins. This followed a similar project of bird monitoring performed as part of the Ministry of Education's LEARNZ programme.

St Joseph's School is to be transferred into the St Kevin's College site and thus provide a completely new school for St Joseph's and concentrate all Oamaru Catholic education on one site while also providing a use for "The Stables", a heritage buildings of St Kevins.
