= The Libratory =

Art museum in Oamaru, New Zealand

Coordinates: 45°6′8.59″S 170°58′14.17″E

- Established: November 2010
- Location: The Woolstore Complex, 1 Tyne Street, Oamaru, New Zealand
- Type: Art museum
- Owner: Damien McNamara

The Libratory is New Zealand's first dedicated steampunk art gallery, created by Oamaru artist Damien McNamara (also known under the pseudonym Damotimus Tipotus). Opened in November 2010, It provides local steampunk fans a gallery in which to display their artwork and sculptures. The venue is located on the first floor of the Woolstore, next to Steampunk HQ, and hosts monthly swap meets, where the district's steampunkers exchange ideas, sell goods, and model their fashions. The Libratory changed hands in 2012 and is now branded the Gadgetorium.
