= St. John McLean Buckley =

St. John McLean Buckley (1869 – 6 August 1915) was a New Zealand sheep farmer. He was the son of politician George Buckley.

Buckley was born in Waikakahi in the Canterbury Region. He was sent to England for his education, and studied law at the University of Oxford. After returning to New Zealand in 1891 he managed several sheep estates for his uncle John McLean. When McLean died in 1902, he left his estate to Buckley. Buckley subsequently built a large brick homestead at Redcastle, which is now St Kevin's College, Oamaru.

Buckley died on 6 August 1915. His estate was valued at £166,884. He was buried in the old Oamaru cemetery.
