= St Patrick's Basilica, Oamaru =

St Patrick's Basilica
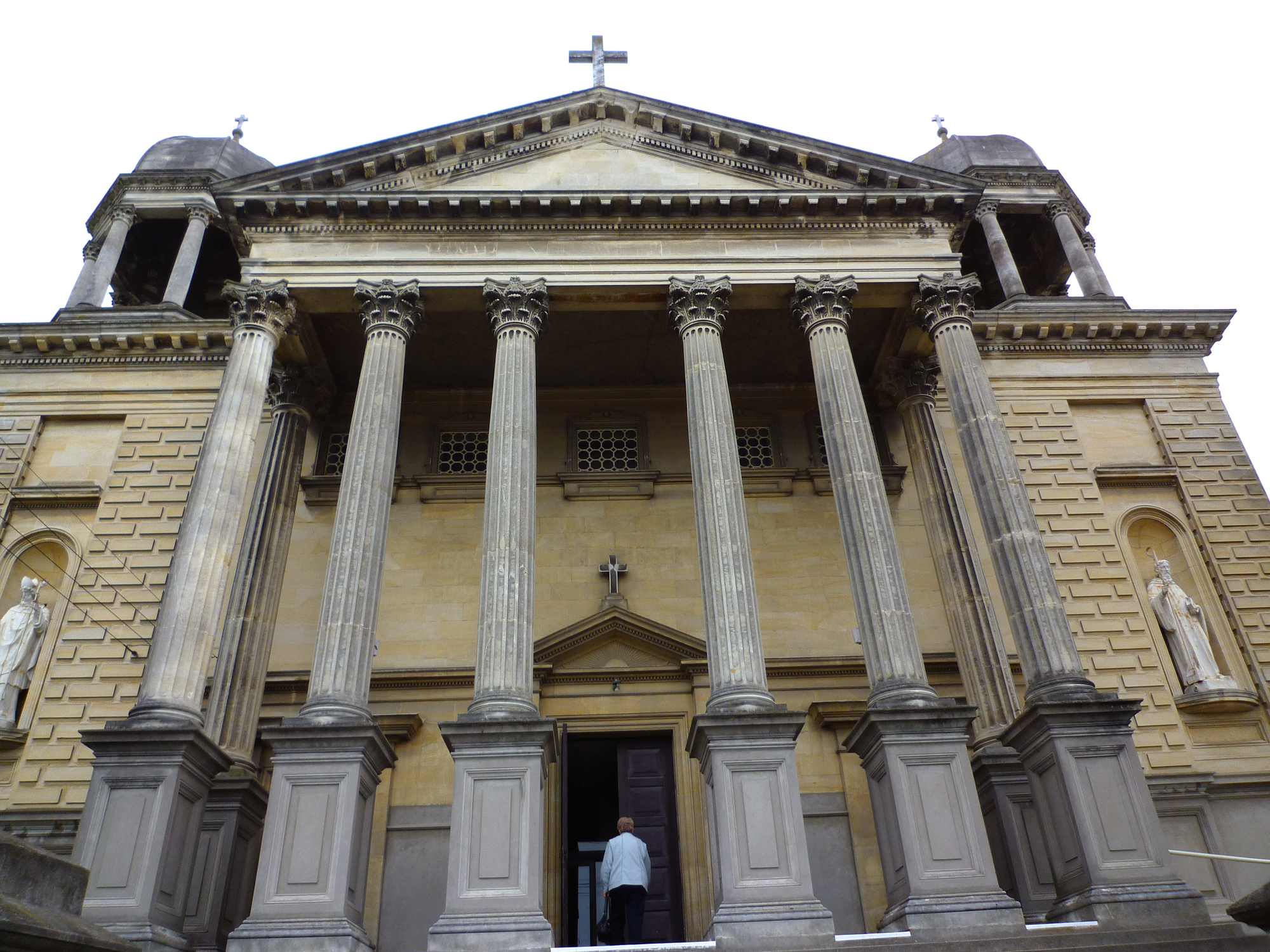
- St Patrick's Basilica frontage
- St Patrick's Basilica
- 45°05′34″S 170°58′11″E
- Location: Oamaru, North Otago
- Country: New Zealand
- Denomination: Roman Catholic

History
- Status: Parish church
- Founded: 18 November 1894
- Dedication: St Patrick

Architecture
- Functional status: Active
- Heritage designation: Category I (No 58)
- Designated: 2 April 2004
- Architect: Francis Petre
- Architectural type: Palladian Revival
- Style: Roman Renaissance
- Groundbreaking: Trinity Sunday 1893
- Completed: 8 December 1918
- Construction cost: £13,000

Specifications
- Materials: Oamaru stone

Administration
- Province: Wellington
- Diocese: Dunedin
- Parish: St Patrick's

Heritage New Zealand – Category 1
- Designated: 2 April 2004
- Reference no.: 58

The St Patrick's Basilica or Oamaru Basilica, as it is popularly known because of its style of architecture, is a Catholic church in Oamaru, New Zealand. It was designed by the prominent New Zealand architect Francis Petre and is one of his most celebrated works. It is one of the most important historic buildings of Oamaru and of the North Otago region. The Basilica's classical portico and three domes are an admired feature of the Oamaru townscape and the building is particularly noted for the high quality of the stone carving and fine plasterwork of its architectural features. The Basilica "must surely have one of the noblest church interiors in the country. Built entirely of Oamaru stone the exterior has weathered more than one would have expected, but inside the church glows with reflected light from the creamy stone which is virtually in its original state." "The interior is bathed in abundant natural light, and with clear glass rather than stained in the high nave windows, the quality of light is enhanced."

== Basilica ==
St Patrick's Basilica is an important example of the work of Francis Petre. The Basilica is an aesthetically imposing building that makes a vital contribution to the streetscape. It stands at the end of a long street (Usk St) leading from the Oamaru shore and ending at the great portico of the building. This Portico is composed of eight Corinthian columns of Oamaru stone (six in front, two behind), whose pedestals rest on elongated plinths, and a high pediment closely reflecting those of a Roman or Greek temple. However, the church's palladian heritage is emphasised by the front dome on each side and the great dome behind. The Irish character of the church's early clergy and congregation is attested to by the great statues of St Columba on the left and St Patrick on the right. The building's bulk, form and architectural styling are impressive. The interior is richly decorated, with two impressive ranges of carved limestone Corinthian columns creating colonnades along the nave, completed by the pressed zinc ceilings, wooden pews and religious sculptures. Light floods in from the clerestory above. On the ceiling plaster cornices frame the richly ornamented pressed-zinc panels. "The Basilica is culturally significant emphasising the importance of the Roman Catholic Church to Oamaru, and is a landmark for the town. The design is technically accomplished and forms a vital element in Petre's Basilican architectural ouvre and the building is among his most well known and iconic works. The Basilica is an important component in Oamaru's white-stone architecture, characteristic of the township, and is as well the key component of the group of buildings associated with the Catholic Church in Oamaru [(presbytery, school buildings and large convent- all located near the Basilica)] ."

== Foundation ==
The inspiration and effort behind the building of St Patrick's came from Father (later Monsignor) John Mackay, who became Parish Priest in Oamaru on 3 March 1890. He wished to build a church that would suit the needs of his congregation and began fundraising. By April 1893 he had enough money to start on the building. On an earlier trip to Europe, he had seen buildings he considered would suit the needs of the Oamaru Parish and he had commissioned Francis Petre to put his observations and ideas into a practical design. The laying of the foundation stone coincided with the silver jubilee of ordination of Mackay, who was parish priest of Oamaru for 36 years (1890–1926) and who supervised the construction of the Basilica from its commencement in 1893 until its final completion 25 years later in 1918. The foundation stone was laid on Trinity Sunday 1893, by Bishop Moran of Dunedin. The successful tender for the construction of the church had been made by D.W. Woods: £3,460 exclusive of the sanctuary and dome. The whole building was to be of Oamaru stone, cut from the nearby quarry at Weston, Mr Joseph Kelly of Weston being the Quarry contractor.

== Nave ==
The first contract was for the nave, organ loft and temporary sanctuary only. Petre used concrete on the outer lower portion of the main walls of the nave to a height of seven feet. He also specified that the floor of the organ loft be of poured concrete. By November 1894 this was finished and the church was dedicated on 18 November with the front portico, a flight of steps, the two front domes, the main dome, the permanent sanctuary, sacristies, tribunes and side chapels yet to be bulilt.

== Ceiling ==
In 1898, the coffer type ceiling that was originally designed in wood panels and mouldings, was completed in zinc supplied by Wunderlich & Co. of Sydney, New South Wales. The richly embossed zinc, while giving an impression of massiveness, was actually light and had the advantage of being an excellent resonator, greatly improving the acoustic of the Basilica. Five shades of colouring were utilised on the 78 squares of zinc and this work was undertaken by McKay assisted by some of the "best" pupils of the convent school. This colouring work was done before the ceiling was erected.

== Frontage ==
McKay, who was unremitting in his efforts to complete the building, pressed on with fundraising by means of bazaars and raffles to finance the next stage of the construction. This involved the front portico, the flight of steps, the two front domes and the carving of the columns. The completion of this stage was celebrated on 26 April 1903. The stone work for this stage was done by Messrs. Fergusson, Given & Co. and Mr David Given carved the columns and pilasters. It was noted at this time that the Oamaru Basilica was the first building in New Zealand in which domes had been adopted. Early descriptions of the building stated that it was as near as possible for modern purposes, severely Greek, not only in general design but also in its constructional features, but the introduction of domes and arches, meant that it deviated somewhat from the transom and colonnade of the old Greek models. It is actually a palladian revival building.

== Completion ==
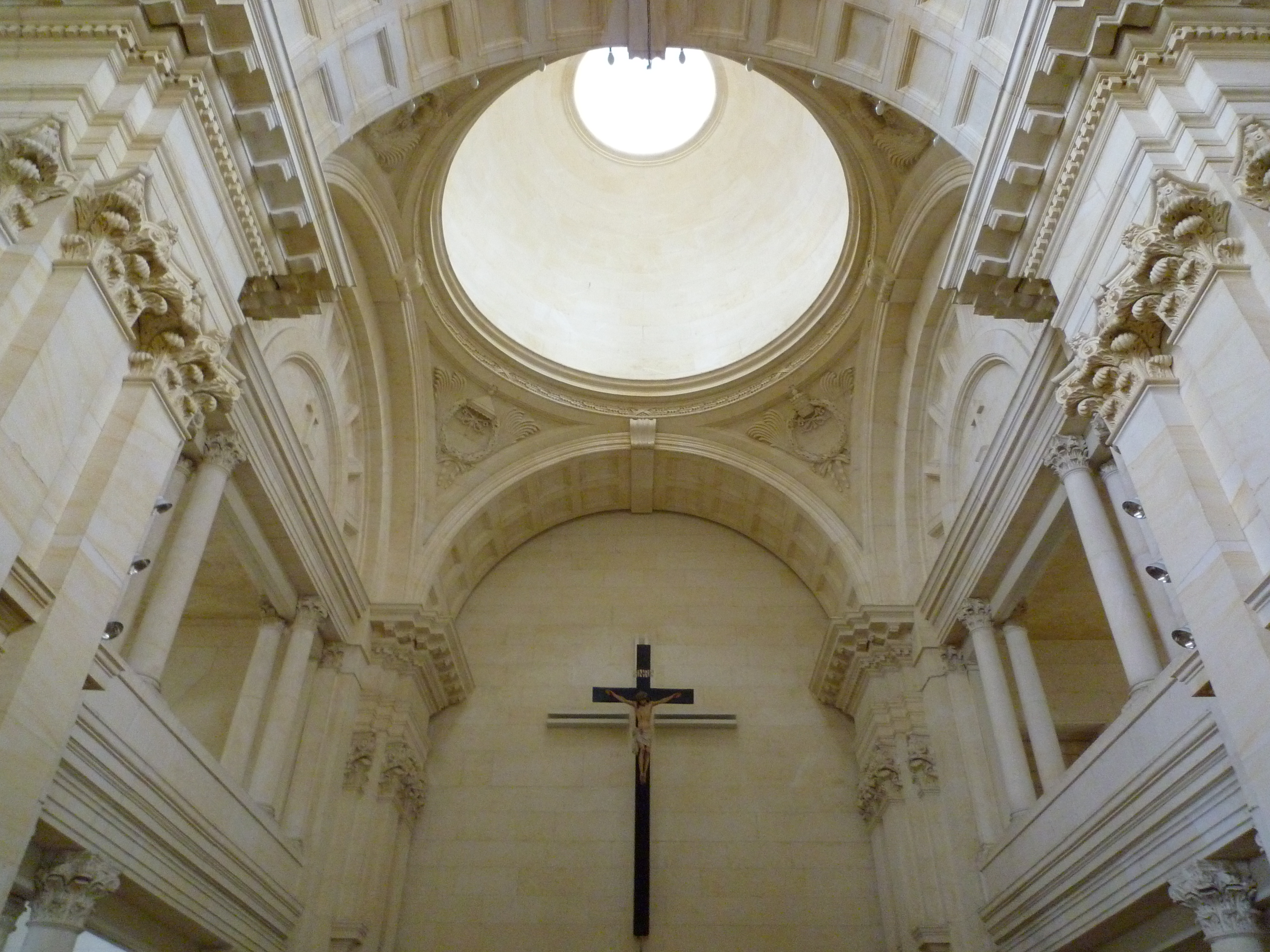
St Patrick's Basilica, Oamaru, crossing and main dome interior.

In 1917 construction began on the permanent sanctuary, sacristies, tribunes, side chapels and the main dome. Considerable excavation was necessary to take the massive foundations needed to support the 150 foot dome. On 3 June 1917, the "corner stone" (the second foundation stone for the building) was lowered into position. Bishop Verdon of Dunedin "plied the trowel" and carried out the ceremony. The dome is not located above the crossing, the normal placement, but above the sanctuary. Petre had already adopted this revolutionary approach in the Cathedral of the Blessed Sacrament, Christchurch completed in 1905. This last stage of St Patrick's Basilica was completed in 1918, 25 years after the first foundations were laid. The final cost of the building was £13,000.

== Opening ==
The opening ceremonies were carried on 8 December 1918. Monsignor McKay, the driving force behind the whole concept from start to finish, was by now celebrating the golden jubilee of his ordination and on the day, was highly praised for his untiring work over so many years on the basilica project. He was presented with appropriate gifts. Two days after the official opening, Francis William Petre died on 10 December 1918.

== Organ ==
In 1915, a highlight in the Basilica's history had been the installation of a positive pipe organ "which added greatly to the meaning of the services as well as enhancing the skills of the choir."

== Changes ==
There have been minor alterations and additions to the Basilica in the ensuing years, such as removal of the main altar, the stone communion rails, the stone pulpit, the addition of confessionals, under floor heating and the removal of the slate roof and its replacement with long run iron, but these cosmetic changes have detracted little for the original design of the church.

== See also ==
- Oamaru stone
- Oamaru
- North Otago
- Diocese of Dunedin
- St Joseph's School, Oamaru
- St Kevin's College, Oamaru
