= St Kevin's College, Oamaru =

Location
- 44a Taward Street; Oamaru; New Zealand; 45.0674°S 170.9832°E

Information
- Type: Integrated co-educational secondary, years 9-13
- Motto: Latin: Facere et Docere ('To Do and To Teach')
- Patron saint: Saint Kevin
- Established: 6 February 1927; 99 years ago
- Founder: Congregation of Christian Brothers
- Sister school: St Joseph's School
- Ministry of Education Institution no.: 369
- Principal: Jo Walshe BA, Dip Tch, Grad Dip (Theo), Grad Dip (RelSt)
- Chaplain: Fr Fredy 'The Aura Man' Permentilla
- Years: 9–13
- Enrolment: 483 (July 2026)
- Campus: St Kevins College Redcastle
- Socio-economic decile: 7O
- Affiliations: Roman Catholic, Christian Brothers, Dominican Sisters
- Website: www.stkevins.school.nz/

St Kevin's College (also called Redcastle) in Oamaru, New Zealand, is a Catholic, coeducational, integrated, boarding and day, secondary school. It was founded by the Christian Brothers in 1927 for boys and became a co-educational school in 1983 on the closing of St Thomas's Girls' Secondary School operated by the Dominican Sisters. The college became a state integrated coeducational school in the same year. The Christian Brothers ceased to be on the teaching staff of the college in the late 1990s but remained the school's proprietor, and so appointed representatives to the college board until 2019 when they transferred the ownership of St Kevin's College to the Catholic Bishop of Dunedin.

The Catholic primary school for Oamaru, St Joseph's primary School is to be rebuilt on the St Kevin's College campus while retaining its separate identity with the two schools governed by a common board.

== History ==
=== Proposal ===
The establishment of a Catholic boarding school for boys in Otago was first proposed in 1890. However, it was not until 1925 that the preparations for the establishment began. The Bishop of Dunedin, James Whyte, asked the Christian Brothers to set up the school. They had, from 1876, conducted the Christian Brothers School in Dunedin. This school had for a time taken boarders in a hostel which operated from 1919 until 1924. Various sites were inspected by the Bishop and the Provincial of the Christian Brothers, P. I. Hickey, and the property called "Redcastle" in Oamaru was chosen as the most suitable site.

=== Campus ===
The site of the college was originally developed by the McLean and Buckley families. John McLean was born on the island of Mull, Scotland, in 1818. He (with his brothers) made his fortune in developing and exploiting High Country sheep stations (particularly "Morven Hills" in the Lindis Pass) and by selling them at the right time.

McLean purchased the Oamaru land in 1857 as part of much larger block for about 10/- an acre. Much of it was sold off, but he retained the area which is now the school, and he resided there from the 1860s. By 1871 he was running 10,000 sheep on the property. He was the Oamaru member for the Otago Provincial Council and he was also a member of the New Zealand Legislative Council (1867–1872). He died in 1902 and the land passed to his nephew, St. John McLean Buckley.

The original homestead was one-storied with a thatched roof. When the old house burned down, Buckley built the red brick residence with Oamaru stone facing, now known as the "Castle" and, since he was very fond of horse-racing, he built large stables (now a school building named "The Stables"), St John Buckley died in 1915 and his son, also named John Buckley, sold the property to a syndicate of local people. Designed by Dunedin architect John Burnside, the property was called "Redcastle" and is heritage listed.

Redcastle was known for its beauty and its sporting associations (particularly those of St John McLean Buckley – He was, apart from his horse racing interests, president of cycling, coursing, gymnastic and tennis clubs). The homestead (the "castle") was (and is) a significant country house. The property comprising 40 acres (160,000 m^{2}) was purchased by the Christian Brothers at a cost of £8000 in 1925 and a further 10 acres (40,000 m^{2}) were added, at a cost of £1000, in 1928. The present campus thus has an area of 27 hectares.

In May 1926, Brother Moore, who had experience in fund-raising, came to Dunedin to organise a bazaar and lottery to fund the purchase of the land and the establishment of the college. His confrere, Brother Dowd, toured the country districts to collect donations. These initiatives resulted in a fund of £7000. In 1926, the construction of the buildings began under the supervision of Brother Prunster.

=== Commencement ===
The college was named after the Irish saint, Kevin (498–618), the founder of the monastery and school of Glendalough. The blessing and opening of the college took place on Sunday, 6 February 1927. There were several Bishops present: Archbishop Redwood and Bishops O'Shea, Whyte, Cleary, Brodie and Liston. There were many priests and more than 2,500 friends and well-wishers present coming from Dunedin and nearby parts of both Otago and Canterbury. Classes commenced on Tuesday, 8 February 1927. There were 60 boarders and 31 day students. The Christian Brothers on the first staff were Brother Magee (the Rector) and Brothers Bowler, Brennan, Le Breton, Dowd, Ryan, Mills and Maye. The Rector of Waitaki Boys' High School, Frank Milner, was present at the opening. When Frank Milner ("a firm friend of St Kevin's") died in 1944, the St Kevin's Boys formed a guard of honour for his remains as they left the church after the funeral service.

=== Ethos ===
For its first 56 years, St Kevin's College was typical of Christian Brother boarding institutions in Australia and New Zealand. They were designed to provide a Catholic education for the sons of rural Catholic families. For the Christian Brothers they were places of particularly hard work. Individual Brothers taught throughout the day, coached sports teams after school, supervised meals and study, and were responsible for the dormitories at night. The Brothers generally had to be young men with energy.

=== Juniors ===
In 1928 the Brothers took over the running of St Patrick's Primary School for boys and two brothers commuted daily from the college. In 1974 this school amalgamated with St Joseph's School conducted by the Dominican Sisters. But year 7 and 8 boys (aged 11 and 12) were enrolled at St Kevins and they were taught at St John's School (by Dominican sisters, Sisters Peter, Denise and Gemma). St John's was located adjacent to the lower end of the college drive. This school too was amalgamated with St Joseph's School in 1983. In that year St Joseph's School became a full primary school and St Kevin's became a secondary school only with classes beginning with year 9 students (both boys and girls).

St Joseph's primary School is to be rebuilt on the St Kevin's College site and thus provide a completely new school for St Joseph's (which would continue to have a separate identity) and concentrate all Oamaru Catholic education on one site while also providing a use for "The Stables".

== Overview ==
=== Enrolment ===
In 2019, St Kevin's College had a roll of about 450 students including approximately 80 boarding students and 370 day students. Its gender composition in 2019 was female 50% and male 50%. Although in recent Years it has been noted that-for the first time in the college's history there is a majority of girls attending the school. In that year, the college's maximum roll under the Education Act 1989 was 465 pupils. In 2016, its ethnic composition was NZ European/Pākehā 70%, Asian 10%, Pacific 5% and Māori 10% and other 5%. St Kevin's College has a strong Catholic focus.

As a state-integrated school, St Kevin's College charges New Zealand-resident students compulsory attendance dues. For the 2025 school year, the attendance dues payable is $1,015 per year.

As of July 2026, the school has roll of 483 students, of which 51 (10.6%) identify as Māori.

As of 2026, the school has an Equity Index of 447, placing it amongst schools whose students have below average socioeconomic barriers to achievement (roughly equivalent to decile 7 under the former socio-economic decile system).

=== Character ===
In February 1983 St Kevin's became co-educational. Until 1979 girls boarded at Teschemakers, a secondary school located about 12 km south of Oamaru and at St Thomas's Girls Secondary School until the merger of the two schools. St Kevin's College currently has boarding capacity for over 100 students. Also in 1983, the college was integrated as a college with a "special character" under the Private Schools Conditional Integration Act 1975.

The special character is broadly the connection of the school with the Catholic faith. Preference of enrolment is given to students who have established a link with the Catholic Church through baptism or membership of a parish. Preference is decided by the appropriate parish priest in each case. A preference certificate from the student's parish is required for each student with their application for enrolment at the school. Under the Act, the school may enrol "non-preference" students but the enrolment of such students is restricted to 5% of the total roll.

Students come mainly from Oamaru and the surrounding rural areas (many of them ex-pupils of St Joseph's School, Oamaru) with some coming from more distant New Zealand and overseas locations. The school benefits from modern facilities and spacious grounds to provide, amongst other learning opportunities, an equestrian academy, a primary-industry trades academy, and opportunities in the media and a wide range of sports activities-including but is not limited to Rugby, Netball, Cricket, Football and a wide array of others.

=== Houses ===
The houses of the college, their colours and eponyms are as follows:

- Clancy - Green - Brother Ferdinand Clancy, Christian Brothers Superior General (1950–1966)
- Magee - Red - Brother Felix Magee, the first Rector of the college in 1927
- Treacy - Blue - Brother Ambrose Treacy, Christian Brothers Leader and pioneer in Australia and New Zealand
- Whyte - Yellow - James White, Bishop of Dunedin in 1927

=== Sport ===
The college has produced seven All Blacks and one Silver Fern. Students participate in many sports including: hockey, rugby, basketball, soccer, netball, swimming, rowing, cricket, tennis, squash, badminton, skiing, snowboarding, multi-sport, athletics, tramping and kayaking. Swimming, athletic and cross-country sports are particularly emphasised and all students re heavily encouraged to participate. The college has its own golf course, Indoor athletics track, shooting range, polo field, swimming pool, turf and gymnasium.

St Kevins strongly participates in Rugby competitions. There is an annual game with Waitaki Boys' High School (located near Redcastle) for the Leo O’Malley Memorial Trophy ("the peanut"). This attracts up to 5000 spectators in anticipation of a tight match. As at 2014, Waitaki was the more frequent winner hoisting the trophy on 53 occasions to St Kevin's 21 wins with 5 draws. This rivalry is often referred to as "the blooder" by St Kevin's students, originating from St Kevin's students calling Waitaki Boys blood nuts because of the colour of their blazers. The St Kevin's blazers are blue.

=== Media and performance ===
The college emphasises public speaking, singing, drama, debating, choirs, dance, reading aloud, role plays and scripture reading. Cultural activities, such as the annual choral festival and annual production, are timetabled into the school year so that all students are involved to some degree. The college participates in the annual Bishop's Shield Competition which it has won several times. Debating is also encouraged. Many students learn music and learn to play musical instruments within the school day. The college has music ensembles and some students play in groups and orchestras outside the college. There is a Chapel Choir for College liturgical events.

=== Boarding hostel ===
St Kevin's College was established as a boys boarding school. When St Kevin's amalgamated with St Thomas's, the college took over the running of the St Thomas's boarding hostel which had been established after the closure of Teschemakers in 1979. The St Thomas's Hostel Trust was formed and it provided accommodation for girls in Balmoral St, Oamaru until 1984 when the hostel moved onto the St Kevin's College campus where the St Kevin's College junior school, called St John's school, had been. In 2019, a million-dollar upgrade of the five-building hostel block was commenced with the aim of attracting more boarding student enrolments. The improvements were funded by the Christian Brothers.

== Rectors ==
- 1927–1933: Brother B. F. Magee
- 1933–1936: Brother M. M. O'Connor
- 1936–1938: Brother J. B. Gettons
- 1939–1945: Brother M. D. McCarthy BA
- 1945–1951: Brother P. C. Ryan BA
- 1951–1952: Brother J. A. Morris
- 1953–1957: Brother J. I. Carroll BA, MusB
- 1958–1961: Brother J. B. Duffy BA, BEd (Hons)
- 1961–1967: Brother P. A. McManus BA, DipEd
- 1968–1971: Brother J. M. Hessian BSc, MACE
- 1972–1974: Brother P. A. Boyd
- 1975–1979: Brother M. B. Scanlan BSc, DipEd
- 1980–1996: Brother B. J. Lauren BA, TTC, DipEd, DipCat, DipRE
- 1996–2001: Mr J. G. Boyle BA, DipTch
- 2002–2010: Mr C. B. Russell BA, DipEd, DipTch
- 2010–2021: Mr P. R. Olsen BSc, DipTch
- 2022–present: Ms Jo Walshe BA, Dip Tch, Grad Dip (Theo), Grad Dip (RelSt)

== Dominican Sisters' Oamaru schools ==
The Dominican Sisters operated primary and secondary schools in Oamaru. Many of the pupils of these schools were the sisters, brother's or other relatives of St Kevin's College boys. St Kevin's College amalgamated with St Thomas's Girls' Secondary School and so was a co-educational school when the college became a state integrated form 1-7 school in 1983. Dominican sisters joined the St Kevin's staff. St Kevin's College thus became the "Heritage school" for Catholic secondary education in North Otago. "In essence, our histories merged, the Dominican and Christian Brothers' values united, and educational opportunities were enhanced for students." In 2025 there are two Catholic schools in Oamaru, a primary school St Joseph's School, Oamaru (also a Dominican school) and St Kevin's College.

=== St Joseph's School ===
This is the only Catholic Primary School in Oamaru. It was founded by the Dominican Sisters in 1882 as their first and continuing educational initiative in Oamaru. St Joseph's School will be shifted from its present site opposite St Patrick's Basilica to the St Kevin's College campus.

=== St Thomas's Girls' Secondary School (1935-1983) ===
In 1935 St Thomas's Girls' Secondary School commenced with nine girls enrolled. In 1952 the roll numbers had reached 71 and new buildings were opened on the site. In 1966 a library building was completed In 1977, St Patricks Dominican College, Teschemakers closed and many of its students moved to St Thomas's in 1978. St Thomas's began sharing some senior classes with St Kevins College in 1980. In 1983, St Thomas's Girls Secondary School closed and St Kevin's College became a coeducational school after 56 years as a single sex boys' school. The perspective of one of the "1983 girls" from St Thomas's who joined St Kevin's (SKC) was: "We came from a tiny girls' Catholic school behind the Oamaru Basilica and convent with 92 girls from form 3-7, there were several teaching nuns. SKC was a much bigger school with a strong culture, high standards, and a wider curriculum. It offered so many more sports and of course, the boys were pretty interesting and good fun. Our class size went from 26 to 32, 6 girls and 26 boys."

St Thomas's Girls' Secondary School was accommodated in the Rosary Convent and adjacent buildings. This large building, designed by the prominent Dunedin architect, F. W. Petre was completed in 1901. Part of the convent was designed to be used as a boarding school. It was composed of Oamaru stone and with concrete foundations. The Chapel of the Sacred Heart was opened in 1920 and this was used by St Thomas's during all the time that the school existed. Rosary Convent still exists as a very prominent building in Oamaru. It is located very close to St Patrick's Basilica another Petre building. The convent has been used as a residence for the elderly and now has other uses.

=== St Patrick's Dominican College, Teschemakers (1912-1977) ===
Another Dominican school for girls had closed in 1977 but its memory is also part of the tradition of St Kevin's College. St Patrick's College, a secondary boarding school for girls operated by the Dominican Sisters, existed at Teschemakers, 10 kilometres south of Oamaru, for 65 years from 1912 to 1977. The school was associated with the McCarthy family of North Otago which donated the property, and it opened with seven Dominican sisters and seven boarders. In its early years the school tried to be self-supporting and the student day commenced with 4am cow-milking. There was no running water. it had to be pumped by hand, and there was no electricity, only oil lamps and candles. The college's fine buildings were erected and the beautiful and tranquil surroundings impacted on and shaped the lives of the pupils and teachers.

The Gothic revival chapel of the Holy Rosary was commissioned in 1912 and paid for by the generosity of a local benefactor from Oamaru, Frances Grant. It was also designed by F. W. Petre and completed in 1916. The frequent liturgical events in the chapel were an abiding and influential memory for the students.

Teschemakers, once home to 140 boarding girls, was closed as a school, mainly because there weren't enough sisters to teach and manage it. Many of the students transferred to St Thomas's Girls Secondary School. In 1980, the campus became a conference and retreat centre until the Dominicans sold it in 2000. After the sale, there was controversy over the future of the Gothic Revival-style Carrara marble altar with its alabaster depiction of The Last Supper. The Dominicans had given the altar to a church in Dunedin. However a ruling by the Environment Court meant that the altar remained. The chapel is open to the public daily. It is used as a wedding venue and the convent buildings are a boutique hotel. In 2025 there was still a Dominican presence at Teschemakers.

=== St Thomas's Academy (1912-1962) ===
The Dominican sisters also conducted St Thomas's Academy, a full primary (ages 5 years to 12 years) boarding school for boys. It was established in 1913. The school was accommodated in Rosary Convent. The school began with one pupil, but there were 24 pupils by the end of the second year. In 1920 there were 64 boys in residence. In the 1920s the school attained considerable academic success with pupils winning many scholarships to reputable secondary school (including St Kevin's College) and junior national scholarships. The fine chapel of the Rosary Convent (the Chapel of the Sacred Heart) was used by the boys of the academy as well as, from 1935, by the girls of St Thomas's Girls' Secondary School. St Thomas's Academy closed in 1961. Numbers of pupils had declined considerably and the Dominican sisters could not provide staff for such a small group. In 1961 a primary school was set up for the Year 7 and 8 boys from St Kevin's College. This was situated on the lower part of the driveway of the college and called St John's School. This school closed down in 1983 when St Joseph's school became a full state integrated primary school and there were no more junior classes at St Kevin's College.

== Notable alumni ==
St Kevin's College honours not only its own notable ex-students but also those now-closed Dominican Oamaru schools, St Patrick's Dominican College Teschemakers, St Thomas's Academy, and St Thomas's Girls' Secondary School.

- Miles Anderson – politician; National Party Member of Parliament for Waitaki (2023–present)
- Bridget Armstrong – actress (St Patrick's Dominican College, Teschemakers)
- Maree Bowden – a New Zealand netball international.
- Leonard Anthony Boyle (1930–2016) – fifth Bishop of Dunedin (1983–2005)
- Kevin Brady CNZM (born 1947) – the 17th Controller and Auditor-General of New Zealand 2002–2009
- Dan Buckingham – Olympic Paralympian athlete
- Donald John Cameron (born Dunedin 20 February 1933) – journalist and sportswriter.
- Thomas Desmond Coughlan – All Blacks flanker, 1958
- Jacqueline Fahey – artist (St Patrick's Dominican College, Teschemakers)
- James Esmond Farrell (1909 – 1968) – diplomat. (St Thomas's Academy)
- Peter Gresham (1933 - 2024) – National Party Member of Parliament for Waitotara (1990–1996), List MP (1996–1999); Minister of Social Welfare and Minister of Senior Citizens (1996–1999)
- Gavan Herlihy – National Party Member of Parliament for Otago (1996–2002)
- Sister Patricia Mary Hook DCNZM (1921 – 2010) – Sister of Mercy, nurse and hospital administrator (St Thomas's Girls' Secondary School).
- James Charles Kearney – All Blacks first five-eighth, 1947–1949
- Kevin Francis Laidlaw – All Blacks centre three-quarter, 1960
- Francis Steven McAtamney – All Blacks prop, 1956
- William Alexander McCaw – All Blacks Captain 1954, Number 8 and flanker, 1951–1954
- John McKinnon – ophthalmologist; mountaineer; and the first volunteer doctor at Kunde Hospital
- Denzil Meuli (Pierre Denzil) (1926–2019) – priest of the Diocese of Auckland, writer, former editor of the Zealandia and a leading New Zealand traditionalist Catholic
- Sione Misiloi (born 1994) – rugby union player for the Highlanders in Super Rugby as flanker.
- Alec Neill – National Party Member of Parliament for Waitaki (1990–1996), List MP (1999, 2001 and 2002)
- Melanie Nolan FASSA (born 1960) - historian specialising in labour and gender history (St Patrick's Dominican College, Teschemakers)
- Bernard O'Brien SJ (1907 – 1982) - Jesuit priest, philosopher, musician (cellist), writer and seminary professor (St Thomas's Academy).
- Tim O'Malley (born 1994) – rugby union player for Tasman in the Bunnings NPC
- Brad Poulter (aka Brad Harris) (born 1982), writer, veteran and culture leader; pioneering openly gay member of the Royal New Zealand Navy.
- Bronson Ross (born 1985) - professional Rugby Player.
- Craig Smith (born 1985) – first-class cricketer for Otago (2004–05 and 2015–16).
- Matt Saunders – rugby union player
- Cyril Laurence (Larry) Siegert (1923–2007), CB, CBE, MVO, DFC, AFC, Air Vice Marshal – Chief of Air Force (New Zealand) (1976 to 1979)
- Kevin Lawrence Skinner – All Blacks captain 1952; prop, 1949–1956; champion heavy weight boxer
- Robert Charles Stuart – All Blacks captain, loose forward 1949–1954; rugby coach, and WW2 naval commander
- Tom Taylor (1925–1994) – sculptor, architect; Head of Sculpture at the University of Canterbury.
- Owen Tracey DFC (1915–1941) – fighter pilot and flying ace; flew in the Royal Air Force (RAF) during the Second World War.
- Jane Watson (born 1990) – New Zealand netball international
- Gordon Whiting (1942–2018) – judge
- Thomas Williams ONZ ChStJ (1930–2023) – cardinal, Archbishop Emeritus of Wellington.
- Dominik Yanzick (born 1993) - Labour Party Member of Parliament for the Wigram electorate (2026 - present).

The college has produced 19 Christian Brothers and 7 Brothers belonging to other Religious Orders, 101 Priests, 1 Bishop, 1 Archbishop (who was also a cardinal). In sport, 2 Silver Ferns and 7 All Blacks (including 3 captains) have been students at St Kevin's.

== See also ==
- St Joseph's School, Oamaru
- St Patrick's Basilica, Oamaru
- Congregation of Christian Brothers in New Zealand
- Roman Catholic Diocese of Dunedin

== Sources ==
- Redcastle Recollections, A Golden Jubilee Volume, St Kevin's College, Oamaru, 1977.
- Graeme Donaldson, To All Parts of the Kingdom: Christian Brothers In New Zealand 1876–2001, Christian Brothers New Zealand Province, Christchurch, 2001.
- Sister Mary Augustine McCarthy O.P., Star In The South: The Centennial History of the New Zealand Dominican Sisters, St Dominic's Priory Dunedin, 1970.
- J.C. O'Neill, The History of the Work of the Christian Brothers in New Zealand, unpublished Dip. Ed. thesis, University of Auckland, 1968.
- Robert Pinney, Early Northern Otago Runs, Collins, Auckland, 1981.
- Paul Malcolm Robertson, Nga Parata Karaitiana The Christian Brothers, A Public Culture in Transition, A Comparative Study of the Indian and New Zealand Provinces, an unpublished thesis for MA in anthropology, University of Auckland, 1996.
- St Kevin's College website (Retrieved 2 September 2014)
