= Steampunk HQ =

Art collaboration in Oamaru, New Zealand

Coordinates: 45°6′8.5″S 170°58′14.5″E

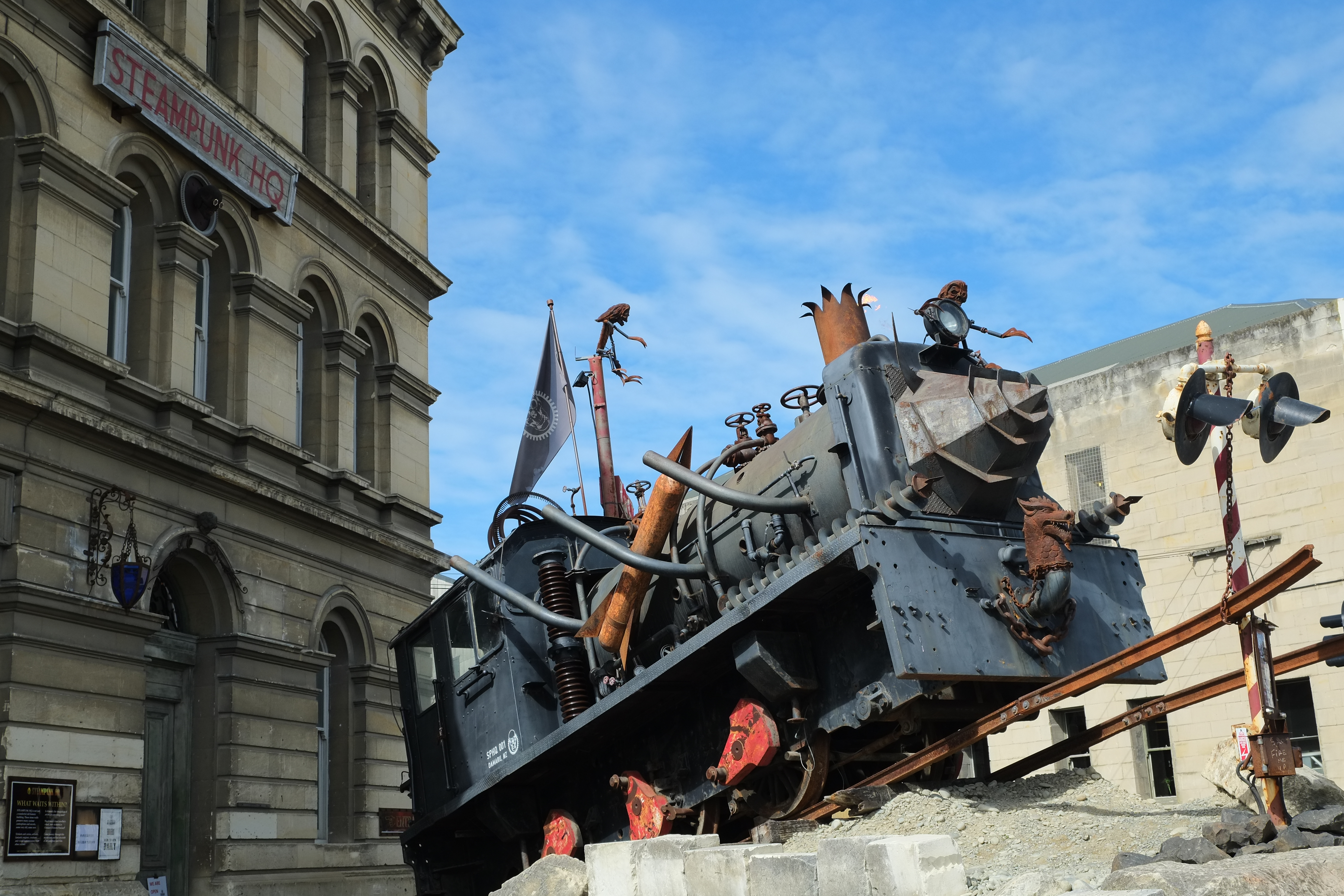
Steampunk engine in front of Steampunk HQ

Steampunk HQ is an art collaboration and gallery in the historic Victorian precinct of Oamaru, New Zealand. Opened in November 2011, it celebrates its own industrial take on steampunk via an array of contraptions and sculptures, complemented by audiovisual installations. A yard also contains a collection of other industrial parts and projects in various stages of completion.

Steampunk HQ is located in the former Meeks Grain Elevator Building, a historic building registered with by the New Zealand Historic Places Trust as a Category I structure.

Outside of the free-standing stone building, a coin-operated "steampunk" railway engine greets visitors. This NZR DS class diesel locomotive has been heavily modified with lights, engine, and train whistle noises, and fire breathing out of its chimney. The building's exterior walls are decorated with creations such as giant flies made from metal and industrial parts.

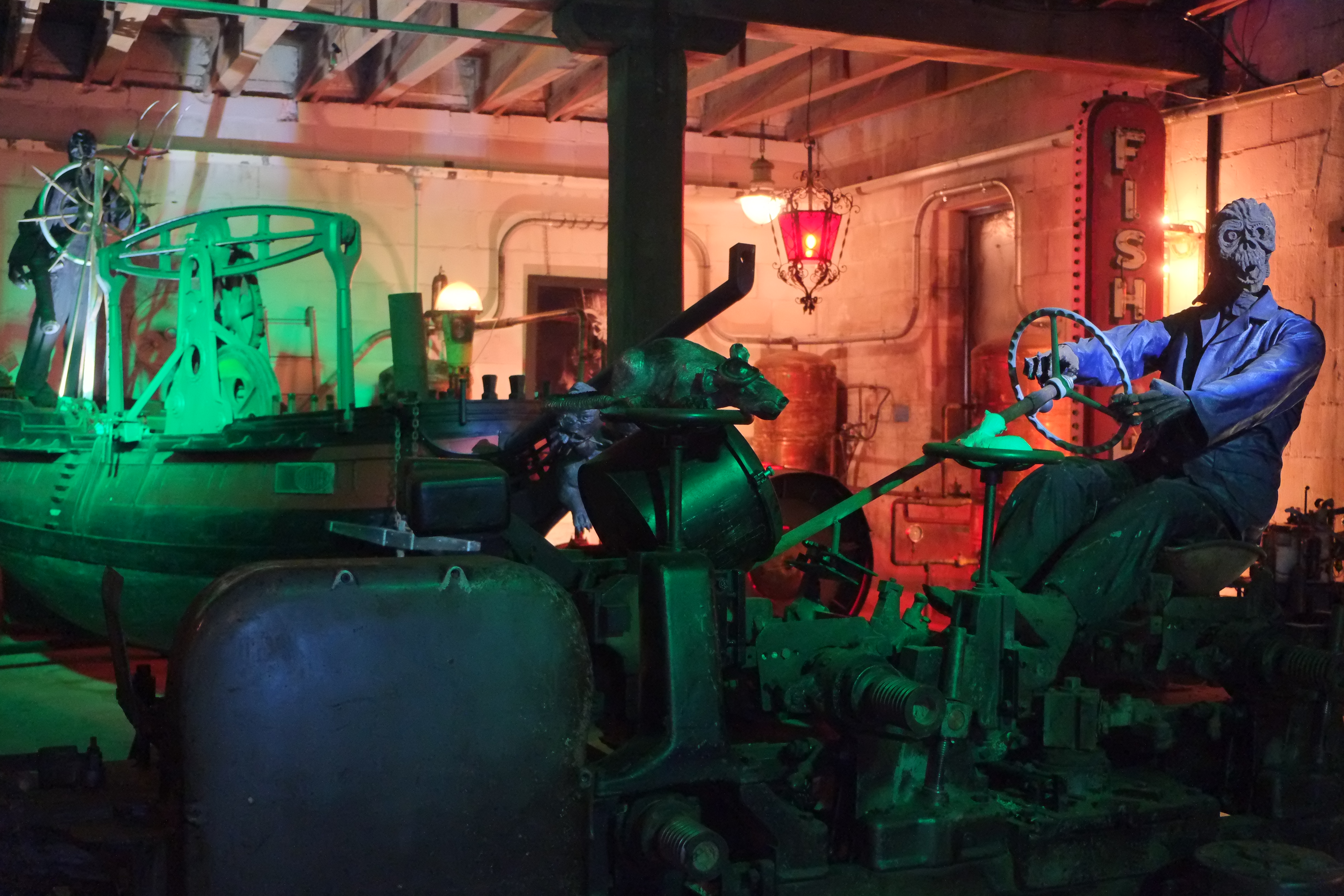
Steampunk vehicles on display inside Steampunk HQ

Inside, the gallery presents a theme of a dark post-apocalyptic vision of a future "as it might have been". Contraptions and machinery featuring heavy use of copper, gears, pipes, gas cylinders, as well as an ensemble of skeletal sculptures are lit by flickering lights and accompanied by projectors and background sounds. Two large darkened rooms and part of the building's basement house a variety of old industrial and medical machines remade into "aetheric" devices. The exhibits include some large machines, such as a steam tractor, periodically emitting steam, and a boat with a grim reaper.

A back door from the gallery leads to a yard containing further large machines in various stages of being "steampunked", for example a train carriage being converted to a fortified steam engine and an "Aethertractor", as well as a variety of junk waiting to become parts of yet more contraptions.

In 2012, Steampunk HQ was rated as one of New Zealand's best new tourist attractions. The annual Steampunk NZ Festival is held every Queen's Birthday Weekend in early June, with three days of activities, including a fashion show and ball. The Libratory art gallery next door in the Woolstore displays and sells steampunk artwork and sculptures.
