= Frank McAtamney =

New Zealand rugby union player (1934–2022)

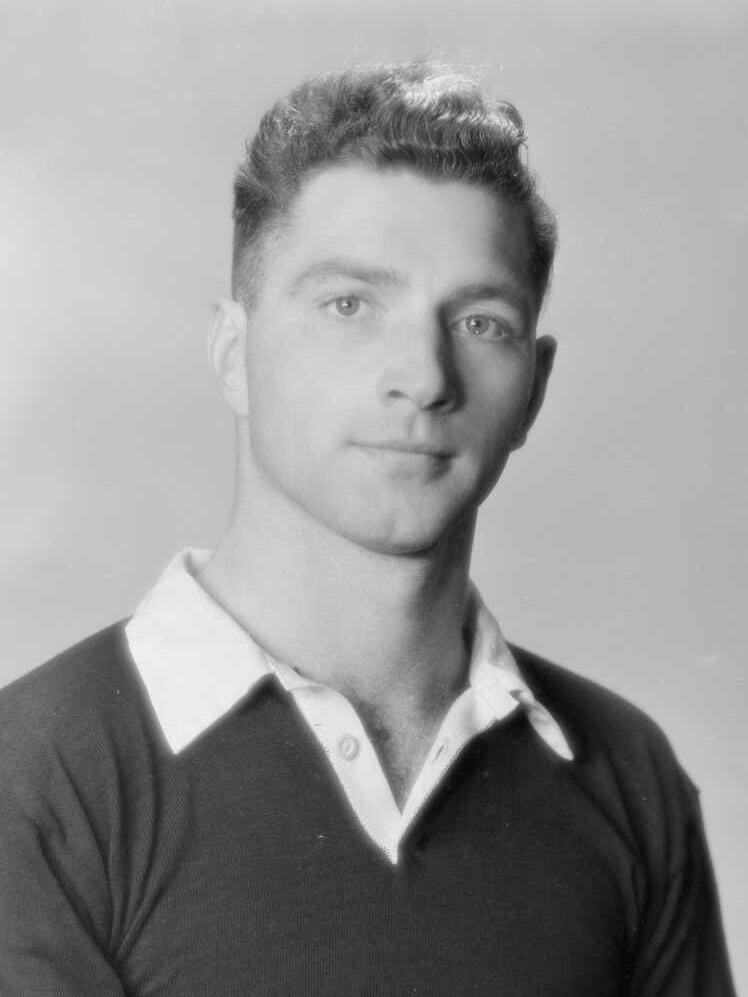
- McAtamney in 1955
- Born: Francis Stevens McAtamney; 15 May 1934 Middlemarch, New Zealand
- Died: 6 February 2022 (aged 87) Geraldine, New Zealand
- Height: 1.80 m (5 ft 11 in)
- Weight: 93 kg (205 lb)
- School: St Kevin's College
- Notable relative: Sam Johnson (grandson)
- Occupation: Farmer

Rugby union career
- Position: Prop
Amateur team(s)
| Years | Team | Apps | (Points) |
- Strath Taieri
Provincial / State sides
| Years | Team | Apps | (Points) |
| 1954–57 | Otago | 38 | |
International career
| Years | Team | Apps | (Points) |
| 1956–57 | New Zealand | 1 | (0) |

Francis Stevens McAtamney (15 May 1934 – 6 February 2022) was a New Zealand rugby union player. He was a member of the New Zealand national side, the All Blacks, in 1956 and 1957, playing in the prop position.

== Early life ==
McAtamney was born in Middlemarch, New Zealand, and educated at St. Kevin's College, Oamaru where he played rugby for the school.

== Senior rugby ==
McAtamney played for the Strath Taieri club and represented Otago (in the playing position of lock) from 1954 until 1957. He played for the South Island team in 1956 and was a New Zealand trialist in 1956 and 1957. He played in a New Zealand XV in 1955.

== All Black ==
McAtamney had played for Otago as a lock but he was selected for the All Blacks in 1956 as a prop. He played against the Springboks in their 1956 tour and he was selected again in 1957 for the tour of Australia that year. In all he played nine matches for the All Blacks, including one international.

== Death ==
McAtamney died on 6 February 2022, at the age of 87.
