= Oamaru stone =

Limestone quarried at New Zealand

Oamaru stone is used on many of Otago's older structures, like this bridge arch in Oamaru.

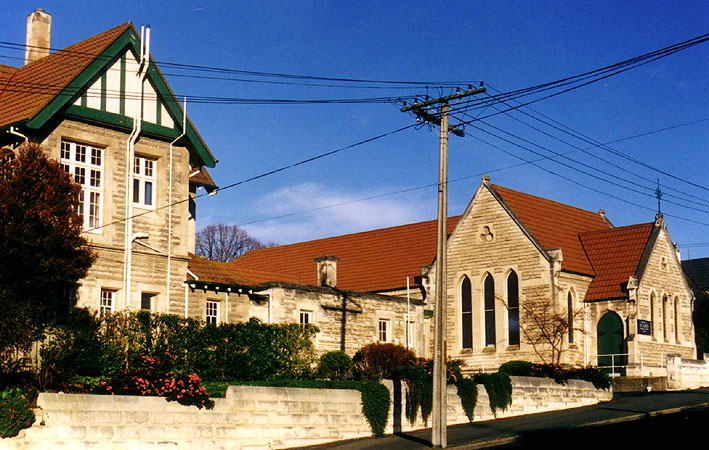
Houses in Oamaru using Oamaru stone.

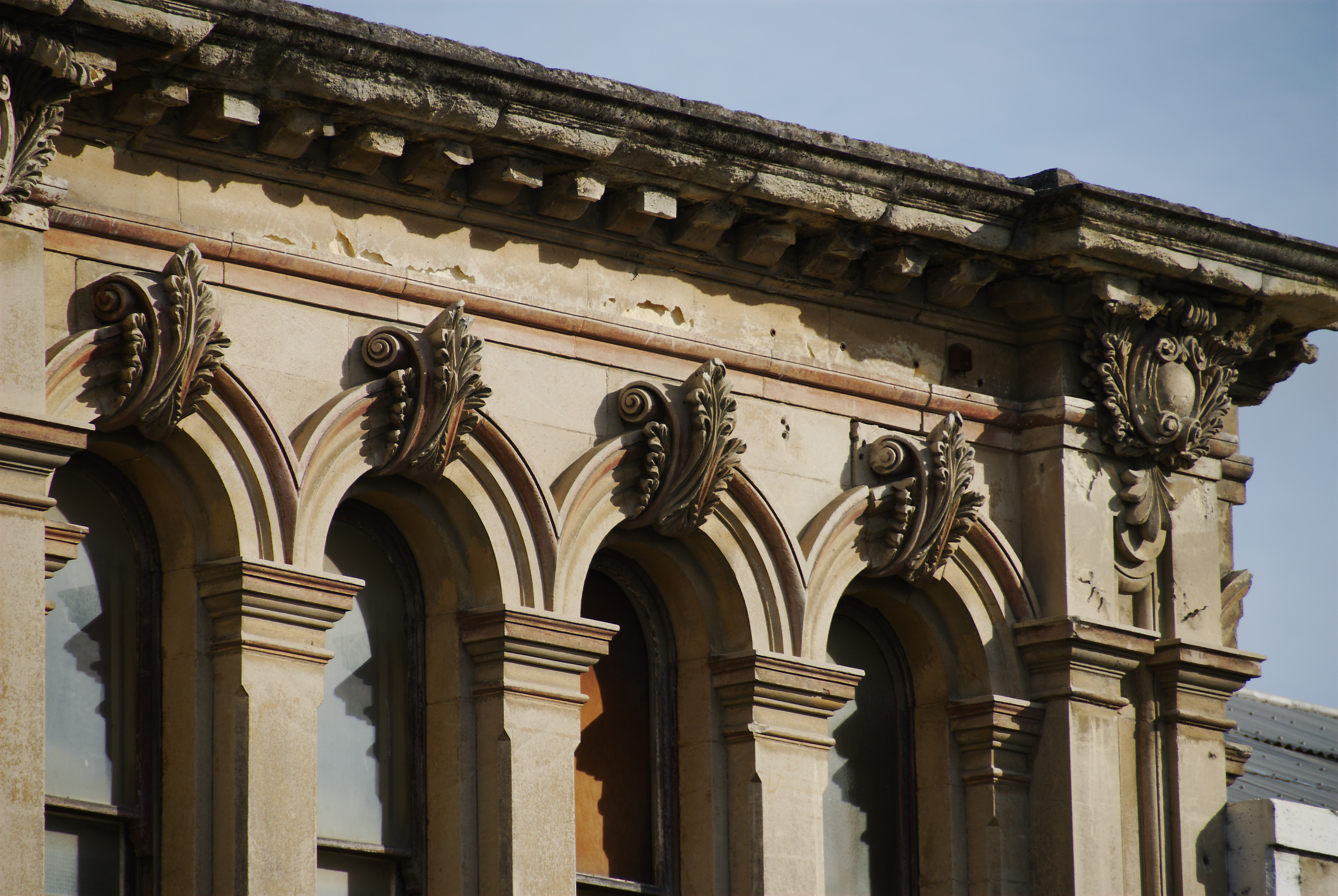
Weathered cornice and decorated keystones in the harbour area of Oamaru.

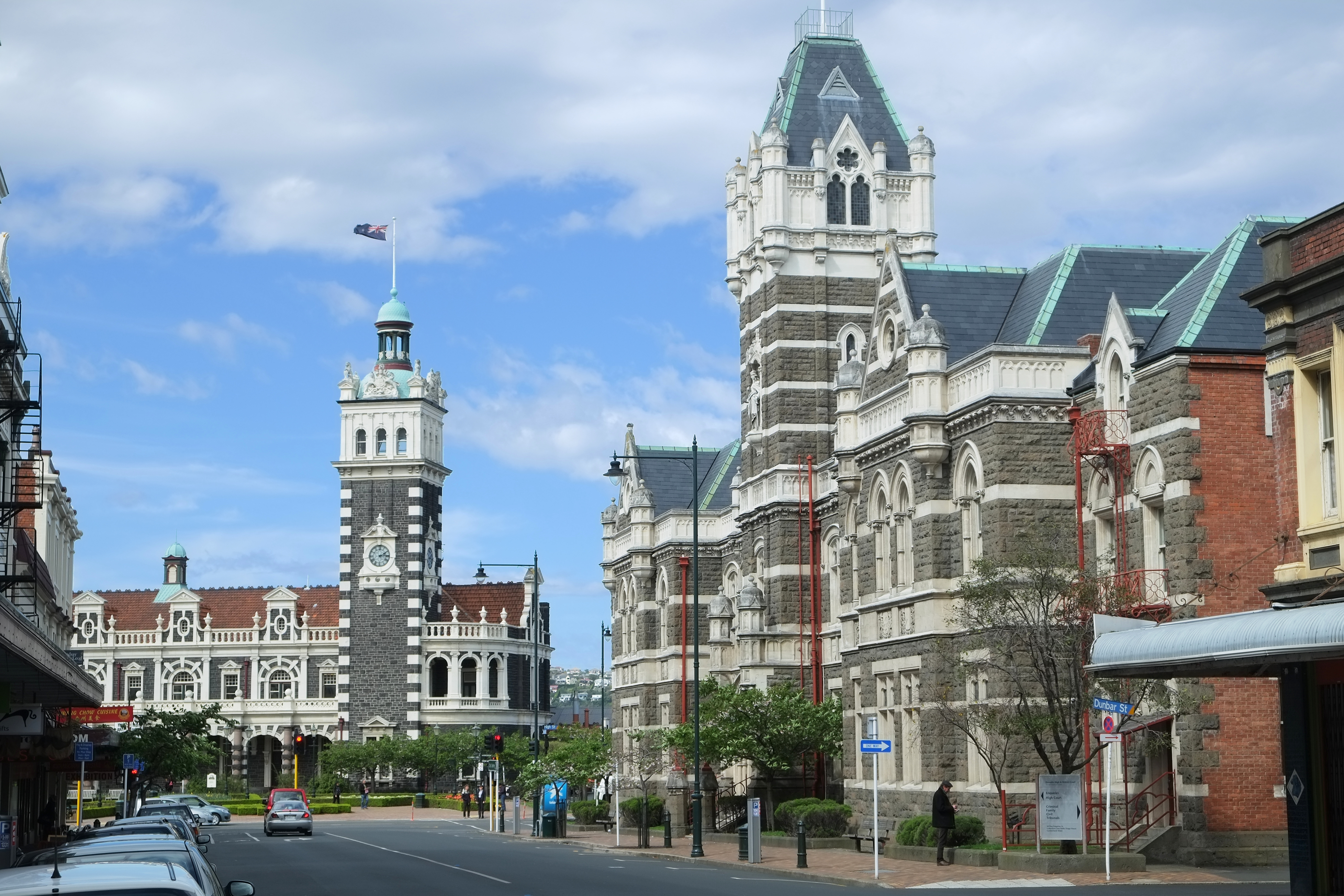
The distinctive combination of dark basalt and Oamaru stone is seen in buildings such as Dunedin Railway Station (centre left) and Law Courts (right).

Oamaru stone, sometimes called whitestone, is a hard, compact limestone, quarried at Weston, near Oamaru in Otago, New Zealand.

Oamaru stone was used on many of the grand public buildings in the towns and cities of the southern South Island, especially after the financial boom caused by the Otago gold rush of the 1860s. Initially used primarily in Oamaru itself, it became popular in Dunedin in around 1866, with the University of Otago's Registry Building being the first major structure in the city to make use of it.

The city of Dunedin and town of Oamaru both have many fine examples of Oamaru stone edifices, such as St Patrick's Basilica. The stone was used widely on buildings in many parts of New Zealand, including in the construction of both the Town Hall and the Chief Post Office in Auckland.

The stone has been prominently used in combination with the more hard-wearing bluestone basalt found in many parts of the southern South Island, creating a distinctive style of dark grey basalt walls with lighter Oamaru stone facings. Notable buildings to use this combination include the Dunedin Railway Station, Otago University Registry Building, Dunedin Law Courts, and Christchurch Arts Centre. In Oamaru itself the stone is most commonly found as the primary construction material, with many of the town's more notable buildings (such as the Waitaki District Council building) showing its distinctive creamy colour.

Its ease of working also appeals to sculptors and examples of Oamaru stone sculpture can be found throughout New Zealand.

== Chemistry ==
The source of the stone is a 40-metre thick deposit inland from Oamaru consisting of bryozoan limestone. Oamaru stone is limestone with a uniform granular creamy white consistency and colour. Predominantly (90%) calcium carbonate, trace chemicals within it include alumina (1.5%), iron oxide (0.5%) and silica (0.5%). Its chemistry makes it similar to the Ketton stone oolite of southern England and France's Caen stone, though it is considerably lighter in weight at 1.68 tonnes per cubic metre when freshly quarried, and 1.47 tonnes per cubic metre when completely dry.

The stone is porous, making it susceptible to weathering in damp conditions, but sturdy in a moderate to dry climate. It is soft when first quarried, hardening on exposure to air. This, along with its uniform texture, makes it excellent for sculptural and ornamental purposes. The finished stonework has a creamy, sandy colour. It is not strongly resistant to pollution, and can be prone to surface crumbling, but is excellent as a material for internal architectural ornamentation. It is also greatly used for free-standing carvings and sculptures.

== See also ==
- List of types of limestone
