= Oamaru =

Oamaru Ōamaru, Te Oha-a-Maru (Māori)
- Town
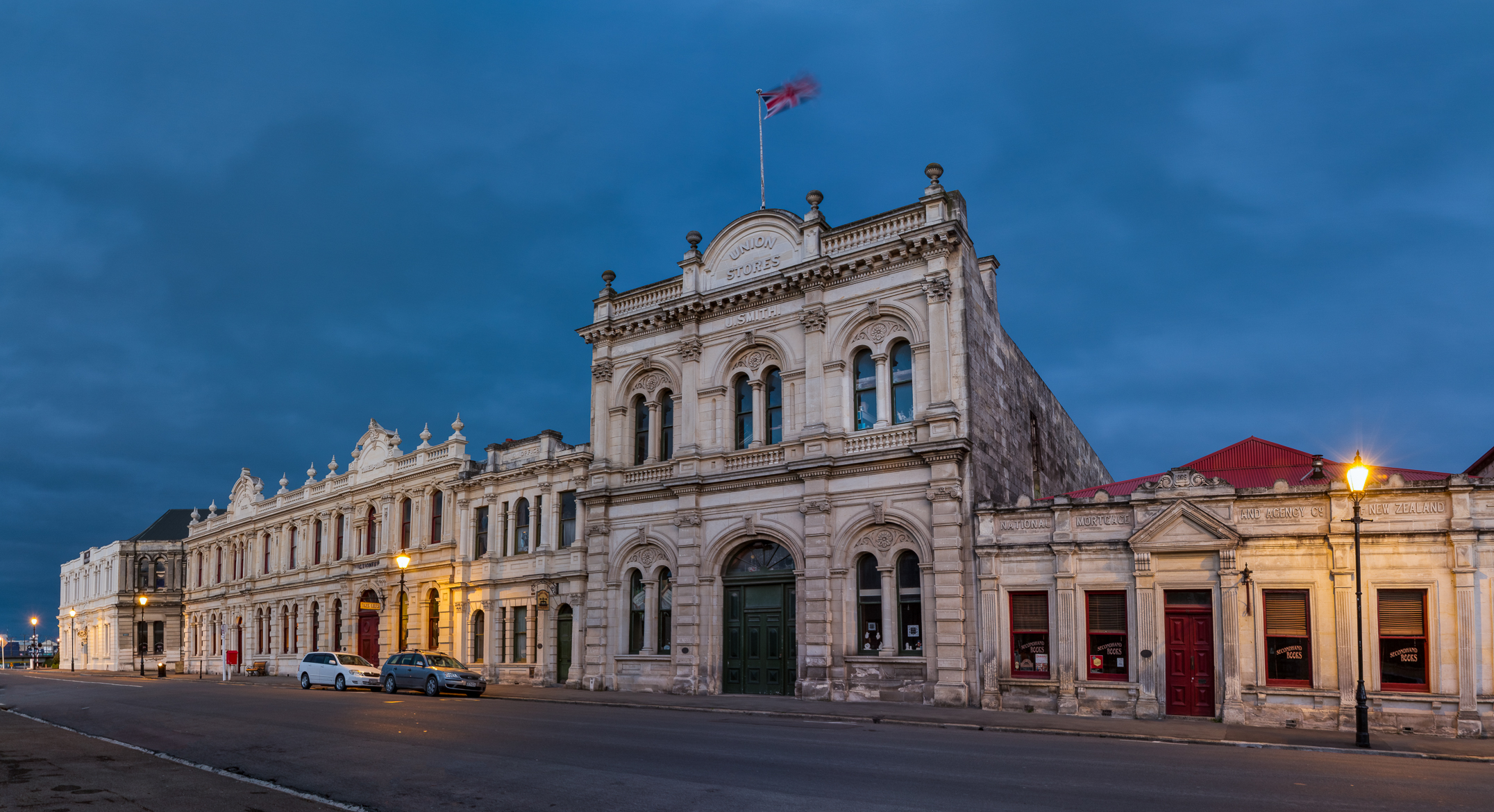
- Oamaru's historic section of Tyne Street
- Interactive map of Oamaru
- Coordinates: 45.098°S 170.971°E
- Country: New Zealand
- Region: Otago
- Territorial authority: Waitaki District
- Ward: Oamaru Ward
- Electorates: Waitaki; Te Tai Tonga (Māori)

Government
  - Territorial authority: Waitaki District Council
  - Regional council: Otago Regional Council
  - Mayor of Waitaki: Melanie Tavendale
  - Waitaki MP: Miles Anderson
  - Te Tai Tonga MP: Mananui Ramsden

Area
  - Total: 20.21 km^{2} (7.80 sq mi)

Population (June 2025)
  - Total: 14,300
  - Density: 708/km^{2} (1,830/sq mi)
- Demonym: Oamaruvian
- Time zone: UTC+12 (NZST)
  - Summer (DST): UTC+13 (NZDT)
- Post code: 9400
- Area code: 03
- Local iwi: Ngāi Tahu

Oamaru, (Note: (/ˌɒməˈruː/; Māori: Oamaru [ɔa.ma.rʉ], Te Oha-a-Maru)) the largest town in North Otago, in the South Island of New Zealand, is the main town of the Waitaki District. It is 80 kilometres (50 mi) south of Timaru and 120 kilometres (75 mi) north of Dunedin on the Pacific coast; State Highway 1 and the railway Main South Line connect it to both cities. With a population of 14,300, Oamaru is the 28th largest urban area in New Zealand, and the third largest in Otago behind Dunedin and Queenstown. The town is the seat of Waitaki District, which includes the surrounding towns of Kurow, Weston, Palmerston, and Hampden, which combined have a population of 23,200.

Friendly Bay is a popular recreational area on the edge of Oamaru Harbour, south of Oamaru's main centre. Just to the north of Oamaru is the substantial Alliance abattoir at Pukeuri, at a major junction with State Highway 83, the main route into the Waitaki Valley. This highway provides a link to Kurow, Omarama, Otematata and via the Lindis Pass to Queenstown and Wānaka. Oamaru serves as the eastern gateway to the Mackenzie Basin, via the Waitaki Valley.

Oamaru is built between the rolling hills of limestone and short stretch of flat land to the sea. The limestone rock is used for the construction of local "Oamaru stone", sometimes called "whitestone", buildings.

Oamaru enjoys a protected location in the shelter of Cape Wanbrow. The town was laid out in 1858 by Otago's provincial surveyor John Turnbull Thomson, who named the early streets after British rivers, particularly rivers in the northwest and southeast of the country.

The name Oamaru derives from the Māori and can be translated as 'the place of Maru' (cf. Timaru). The identity of Maru remains open to conjecture.

== History ==
=== Māori settlement ===
There are some important archaeological sites around Oamaru. Those at the Waitaki River mouth and at Awamoa both date from the Archaic (moa-hunter) phase of Māori culture, when New Zealand's human population clustered along the south-east coast from about AD 1100. The Waitaki River mouth had at least 1,200 ovens. Awamoa saw the first archaeological excavation in New Zealand when W.B.D. Mantell dug there at Christmas 1847 and in 1852. Smaller Archaic sites exist at Cape Wanbrow and at Beach Road in central Oamaru. The distinctive Archaic art of the Waitaki Valley rock shelters dates from this period — some of it presumably made by the occupants of these sites. The area also features Classic and Protohistoric sites, from after about AD 1500, at Tamahaerewhenua, Tekorotuaheka, Te Punamaru, Papakaio, and Kakanui.

Māori tradition tells of the ancient people Kahui Tipua building a canoe, Āraiteuru, which sailed from southern New Zealand to the ancestral Polynesian homeland, Hawaiki, to obtain kūmara. On its return it became waterlogged off the Waitaki River mouth, lost food baskets at Moeraki beach and ended up wrecked at Matakaea (Shag Point) where it turned into Danger Reef. After the wreck a crew member, Pahihiwitahi, seeking water, discovered the Waitaki River, but on returning south and failing to reach the wreck before dawn he was turned into a hill in the Shag Valley. Modern academics have suggested this tale is an allegorical explanation of the fact that kūmara will not grow south of Banks Peninsula.

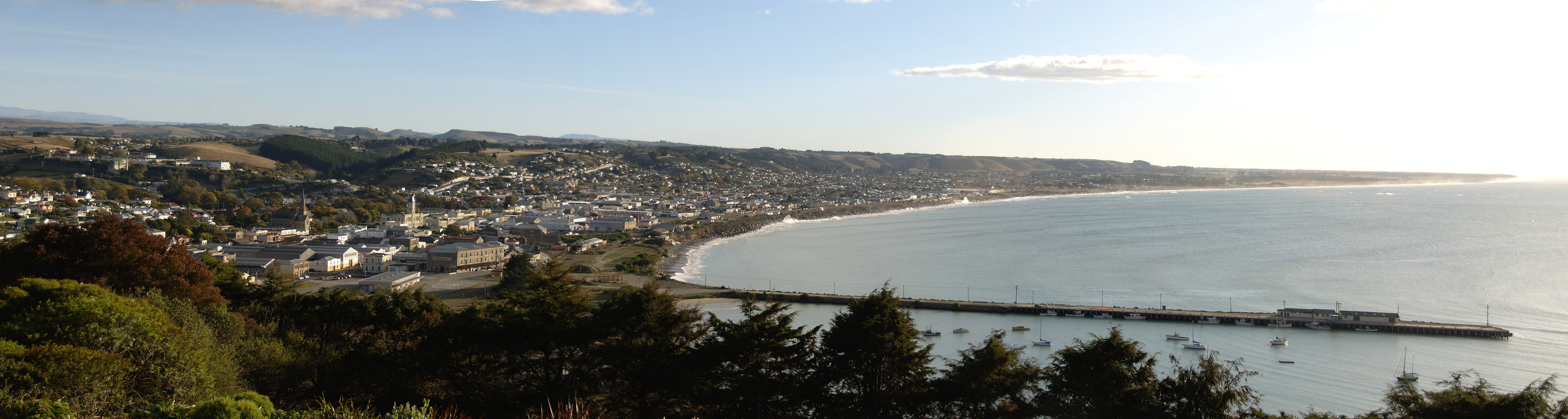
View of Oamaru and the coast to the north, from above the south end of the town

=== European contact ===
On 20 February 1770 James Cook in the Endeavour reached a position very close to the Waitaki mouth and "about 3 Miles [5 km] from the shore", according to his journal. He said the land "here is very low and flat and continues so up to the skirts of the Hills which are at least 4 or 5 Miles [6–8 km] in land. The whole face of the Country appears barren, nor did we see any signs of inhabitants." He stayed on this part of the coast four days. Sydney Parkinson, the expedition's artist, described what seems to be Cape Wanbrow, in Oamaru. On 20 February he wrote "...we were near the land, which formed an agreeable view to the naked eye. The hills were of a moderate height, having flats that extended from them a long way, bordered by a perpendicular rocky cliff next to the sea."

Māori did live in the area, and sealers visited the coast in 1814. The Creed manuscript, discovered in 2003, records:

Some of the [local] people [had been] absent on a feasting expedition to meet a great party from Taumutu, Akaroa, Orawenua [Arowhenua]. They were returning. The [sealers'] boat passed on to the Bluff 8 miles [13 km] north of Moeraki where they landed & arranged their boat – & lay down to sleep in their boat. At night Pukuheke, father of Te More, went to the boat, found them asleep & came back to the other Natives south of the Bluff. They went with 100 [men] killing 5 Europeans & eat them. Two of the seven escaped through the darkness of the night & fled as far as Goodwood, Bobby's Head, after being 2 days and nights on the way.

Pukuheke's party killed and ate these as well. The Pākehā, a party from the Matilda (Captain Fowler), under the first mate Robert Brown with two other Europeans and five lascars or Indian seamen, made eight in all, not seven as the manuscript says. They had been sent in an open boat from Stewart Island in search of a party of absconding lascars. Brown must have had some reason for searching for them on the North Otago coast.

After Te Rauparaha's sack of the large pā (fortified settlement) at Kaiapoi near modern Christchurch in 1831, refugees came south and gained permission to settle at Kakaunui (Kakanui), and the territory between Pukeuri and Waianakarua, including the site of urban Oamaru, became their domain.

=== Nineteenth century onwards ===
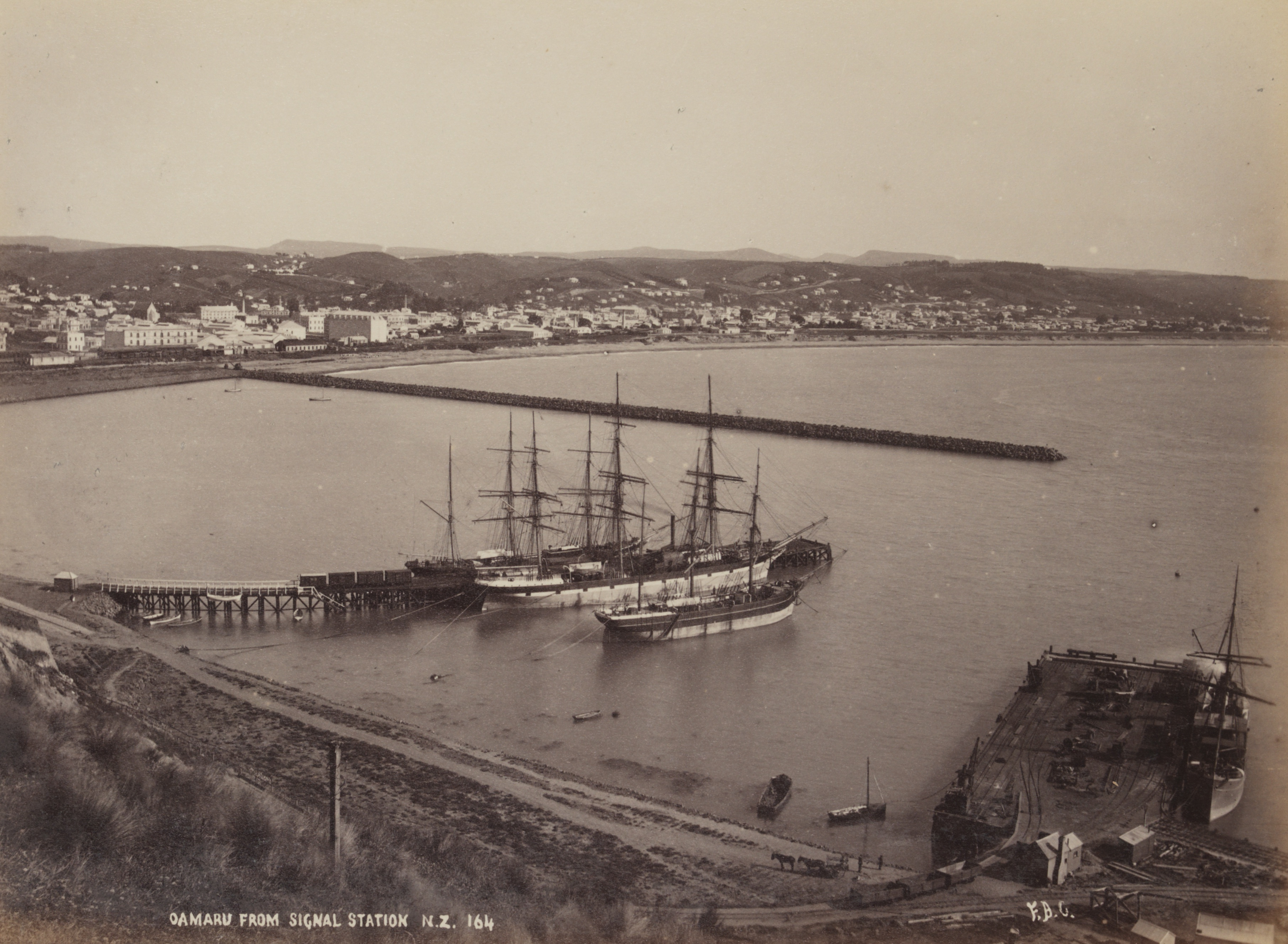
Oamaru from Signal Station, New Zealand, c. 1895

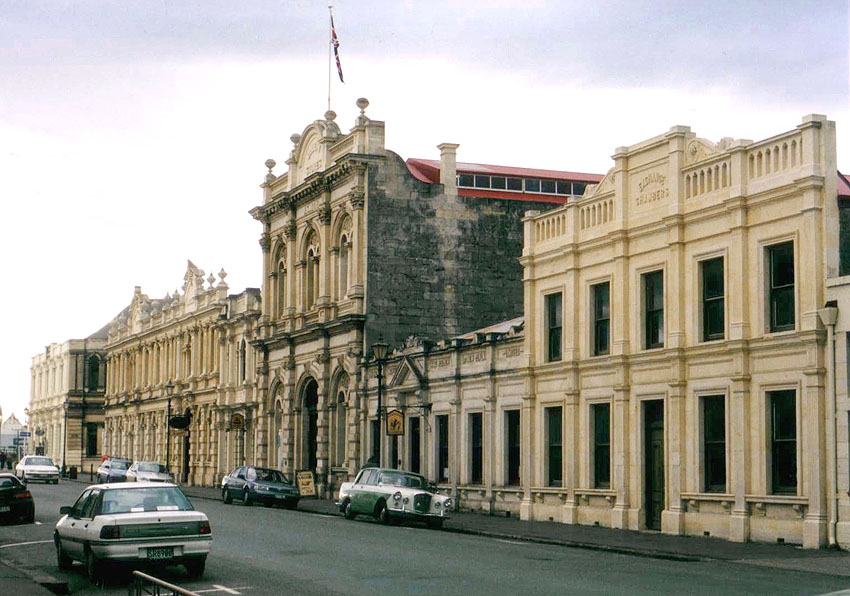
Part of Oamaru's historic district

Whalers sometimes visited this part of the coast in the 1830s. The Jason, for example, probably of New London in the United States, Captain Chester, was reported at "Otago Bluff" south of Kakanui, with 2,500 barrels (400 m^{3}) of oil, on 1 December 1839.

Edward Shortland visited the area in 1844, coming overland from Waikouaiti. On 9 January he recorded "Our path to-day was sometimes along the edge of a low cliff, sometimes along the beach, till we approached Oamaru point, where it turned inland, and crossed a low range of hills, from which we looked over an extensive plain … Towards the afternoon, we ascended a range of hills called Pukeuri, separating this plain from another more extensive. The sky was so remarkably clear that, from the highest point of the pathway, Moeraki was distinctly in view..." He made a map and placed Oamaru on it. He was one of several Europeans who passed through the area on foot in the 1840s. James Saunders became the first European resident of the district some time before 1850 when he settled to trade among the Māori of the Waitaki River mouth.

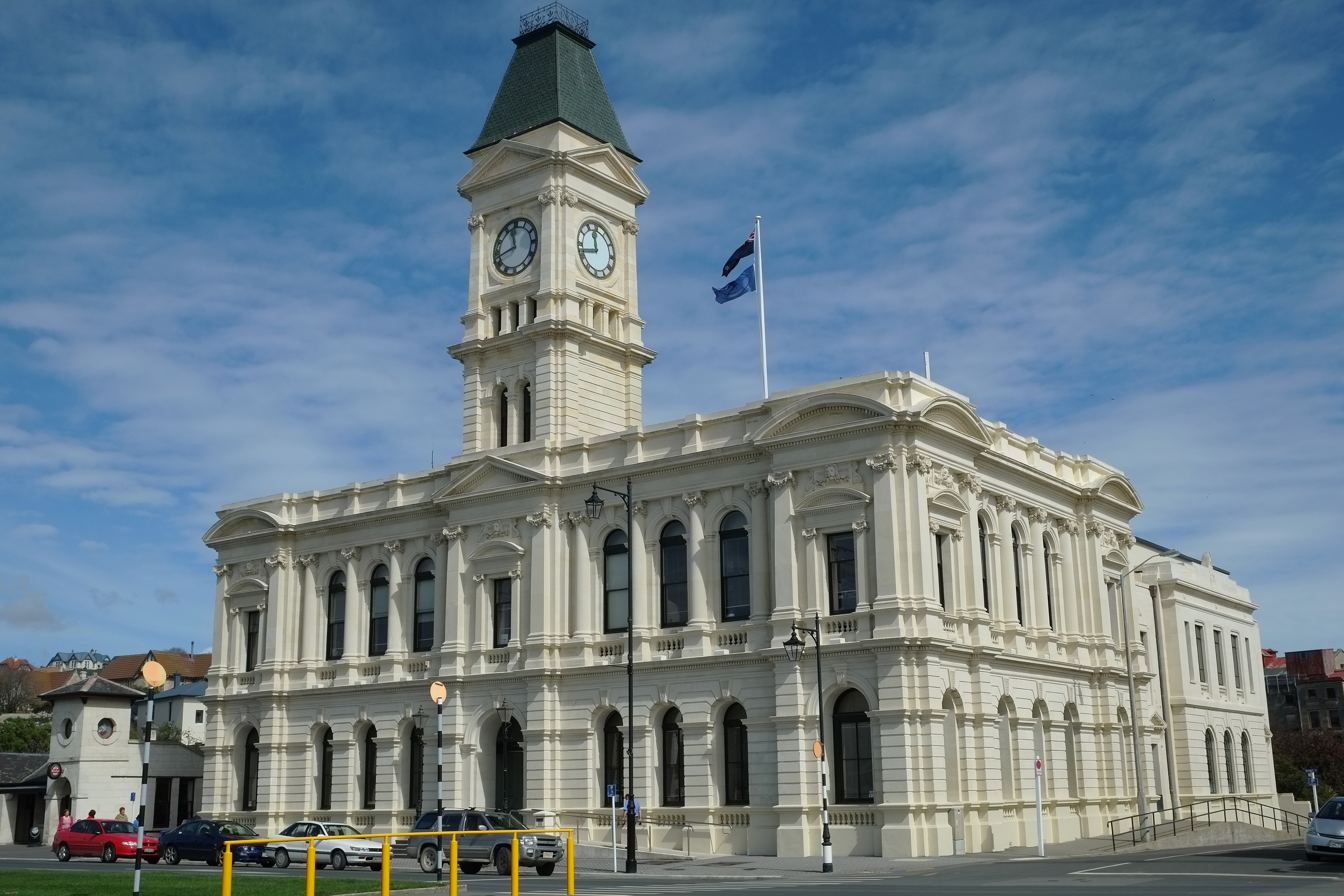
Waitaki District Council building, Thames Street, Oamaru. Formerly the Oamaru Chief Post Office

More European settlers arrived in the Oamaru area in the 1850s. Hugh Robison built and lived in a sod hut by Oamaru Creek in 1853 while establishing his sheep run. J.T. Thomson surveyed the place as a town in 1859, and the Otago Provincial government declared "hundreds" there on 30 November 1860. The town grew as a service-centre for the agricultural/pastoral hinterland between the Kakanui Mountains and the Waitaki River, and rapidly became a major port. A boost was given by public works, including harbour development, and an export trade in wool and grain from the 1860s. Following the loss of a number of vessels off the coast, engineer John McGregor designed a breakwater, which was constructed by Walkem and Peyman between April 1871 and December 1884. The building of this breakwater was influential in the development of new forms of crane.

For many years there was a commercial and fishing harbour under Cape Wanbrow at Friendly Bay. With the development of pastoralism and the associated frozen-meat industry having its historical origins in New Zealand just south of the town at Totara, Oamaru flourished. Institutions such as the Athenaeum, Chief Post Office and Waitaki Boys' and Waitaki Girls' High Schools sprang up. The locally plentiful limestone (Oamaru stone) lent itself to carving and good designers, such as John Lemon (1828–1890), Thomas Forrester (1838–1907) and his son J.M. Forrester (1865–1965), and craftsmen utilised it. By the time of the depression of the 1880s Oamaru was home to an impressive array of buildings and the "best built and most mortgaged town in Australasia".

In 1872 Oamaru Hospital, known as "the hospital on the hill", opened. A new children's ward the Saltzman Children's Ward, opened in 1937 and further wards were added between the 1950s and 1980s. A new hospital building opened in 2000 and the old building demolished in 2016.

A major factor in the near bankruptcy of the town was the construction of the Oamaru Borough Water Race, an aqueduct completed after three years' work in 1880. This major engineering feat replaced the previous poor water supply, (obtained from the local creek running through the town) with abundant pure water (and energy for industrial machinery driven by water motors) from the Waitaki river and conducted water in an open channel for almost 50 km through hilly farmland from Kurow to the Oamaru reservoir at Ardgowan, until it was decommissioned and abandoned in 1983. Today much of the former infrastructure is still intact and can still be traced.

The district went "dry" in July 1906, and stayed that way until 1960 – the last South Island district to resume alcohol sales.

Development slowed apart from a few years in the 1920s, and in the 1950s, but the population continued to grow until the 1970s. With the closure of the port the local economy began to stall, and New Zealand then went through radical economic restructuring in the mid 1980s – known as "Rogernomics". North Otago was then hit by two droughts from 1988 to 1989 and again from 1997 to 1999. Oamaru found itself hard hit. In response it started to re-invent itself, becoming one of the first New Zealand towns to realise that its built heritage was an asset.

A public art museum, the Forrester Gallery (whose first curator in 1882 was Thomas Forrester), opened in 1983 in R.A. Lawson's neo-classical Bank of New South Wales building. Restoration of other buildings also took place. The Oamaru Whitestone Civic Trust was formed in 1987 with a vision of redeveloping the original commercial and business district of Oamaru's Harbour and Tyne Streets, and work began on restoring the historic precinct beside the port, perhaps the most atmospheric urban area in New Zealand. By the early 21st century, "heritage" had become a conspicuous industry and today, the number of buildings owned by the Oamaru Whitestone Civic Trust had grown from the original eight to 17.

== Climate ==
The Köppen-Geiger climate classification system classifies the climate of Oamaru as oceanic (Cfb).

Climate data for Oamaru (1991–2020 normals, extremes 1966–present)
Month	Jan	Feb	Mar	Apr	May	Jun	Jul	Aug	Sep	Oct	Nov	Dec	Year
Record high °C (°F)	33.8 (92.8)	37.4 (99.3)	32.0 (89.6)	27.5 (81.5)	25.8 (78.4)	21.2 (70.2)	20.2 (68.4)	23.2 (73.8)	26.1 (79.0)	29.6 (85.3)	31.3 (88.3)	33.6 (92.5)	37.4 (99.3)
Mean maximum °C (°F)	29.4 (84.9)	28.5 (83.3)	27.4 (81.3)	23.5 (74.3)	21.0 (69.8)	17.9 (64.2)	17.8 (64.0)	19.4 (66.9)	22.3 (72.1)	24.7 (76.5)	26.9 (80.4)	27.4 (81.3)	31.2 (88.2)
Mean daily maximum °C (°F)	19.7 (67.5)	19.3 (66.7)	18.4 (65.1)	16.1 (61.0)	13.9 (57.0)	11.6 (52.9)	11.0 (51.8)	11.6 (52.9)	13.7 (56.7)	15.4 (59.7)	16.8 (62.2)	18.2 (64.8)	15.5 (59.9)
Daily mean °C (°F)	15.2 (59.4)	15.0 (59.0)	13.8 (56.8)	11.5 (52.7)	9.3 (48.7)	7.2 (45.0)	6.5 (43.7)	7.4 (45.3)	9.2 (48.6)	10.7 (51.3)	12.1 (53.8)	13.9 (57.0)	11.0 (51.8)
Mean daily minimum °C (°F)	10.7 (51.3)	10.6 (51.1)	9.1 (48.4)	6.9 (44.4)	4.8 (40.6)	2.7 (36.9)	2.0 (35.6)	3.1 (37.6)	4.7 (40.5)	6.0 (42.8)	7.5 (45.5)	9.6 (49.3)	6.5 (43.7)
Mean minimum °C (°F)	5.3 (41.5)	5.6 (42.1)	3.8 (38.8)	1.9 (35.4)	0.1 (32.2)	−1.4 (29.5)	−2.0 (28.4)	−1.1 (30.0)	−0.4 (31.3)	0.8 (33.4)	2.2 (36.0)	4.5 (40.1)	−2.3 (27.9)
Record low °C (°F)	0.6 (33.1)	1.1 (34.0)	0.6 (33.1)	−1.1 (30.0)	−4.2 (24.4)	−4.4 (24.1)	−5.4 (22.3)	−5.6 (21.9)	−1.6 (29.1)	−2.0 (28.4)	0.2 (32.4)	0.7 (33.3)	−5.6 (21.9)
Average rainfall mm (inches)	50.2 (1.98)	51.5 (2.03)	43.2 (1.70)	68.5 (2.70)	73.4 (2.89)	43.6 (1.72)	59.2 (2.33)	46.0 (1.81)	30.3 (1.19)	55.5 (2.19)	58.5 (2.30)	58.7 (2.31)	638.6 (25.15)
Source: NIWA

Climate data for Oamaru Airport (1991–2020 normals, extremes 1967–1985, 1999–present)
Month	Jan	Feb	Mar	Apr	May	Jun	Jul	Aug	Sep	Oct	Nov	Dec	Year
Record high °C (°F)	33.4 (92.1)	37.7 (99.9)	30.5 (86.9)	26.9 (80.4)	26.1 (79.0)	22.7 (72.9)	20.0 (68.0)	22.6 (72.7)	26.4 (79.5)	30.4 (86.7)	30.9 (87.6)	31.9 (89.4)	37.7 (99.9)
Mean maximum °C (°F)	29.0 (84.2)	27.8 (82.0)	26.2 (79.2)	23.3 (73.9)	20.5 (68.9)	18.0 (64.4)	17.2 (63.0)	18.7 (65.7)	21.8 (71.2)	24.0 (75.2)	26.1 (79.0)	27.4 (81.3)	30.9 (87.6)
Mean daily maximum °C (°F)	19.5 (67.1)	19.2 (66.6)	18.1 (64.6)	15.6 (60.1)	13.3 (55.9)	11.1 (52.0)	10.5 (50.9)	11.5 (52.7)	13.7 (56.7)	15.2 (59.4)	16.6 (61.9)	18.3 (64.9)	15.2 (59.4)
Daily mean °C (°F)	15.1 (59.2)	14.9 (58.8)	13.5 (56.3)	10.9 (51.6)	8.5 (47.3)	6.2 (43.2)	5.5 (41.9)	6.6 (43.9)	8.6 (47.5)	10.2 (50.4)	11.9 (53.4)	14.0 (57.2)	10.5 (50.9)
Mean daily minimum °C (°F)	10.7 (51.3)	10.5 (50.9)	8.9 (48.0)	6.2 (43.2)	3.7 (38.7)	1.3 (34.3)	0.4 (32.7)	1.7 (35.1)	3.4 (38.1)	5.3 (41.5)	7.2 (45.0)	9.6 (49.3)	5.7 (42.3)
Mean minimum °C (°F)	4.9 (40.8)	5.0 (41.0)	3.1 (37.6)	0.9 (33.6)	−1.4 (29.5)	−3.1 (26.4)	−4.0 (24.8)	−3.0 (26.6)	−2.0 (28.4)	0.1 (32.2)	1.6 (34.9)	4.5 (40.1)	−4.3 (24.3)
Record low °C (°F)	1.8 (35.2)	2.4 (36.3)	0.8 (33.4)	−1.6 (29.1)	−4.0 (24.8)	−5.7 (21.7)	−6.3 (20.7)	−4.8 (23.4)	−5.0 (23.0)	−2.4 (27.7)	−0.8 (30.6)	1.1 (34.0)	−6.3 (20.7)
Average rainfall mm (inches)	50.4 (1.98)	47.6 (1.87)	39.7 (1.56)	44.0 (1.73)	44.6 (1.76)	42.8 (1.69)	42.3 (1.67)	45.8 (1.80)	31.5 (1.24)	39.5 (1.56)	47.7 (1.88)	53.3 (2.10)	529.2 (20.84)
Source: NIWA

== Demographics ==
Oamaru is described by Statistics New Zealand as a medium urban area, which covers 20.21 km^{2} (7.80 sq mi) and had an estimated population of 14,300 as of June 2025, with a population density of 708 people per km^{2}.

Historical population
Year	Pop.	±% p.a.
2006	12,030	—
2013	12,270	+0.28%
2018	13,065	+1.26%
2023	13,680	+0.92%
The 2006 population is for a larger area of 21.46 km^{2}. Source:

Oamaru had a population of 13,680 in the 2023 New Zealand census, an increase of 615 people (4.7%) since the 2018 census, and an increase of 1,410 people (11.5%) since the 2013 census. There were 6,639 males, 7,008 females, and 33 people of other genders in 5,775 dwellings. 2.6% of people identified as LGBTIQ+. The median age was 46.1 years (compared with 38.1 years nationally). There were 2,289 people (16.7%) aged under 15 years, 2,217 (16.2%) aged 15 to 29, 5,649 (41.3%) aged 30 to 64, and 3,528 (25.8%) aged 65 or older.

People could identify as more than one ethnicity. The results were 82.6% European (Pākehā); 10.0% Māori; 8.3% Pasifika; 7.0% Asian; 0.6% Middle Eastern, Latin American and African New Zealanders (MELAA); and 2.4% other, which includes people giving their ethnicity as "New Zealander". English was spoken by 97.1%, Māori by 1.4%, Samoan by 0.4%, and other languages by 10.9%. No language could be spoken by 1.7% (e.g. too young to talk). New Zealand Sign Language was known by 0.5%. The percentage of people born overseas was 19.6, compared with 28.8% nationally.

Religious affiliations were 38.9% Christian, 1.2% Hindu, 0.7% Islam, 0.2% Māori religious beliefs, 0.5% Buddhist, 0.6% New Age, 0.1% Jewish, and 1.3% other religions. People who answered that they had no religion were 48.5%, and 8.1% of people did not answer the census question.

Of those at least 15 years old, 1,584 (13.9%) people had a bachelor's or higher degree, 6,135 (53.9%) had a post-high school certificate or diploma, and 3,675 (32.3%) people exclusively held high school qualifications. The median income was $32,800, compared with $41,500 nationally. 609 people (5.3%) earned over $100,000 compared to 12.1% nationally. The employment status of those at least 15 was 5,073 (44.5%) full-time, 1,449 (12.7%) part-time, and 231 (2.0%) unemployed.

Individual statistical areas
Name	Area (km^{2})	Population	Density (per km^{2})	Dwellings	Median age	Median income
Glen Warren	1.80	1,908	1,060	780	44.3 years	$29,300
Holmes Hill	2.62	1,416	540	639	52.8 years	$33,100
Oamaru Central	0.96	279	291	141	56.9 years	$26,800
Oamaru Gardens	1.49	1,152	773	513	47.9 years	$36,400
Oamaru North Milner Park	7.14	2,475	347	996	48.2 years	$30,200
Oamaru North Orana Park	2.76	3,018	1,093	1,233	39.9 years	$33,600
South Hill	1.45	2,247	1,550	1,005	47.0 years	$35,400
Weston	2.00	1,188	594	468	46.9 years	$41,000
New Zealand					38.1 years	$41,500

== Government ==
The town and district is governed by the Waitaki District Council. The mayor of Waitaki District is Melanie Tavendale.

Oamaru is part of the parliamentary electorate of Waitaki, and since 2023 has been represented by Miles Anderson of the New Zealand National Party.

== Points of interest ==
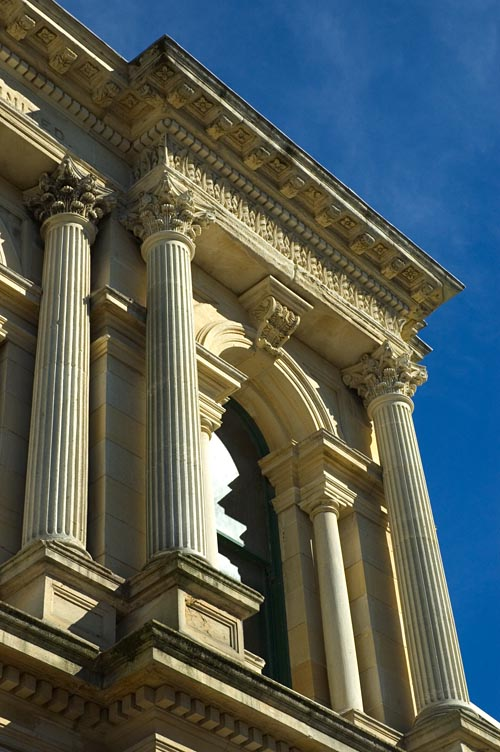
A building made of Oamaru stone, in the neo-classical style

Oamaru contains over 70 buildings registered as Category 1 or 2 Historic Places in the Heritage New Zealand register.

Many public buildings use as their construction material the local limestone (quarried especially near Weston) known as Oamaru stone. The Victorian precinct in the southern part of Oamaru's main commercial district ranks as one of New Zealand's most impressive streetscapes due to the many prominent 19th century buildings constructed from this material. Several key historic buildings in the area centred around Harbour Street and the lower Thames Street, Itchen Street, and Tyne Street area have been preserved by the Oamaru Whitestone Civic Trust as part of a historic precinct. The great palladian St Patrick's Basilica is also a fine example in white Oamaru stone.

The Victorian theme has been embraced by local shops and galleries in this part of Oamaru in terms of shop fittings and décor. Further enhancing the "olden days" feel of the precinct are several arts and crafts shops, a transportation museum, an antique furniture shop, and traditional businesses such as book shops, antique clothing shops, and a book binder. Many of the buildings in this area close to the harbour used to serve as commercial warehouses and stores and now provide large spaces for galleries such as the Forrester Gallery, the Grainstore Gallery, The Libratory, and Steampunk HQ. Even the playgrounds in the harbour area continue the Victorian/industrial steam theme with a giant penny-farthing structure supporting the swings, and several steampunk-styled playground features.

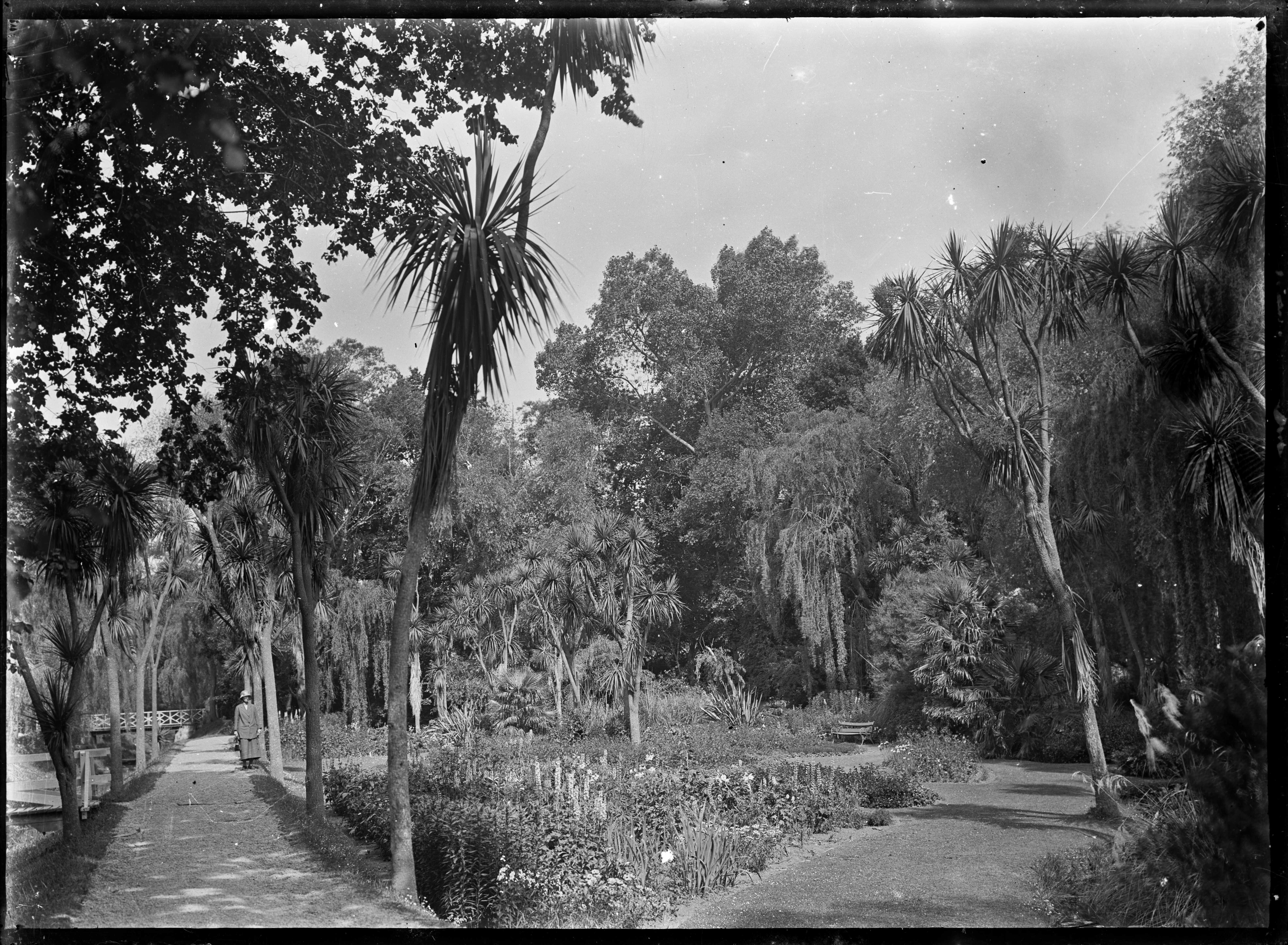
Public Gardens at Oamaru circa 1925

In August 2016 Oamaru made it into the Guinness Book of World Records for the largest gathering of steampunks in the world: a term that was coined in the 1980s and is based on imagining inventions the Victorians might have created for the modern world.

The main retail, services and commercial areas line Thames Street, Severn Street and State Highway 1 running through the town, whereas the historic grand commercial buildings dominate the area around lower Thames, Tees, and Tyne Streets.

A colony of little blue penguins lives in a disused quarry on the harbour not far from the historic precinct. The penguins established themselves in the early 1990s, once the rock quarry had been closed in the 1970s, and in 1992 a group of volunteers started to help make the area suitable as a breeding habitat for the penguins and provide guided tours. Apart from the success of the penguin colony, their efforts were rewarded with the colony receiving the Otago Regional Council's Environmental Award in 1995. During the early 2000s, a visitors' centre and two grandstands were completed, and today the Oamaru Blue Penguin Colony is Oamaru's largest tourist attraction, receiving over 75,000 visitors annually. It is owned by the Waitaki District Council and carefully managed by the Waitaki Development Board, including monitoring and comparing of behaviour and numbers with a similar penguin colony nearby which is not open to visitors.

A steam train operated by the Oamaru Steam and Rail Restoration Society runs between a small railway station in the historic precinct and a terminus at the harbour close to the little blue penguin colony on Sundays and during school holidays.

Further south just outside the town, a colony of yellow-eyed penguins at Bushy Beach also attracts ecotourists. Penguins sometimes live under buildings close to the beach, including the town's music club, The Penguin Club.

The North Otago Tree Planting Association, inaugurated by local Oamaru G.P. Dr. Eric Strawson Stubbs and North Otago farmer Mr. Syd Hurst in 1937, was a forerunner of the New Zealand Farm Forestry Association.

The historic Totara Estate is located 8 km south of Oamaru. Heritage New Zealand restored and opened these buildings to the public on 15 February 1982, exactly 100 years after the Dunedin's historic sailing, which began the New Zealand frozen meat industry. By 1902 frozen meat made up 20% of all New Zealand exports.

Tourism Waitaki is the official tourism body for the whole of Waitaki District.

== Recreation and leisure ==
The beautiful Oamaru Opera House on Thames Street, officially opened on 7 October 1907, is home to much of Oamaru's live entertainment and performances. It was restored in 2009. The refurbishment won the Public Architecture category of the 2010 Southern Architecture Awards and the 2011 NZIA Heritage award for Heritage Conservation. Oamaru Opera House is one of the most significant heritage sites in Oamaru, important to the town and nationally to New Zealand.

The Waitaki District Library has branches situated in Oamaru, Palmerston, Kurow, Hampden, Omarama, and Otematata (forming the Waitaki District Libraries syndicate).

Oamaru Public Library began life as the Oamaru Athenaeum and Mechanics Institute in 1878, but by 1973, library services had outgrown the building. A new library building was proposed, situated next-door to the 'old' Athenaeum library, and the new library was officially opened by the Mayor, Mr R.D. Allen on 19 September 1975.

Oamaru Repertory Theatre is located on Itchen Street and is the home of Oamaru's live theatre productions.

Oamaru hosts both a steampunk festival and an historically accurate Victorian festival annually.

The Oamaru Public Gardens were established in 1876 and contain a number of facilities such as a children's playground, Chinese garden and displays of plants and ferns. There are two Heritage New Zealand sites in the gardens. In the Wonderland Garden is the bronze Wonderland Statue by Scottish sculptor Thomas Clapperton. Unveiled in 1927 it has Category 2 heritage status. The band rotunda, which has a Category 2 heritage status, dates to 1912–1913 and was refurbished in 2005.

== Transport ==
Oamaru is on State Highway 1 (SH1), the main road route down the eastern coast of the South Island. There are regular coach and minibus services to Christchurch, Dunedin, and the Mackenzie Country, leaving from Eden Street outside the Lagonda Tearooms, which provides booking facilities and other travel services.

Oamaru is the end point of the Alps to Ocean Cycle Trail from Aoraki / Mount Cook, a cycle trail constructed following approval in 2010 by the New Zealand Cycle Trail project. The trail terminates at Friendly Bay, adjacent to Oamaru's Victorian Historic Precinct.

Oamaru Airport is 20 kilometres (12 mi) north of the town at Pukeuri. After Air New Zealand Link ceased operations in 2010, scheduled flights between Oamaru and Christchurch resumed in 2014 with Mainland Air. However they were terminated after a few months.

The main south line of the South Island Main Trunk Railway leads through Oamaru. A short side track connects Oamaru's historic precinct and a disused quarry at the harbour, with a tourist steam train running on Sundays. The 1900 railway station has been listed NZHPT Category II since 1983. It is a standard class B station, of weatherboard and corrugated iron.

== Education ==
There are three secondary schools in Oamaru, each catering for students in years 9 to 13. Waitaki Boys' High School is a secondary school for boys located in the northern part of Oamaru, with day and boarding facilities. It was founded in 1883, and has a roll of 425 students. Waitaki Girls' High School is a state high school for girls. It was founded in 1887, and has a roll of 395. It also has a boarding hostel which houses approximately 50 girls, including international students and tutors. St Kevin's College, Oamaru is a coeducational state-integrated Catholic day and boarding high school with a roll of 483. The school was founded in 1927.

St Joseph's School was established by the Dominican Sisters and the Christian Brothers. It is the only Catholic primary school in North Otago. It has a roll of 145 and it caters for students up to year 8. There are no longer any Sisters or Brothers on the staff and the school is run and managed by lay people.

Oamaru Intermediate provides education for years 7 and 8. It has a roll of 290. The other state primary schools in Oamaru, which cater for students up to year 6, are Fenwick School, with a roll of 281, Pembroke School, with a roll of 234, and Te Pākihi O Maru (previously called Oamaru North School), with a roll of 122.

Schools in surrounding areas include Weston School, Ardgowan School, Totara School and Five Forks School.

Rolls are as of July 2026.

== Sports ==
Oamaru has a comprehensive range of community sporting facilities for rugby, tennis, swimming, netball, cricket, golf, hockey, and bowls. Centennial Park is Oamaru's major sporting venue, and is the home of North Otago Rugby Football Union and North Otago Cricket. The council also owns and operates the Oamaru Aquatic Centre.

== Media ==
The Oamaru Mail is a weekly newspaper published every Friday by Allied Press Ltd. It has a team of reporters, who also write for the Otago Daily Times, based in Oamaru. It has served the people of the Waitaki region since 1876. The Oamaru Telegram is published every Tuesday and is produced, printed and published in Oamaru.

The town is within the coverage area of Radio Dunedin and within the circulation area of the Otago Daily Times, based in Dunedin. Oamaru has its own community television station, "45 South Television", which transmits from Cape Wanbrow on UHF Digital channel 34, and an independent classic rock radio station Real Classic Rock, which has studios based in Thames Street, and transmits from Cape Wanbrow. Oamaru also has a radio station called Oamaru FM 91.2 that also broadcasts from Cape Wanbrow.

From 1980 onwards, Oamaru was served by local Radio New Zealand station Radio Waitaki, until it was rebranded as The Hits in 2014. Port FM in Timaru also formerly broadcast local station Whitestone FM, before it reverted to the Port FM network, later becoming a More FM station.

== Notable people ==
Many of the early works of Janet Frame, who grew up in the town, reflect Oamaru conditions and Oamaruvians. Other literary associations include those with Owen Marshall, Greg McGee and Fiona Farrell Poole.

Other notable people born and educated in Oamaru include Des Wilson, founder of the UK homelessness charity, Shelter; Australian Prime Minister Chris Watson; New Zealand politicians Arnold Nordmeyer and William Steward; Cardinal Thomas Stafford Williams; Sir Malcolm Grant, former president and Provost of University College London and subsequently Chairman of NHS England and Chancellor of the University of York; and notably former All Blacks rugby union captain Richie McCaw.

Fred Allen, an All Black of the 1940s who went on to coach the All Blacks to 14 wins from his 14 tests in the 1960s, was born in Oamaru, though not educated there. Another notable sports person is Gary Robertson, who won gold at the 1972 Olympic Games, Munich, Germany in the NZ Rowing 8. Robertson is the only Olympic gold medalist from Waitaki. He was born in Waimate but grew up in Oamaru and was educated at Waitaki Boys High School.

The world first learned of the death of Robert Scott and the members of his team on their return from the ill-fated expedition to the South Pole by way of a cable sent from Oamaru, on 10 February 1913.

From 1906 to 1944 Frank Milner (1875–1944) was the headteacher at Waitaki Boys' High School.

Notable students include Charles Brasch (1909–1973) at Waitaki (1923–1926), a poet and patron of artists; Douglas Lilburn (1915–2001), "the elder statesman of New Zealand music"; James Bertram (1910–1993), writer and academic; Denis Blundell, a future Governor-General of New Zealand; and Ian Milner (1911–1991), the Rector's son, a Czech and English scholar falsely accused of spying for Communism.

E.A. Gifford (1819–1894), an artist and Royal Academician, lived in Oamaru from 1877 to 1885 and from 1892 until his death. A genre, portrait and landscape painter he established a national reputation. His Auckland from the Wharf of 1887 is probably the best-known image of 19th-century Auckland.

Emily Gillies, a 19th-century Oamaru artist, was the daughter of C.H. Street, maternal niece of Edward Lear (1812–1888), the English watercolourist and writer of humorous verse. Lear's sister had virtually brought her brother up. When he died childless before her she inherited his collection. The internationally-significant group of works came to North Otago, where it remained intact until the early 1970s.

The artist Colin McCahon (1919–1987) lived in Oamaru from 1930 to 1931, attending the Middle School. The place and the North Otago landscape made an impression on him. He revisited the area several times as an adult on painting trips. Cartoonist John Kent, who authored the Varoomshka comic strip for The Guardian newspaper in England, hailed from Oamaru.

A community of living artists exists, and many dealer galleries have premises in the historic precinct. One of the town's principal living artists, Donna Demente, produces portraits and masks. At least partly through her work Oamaru hosts an annual mask festival each July, the "Midwinter Masquerade". Another annual celebration, a Victorian Heritage fête, takes place in November.

Other noted former Oamaruvians include broadcaster Jim Mora and hockey player Scott Anderson. David Sewell played one test match for the New Zealand cricket team.

Video game designer Dean Hall grew up in Oamaru and attended Waitaki Boys' High School. His interest in mountaineering was fostered while on a geography field trip while studying there, ultimately culminating in him summiting Mount Everest in May 2013.

Interwar architect Gray Young was born in Oamaru in 1885 though moved northwards to Wellington as a young boy.

== Cultural references ==
Janet Frame fictionalised the Oamaru of her childhood as "Waimaru", her 'kingdom by the sea'. Some of Fiona Farrell's literary works also feature Oamaru. Peter F. Hamilton's novel The Dreaming Void (London: Macmillan, 2007; ISBN 978-1-4050-8880-0) refers to "the backwater External World of Oamaru" (page 22). The same author's science-fiction novel Great North Road mentions a remote camp called Oamaru, set up in the unexplored remote continent of Brogal on the Sirius-system planet St Libra in the year 2143.

Parts of Oamaru's Victorian precinct were used for the set of the Netflix films The Royal Treatment and The Power of the Dog. and in January 2025, the Netflix TV series East of Eden.

== Twin town ==
- Devizes, England
