= Isa Outhwaite =

Anne Jane Louisa Outhwaite (1842 – 13 December 1925) was a New Zealand watercolour artist, poet social activist and philanthropist. As an artist, she exhibited in Auckland from 1875 until 1900. Some of her works are held in the Alexander Turnbull Library.

== Biography ==
Outhwaite was born in Auckland in 1842. Her father was Thomas Outhwaite, New Zealand's first Supreme Court Registrar, and her mother was the French-born Marie Henrietta Louise Outhwaite (née Roget). Outhwaite exhibited with the Auckland Society of Artists and the New Zealand Art Students Association between 1875 and 1900. Some of her sketches were published in the newspaper New Zealand Graphic in 1879.

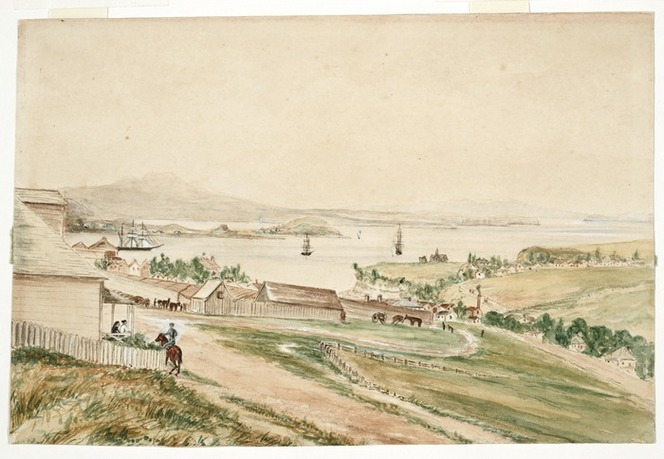
1867 painting by Isa Outhwaite, "Parnell, looking towards North Head and Rangitoto"

Outhwaite and her mother were close friends of Suzanne Aubert, founder of the religious order the Daughters of Our Lady of Compassion. She conducted a correspondence with Mother Aubert for many years. When Aubert spent six years in Rome seeking recognition from Pope Benedict XV for her order, Outhwaite supported her financially. Outhwaite was also a prison "official visitor" and welfare worker for women prisoners at Mount Eden Prisons.

She wrote poetry and in 1916 she contributed a verse to a very early Australian ANZAC day memorial book (Their death Our Life: For the mortal shroud of our immortal heroes, Love weaves Peace).

Isa Outhwaite died on 13 December 1925 aged 83. She is interred in the Catholic section of Waikaraka Cemetery, Onehunga.

Among the beneficiaries of her will were the Sisters of Compassion (£500), St Joseph's School, Grey Lynn (£250), St Mary's Orphanage, Howick (£250), the Little Sisters of the Poor (£1000), Mater Misericordiae Hospital (£1500), Bishop Cleary (£500 to be used to support female prisoners released from Mt Eden prison), and the remainder of her estate to Bishop Cleary for Catholic education in Auckland. This bequest led to the establishment of St Peter's College on the Outhwaite family land fronting Khyber Pass Road and Mountain Road. She also left the family home and land in Grafton to Newmarket Borough Council, which was later developed into Outhwaite Park, and left Hen Island (Taranga) of Hen and Chicken Islands near Whangārei to the New Zealand government for a bird sanctuary. Isa Outwaite also gave money for the relief of poverty in Besançon, France and is publicly remembered there for her philanthropy.

== Legacy ==
In 2015, St Peter's College completed a 12-classroom block on Mountain Rd named the "Outhwaite Building" in memory of Isa Outhwaite and her family and in gratitude for the legacy of funds and land on which the college was established.

== See also ==
- Outhwaite family (Auckland)
- Louise Outhwaite
