= Louise Outhwaite =

Marie Henrietta Louise Outhwaite (née Roget) (1811 – 4 July 1905) was a French-born New Zealand settler. She was a leading figure in the Catholic church in Auckland and a close friend and supporter of Suzanne Aubert.

== Biography ==
Outhwaite was born in Paris, France, in 1811. She met and married an Anglican Englishman, Thomas Outhwaite, in Paris. The couple arrived in Auckland in 1841 aboard the Tyne. They expected their stay in New Zealand to be short, and left their four-year-old daughter Victorine (born in Paris in 1837) with her French grandmother in Paris. Events developed differently however, and the Outhwaites and Victorine did not reunite until 1855 when they travelled to England and France with their three New Zealand-born children, Isa (born 1842), Charles (born 1845) and William (born 1847).

Outhwaite's husband became the first registrar of the Supreme Court in New Zealand, and the couple became involved in social and philanthropic works in Auckland. Outhwaite became acquainted with Suzanne Aubert and her Catholic order of nuns, and supported her work. In 1871 Aubert stayed with the Outhwaites for six weeks when she had to move out of her cottage at Shelly Bay.

== See also ==
- Outhwaite family (Auckland)
- Isa Outhwaite
