= Grafton Bridge =

Bridge in Auckland, New Zealand

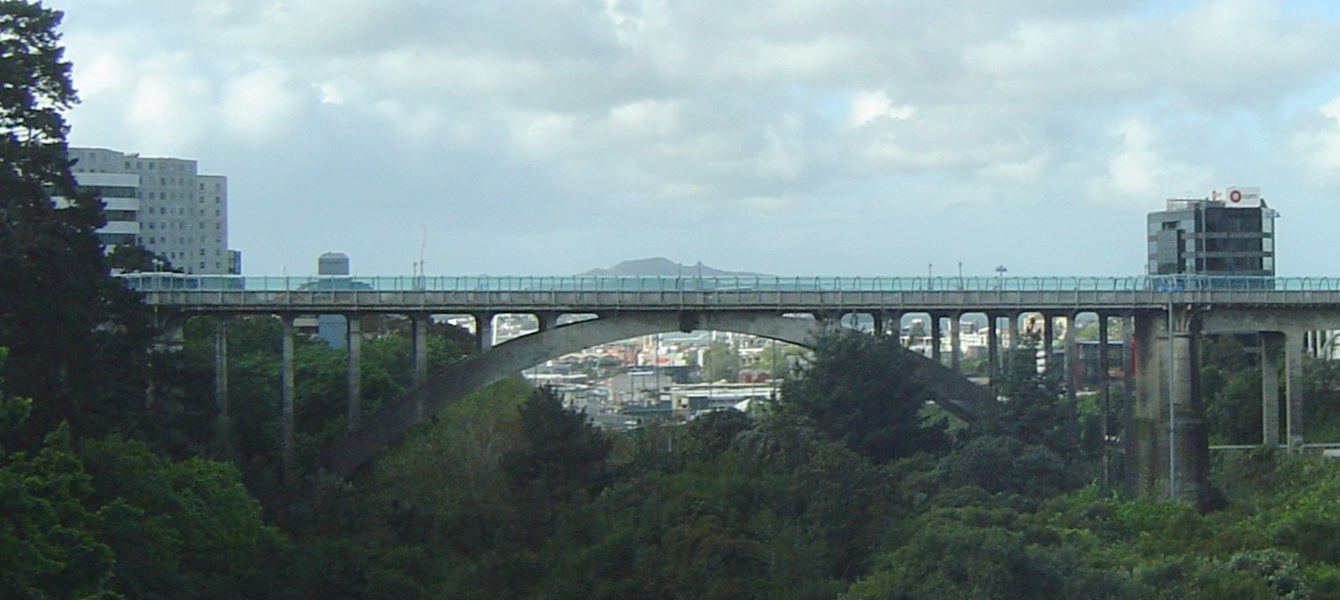
- Coordinates: 36°51′33.88″S 174°45′54.95″E
- Carries: Buses, motor vehicles, pedestrians and bicycles
- Crosses: Grafton Gully
- Locale: Auckland, New Zealand

Characteristics
- Design: Deck arch bridge
- Material: Reinforced concrete
- Total length: 97.5 m (320 ft)
- Height: 25.6 m (84 ft)
- No. of spans: 1
- Clearance below: 43.3 m (142 ft)

History
- Engineering design by: Robert Forbes Moore; Karl Rosegger Agster
- Constructed by: Ferro-Concrete Company of Australasia
- Construction start: 1908
- Construction end: 1910
- Opened: 28 April 1910

Heritage New Zealand – Category 1
- Designated: 23 June 1983
- Reference no.: 16

Location
- Interactive map of Grafton Bridge

Grafton Bridge is a road bridge spanning Grafton Gully in Auckland, New Zealand. Built of reinforced concrete in 1910, it connects the Auckland CBD and Karangahape Road with Grafton. It spans about 97.6 metres (320 feet), rises 25.6 metres (84 feet) above the abutments to a height of around 43 metres (141 feet) over the gully. When the bridge was constructed, it contained the largest reinforced concrete arch in the world.

The bridge is listed by Heritage New Zealand and on the IPENZ Engineering Heritage Register. In a 2006 poll of 600 alumni of the University of Auckland School of Engineering, the bridge was third in the list of New Zealand engineering achievements, after Manapouri Power Station and Black Magic.

Since 2009 the bridge has formed a core part of the Central Connector public transport route between the CBD and Newmarket, and is closed to private vehicles except taxis during the day.

== History ==
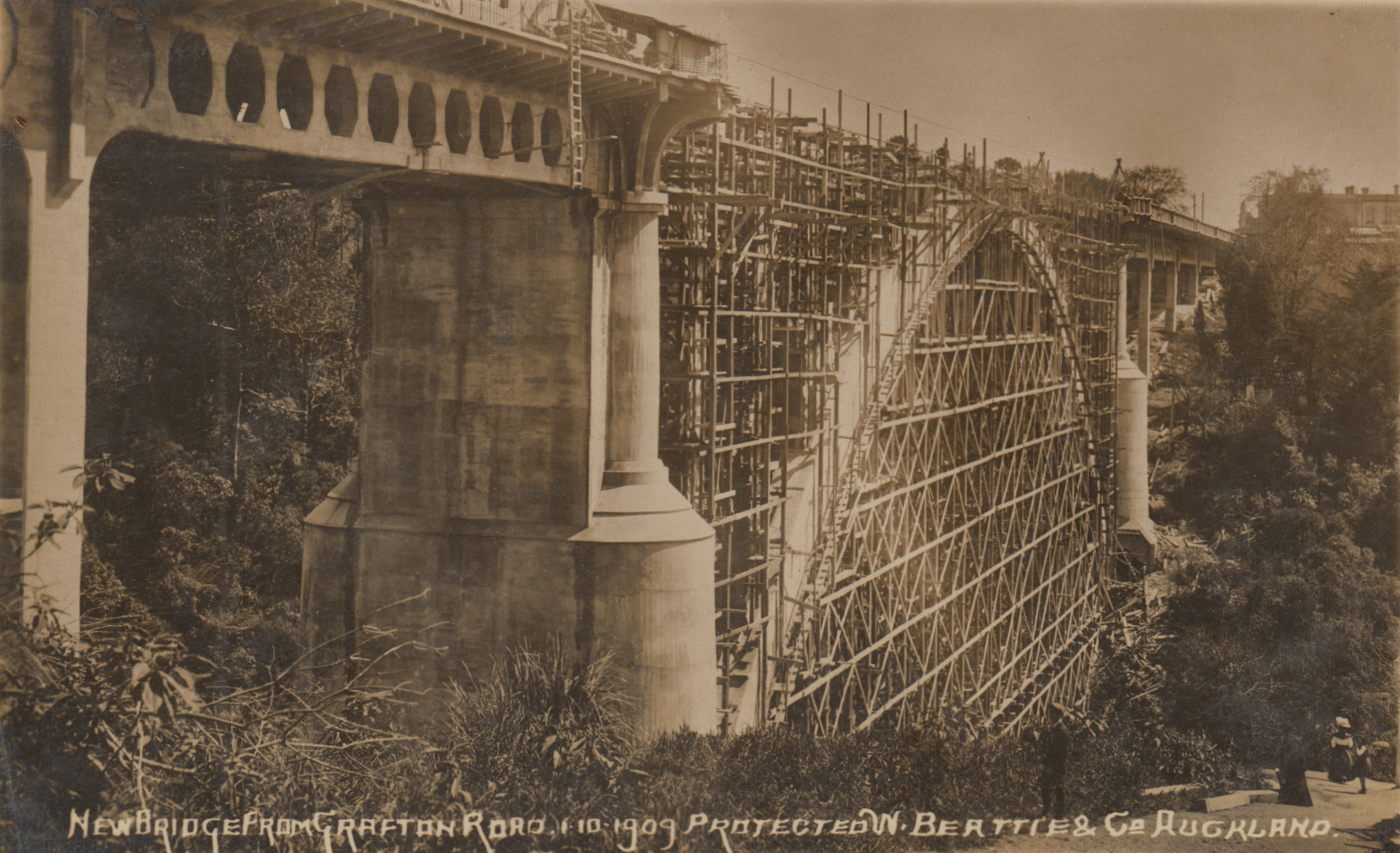
Photograph of Grafton Bridge during construction, with scaffolding beneath the single main arch

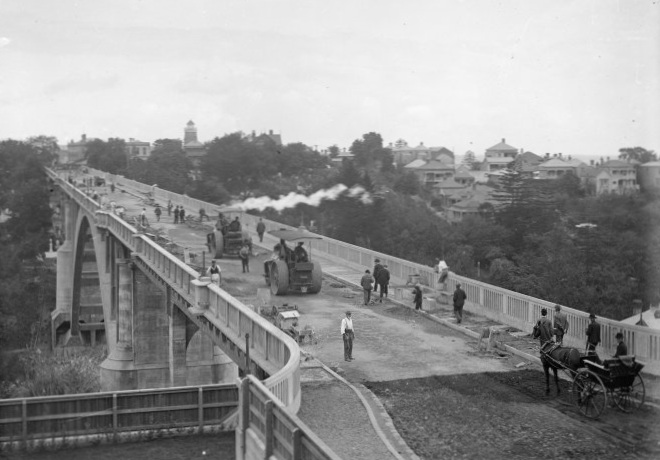
Finishing works on the bridge in 1910

Prior to the current structure, two previous bridges spanned the Grafton gully. The first, built in 1884, was a cable-stay pedestrian bridge from the bottom of St Martins Lane to Bridge Street in Grafton (the current bridge connects Karangahape Road and Grafton Road). Designed by the City Engineer Edward Anderson, the first bridge proved to be comparatively unstable, at least towards the end of its life when it would appear that maintenance was not kept up. By the time it was approaching 20 years old, police were stationed at each end after rugby matches to ensure rowdy crowds did not cause it to wobble alarmingly by jumping or stamping on it. In 1904, a report showed it was not only beyond repair but that it was lucky it hadn't collapsed. It was immediately closed and supplemented by a temporary bridge of quite simple design at the bottom of the gully. The old disused bridge stood until 1906. Discussions within Council over the design of a new permanent bridge dragged on for years, requiring a rebuild of the temporary bridge and the construction of long flights of wooden steps from St Martins Lane and Bridge Street to make pedestrian access easier. There was conflict over whether any new bridge should be another pedestrian bridge or one that would take vehicle traffic as well. Eventually the decision to build a road bridge was taken.

In 1907 the Auckland City Council received two tenders for the bridge: a cheaper steel structure proposed by the American Bridge Company, and a more expensive ferro-concrete option designed by engineers R. F. Moore and Karl Rosegger Agster for the Ferro-Concrete Company of Australasia. The city's engineer, W. E. Bush, who supervised the project, recommended the more expensive option, as maintenance costs would be significantly less than the steel option. The ferro-concrete design of the bridge was championed by the mayor Arthur Myers, who advocated for it to be twice as wide as built. Even in its narrower form it was to cost £31,918, resulting in it being called "Myers' Folly" by many at the time, but was also seen to symbolise a commitment to a 'Greater Auckland', indicating leadership in technology development. Many people maintained that the city would never get big enough to warrant the cost of so large a piece of engineering. Conversely Myers predicted that the population of Auckland would double in the next two decades, and he was proved correct.

Construction work was undertaken over two years, and the bridge opened in April 1910. Construction was difficult due to the steep Grafton gully, covered in native bush. During the project, the Ferro-Concrete Company declared bankruptcy, likely due to the terms of the contract for the bridge which stipulated that no progress payments could be made to the company until the concrete arches were completed and tested. Work was finished by Auckland City council labour. The bridge crosses part of the Symonds Street Cemetery, a historic Auckland cemetery containing the graves of many important early settlers, including the first Governor William Hobson. When the current bridge was constructed the cemetery had been in existence for 70 years, and the bridge was inserted in such a way as to require the moving of only eight graves.

Built of reinforced concrete by the Ferro-Concrete Company of Australasia Ltd, at opening it was claimed to have been the biggest-span concrete arch bridge in the world. It utilises large 'false piers' on each side of the central arch, which give the appearance of strength in the classical masonry style, but are not required to be anywhere as massive, since the arch itself carries the full load via the thin vertical members. It resembles closely similar bridges of the period, specifically the Howard Taft Memorial Bridge in Washington DC Taft Bridge which took ten years to construct 1897-1907 (as opposed to the two years for Grafton Bridge).

In order to dispel doubts about the strength of the still relatively untested type of construction, at the opening in April 1910 two steam rollers were driven across it. This lack of trust also led to a stipulation in the original construction contract that no progress payments should be made, causing the construction company to go into bankruptcy, with the bridge having to be completed by the city. This also added to the final costs, which were around £33,000.

The bridge had very low maintenance costs, until 1936 when cracks in the structure worsened and a large concrete chunk near the Grafton side of the structure fell off. After repairs were made, the bridge was opened for exclusively car and pedestrian traffic; meaning that any trucks or fire engines accessing the Auckland City Hospital needed to take a longer route.

== Function ==
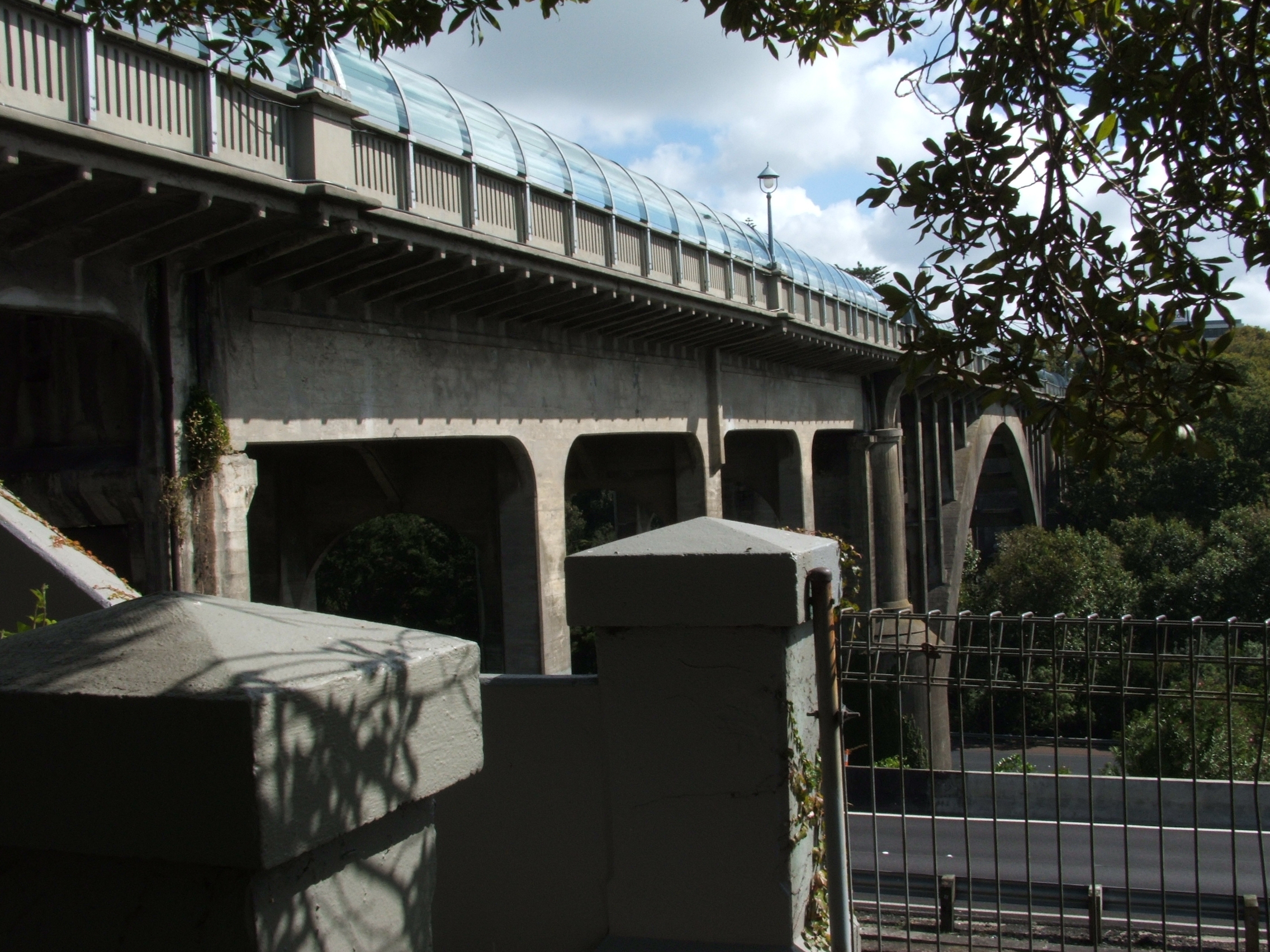
North side of Grafton Bridge, as seen from the east.

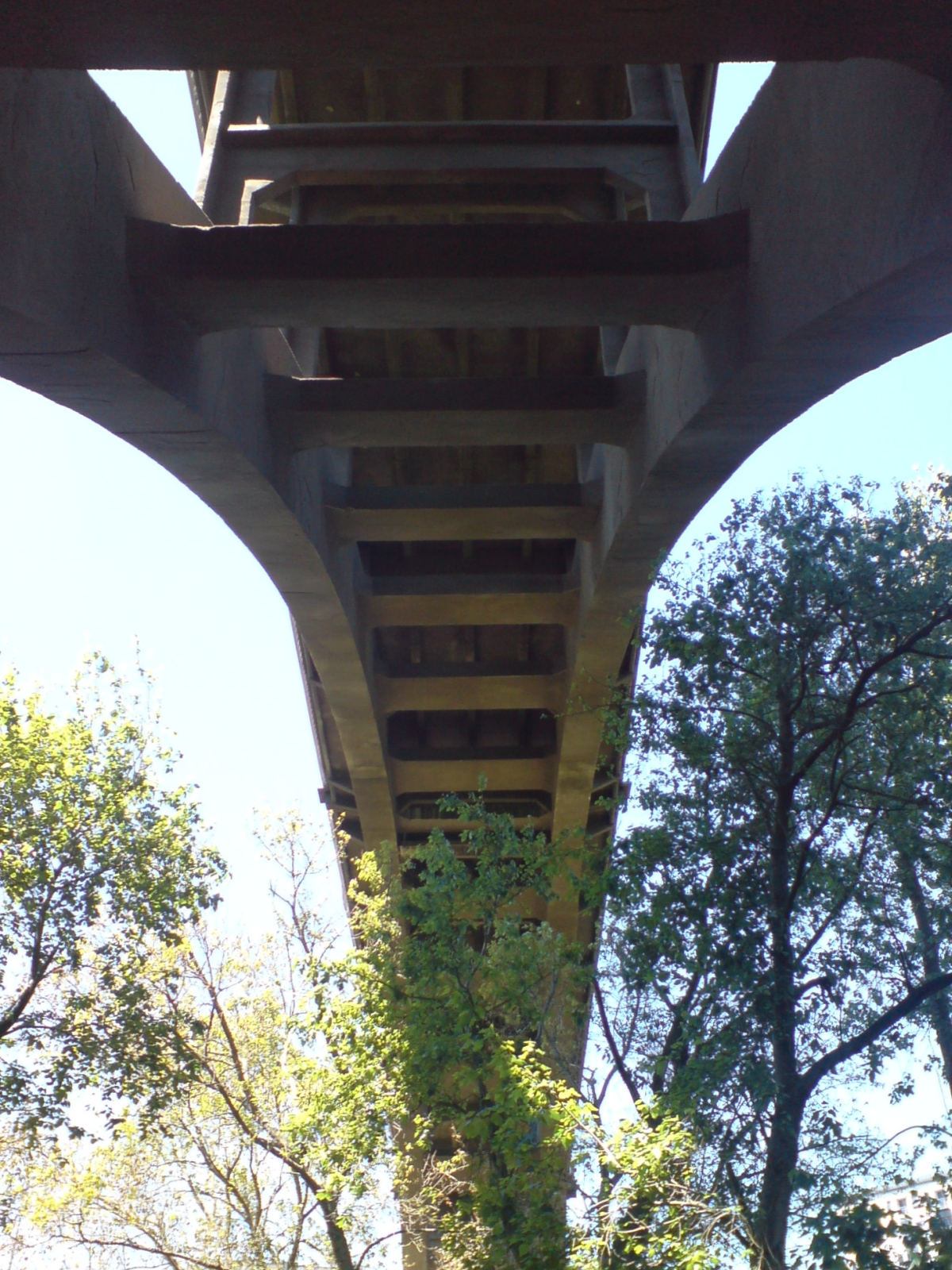
The bridge from underneath.

=== Overview ===
The bridge carries one traffic lane in each direction and a footpath on each side. It underwent reinforcing repairs in 1938 when cracks were discovered in the Vierendeel frames of the approach areas of the bridge. The remedy was to erect two steel trusses on the deck to support the damaged area. The octagonal openings were filled in and are no longer a feature of the bridge. These repairs cost £21,800. After this point a weight limit was imposed on traffic using the bridge; even during the Second World War the large trucks used by the US Forces stationed in the camp located in the Domain were not allowed to drive over Grafton Bridge. Further reinforcing was carried out in 1957.

The bridge was closed for reinforcement works between late 2008 and October 2009 as part of the Central Connector, a 3 km bus priority route connecting the Auckland CBD to Newmarket and other destinations. It received a $7 million carbon fibre strengthening upgrade to bring it up to current earthquake standards and to enable it to serve as a dedicated route for large numbers of buses. It can now accommodate up to 1200 bus trips a day. The bridge now has a load-carrying capacity of 40 tonnes, instead of the previous 13 tonnes.

In October 2009 the bridge was reopened by Mayor John Banks. The footpaths are covered with curved transparent screens installed in 2002, to prevent people from falling or jumping off and providing weather cover (the bridge had suicide prevention barriers from as early as 1936, replaced with mesh screens in 1957 that were removed in 1997. After the removal, suicides increased fivefold, leading to a quiet re-installation in 2002). There have been no suicides from the bridge since then until 2015, and the feature has been called an example of best practice of preventing such acts.

=== Transit corridor ===
The bridge in 2007 carried around 13,000 vehicles per day. Starting in 2009, Auckland City planned to use the bridge as a major part of the Central Connector project, connecting downtown Auckland and the commercial centre of Newmarket with improved bus services. This resulted in the bridge becoming a 7am to 7pm bus lane with other traffic banned, prioritising up to 1,500 daily bus trips and up to 65,000 passengers.

For this project, somewhat controversial due to the interruption of the direct car connection to Grafton, the bridge was tested and in 2008–2009, strengthened. The modification design was undertaken by Beca, Carter, Hollings & Ferner. The modifications, which for structural reasons closed the bridge to all but cyclist and pedestrian traffic starting October 2008, were to ensure that the weight limit could be raised from 13 tons to 40 tons, allowing heavier buses to cross. The works also ensured that the bridge would be able to withstand a 1000-year earthquake. The bridge had been found to be in good shape, despite around 2,800 primarily minor faults being found during the upgrade, and only two pieces of reinforcing steel had to be replaced. Costs were originally expected to be around $7.3 million for new anchors at the two main piers, carbon fibre wrapping around various steelwork and improvements to footpaths. The strengthening process involved the use of epoxy resin injections in cracked areas concrete beams and columns, the first time this technique had been used on a major structure in New Zealand.

In October 2009, the bridge was reopened ahead of schedule, the works having cost $6.9 million. However, the full intended level of bus services did not immediately use the bridge, as the Central Connector project was not finished. Compliance with the bus lane regulations was low initially, and after issuing warnings only for an initial period Auckland City Council began issuing infringement notices, ticketing 831 offenders during the first five days.

The bridge is open to buses and emergency services from 7am to 7pm Monday to Friday, closed to other traffic. At other times it is open to all traffic.
