= Grafton Volcano =

Buried volcano in Auckland, New Zealand

Coordinates: 36.862°S 174.770°E

Grafton Volcano is a buried volcano in New Zealand's Auckland volcanic field that underlies much of the Auckland suburb of Grafton. First recognised in 2010, it includes the Outhwaite Park scoria cone that was first mapped by Hochstetter (1864) and inferred by later geologists to be a late phase vent of adjacent Pukekawa Volcano. Borehole drilling and building excavations in the Grafton-Auckland Domain area during the 1990s and 2000s provided new subsurface geological information that allowed geologists to recognise the buried Grafton Volcano.

== Structure ==
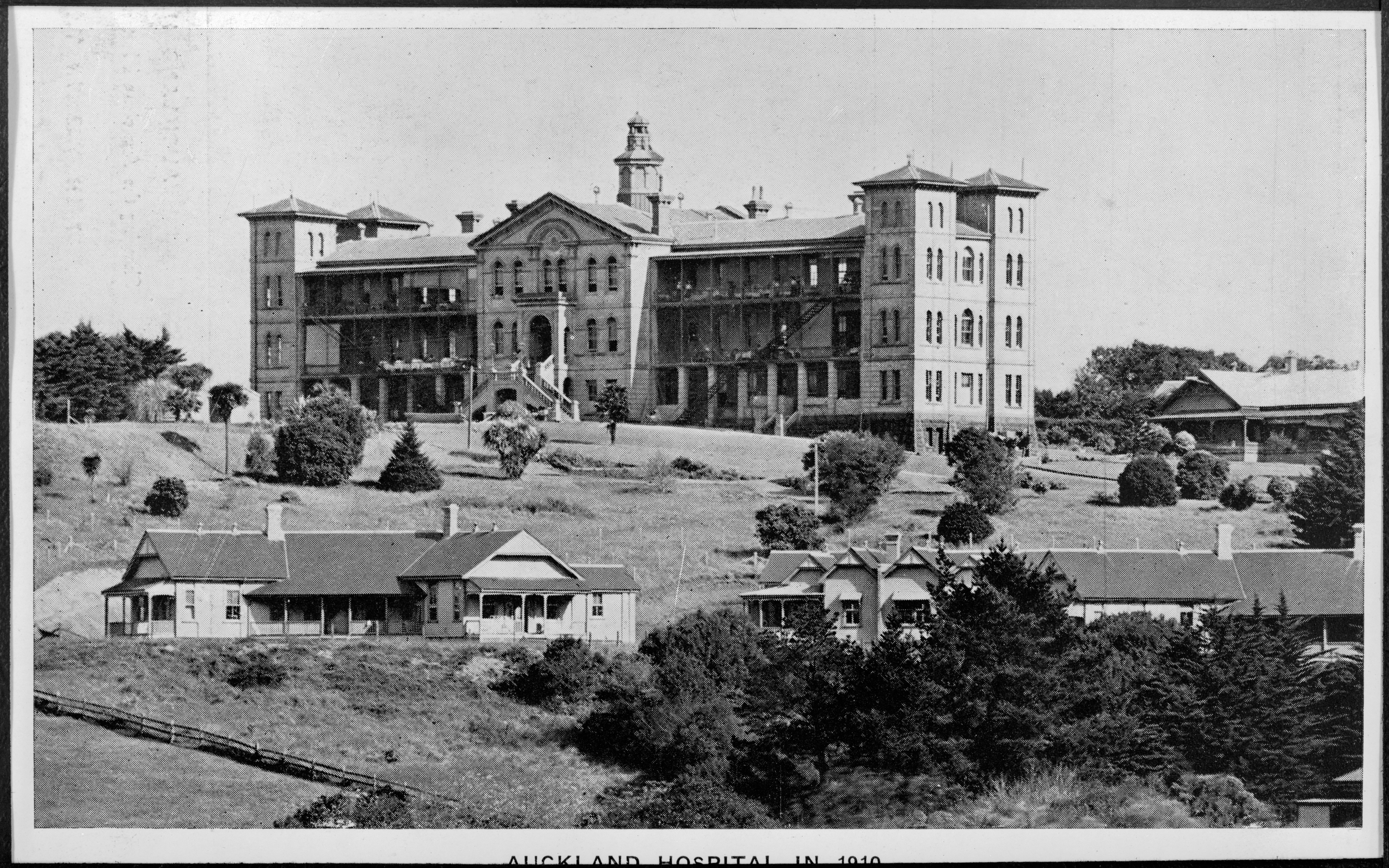
This 1877 hospital building, replaced in the 1960s, was built over a Grafton Volcano scoria cone.

The central and western parts of this Grafton Volcano comprise a tuff ring arc surrounding a 600-metre (2,000 ft) diameter explosion crater filled with a solidified lava lake (basalt) at least 50 metres (160 ft) thick, which underlies and surrounds scoria cones that erupted from two vents within the crater (at Outhwaite Park and the east end of Auckland Hospital). Most of Grafton Volcano is buried beneath 2–10 metres (7–33 ft) of volcanic ash that forms the western sector of the adjacent Pukekawa tuff ring.

== Neighbouring Domain Volcano ==
Subsurface information suggests that the Pukekawa Volcano probably erupted 5–100 years after the Grafton Volcano from a separate batch of magma that rose most of the way up the same conduit. The Pukekawa explosion crater erupted 500 metres (1,600 ft) east of Grafton Volcano and blasted through and destroyed the eastern arc of Grafton Volcano’s tuff ring and basalt-filled crater floor, creating its own 600-metre-diameter (2,000 ft) explosion crater and surrounding tuff ring. Widespread cobble-sized chunks of basalt within the Pukekawa tuff deposits are probably shattered parts of the Grafton crater floor.

The ages of the Grafton and Pukekawa volcanoes were until recently not known precisely, although a tree under the Pukekawa tuff ring was radiocarbon dated at over 50,000 years old. Recent studies have shown them to be approximately 100,000 years old.

The fractures and rubble within the solidified lava lakes of the Grafton and Pukekawa volcanoes now form a significant groundwater reservoir utilised by Auckland Hospital and the Domain.

Whether the Grafton and Pukekawa volcanoes are recognised as separate volcanoes or merely two halves of a more complex single volcano is a matter yet to be resolved and agreed upon by scientists.
