= Outhwaite family (Auckland) =

Settlers in Auckland, New Zealand

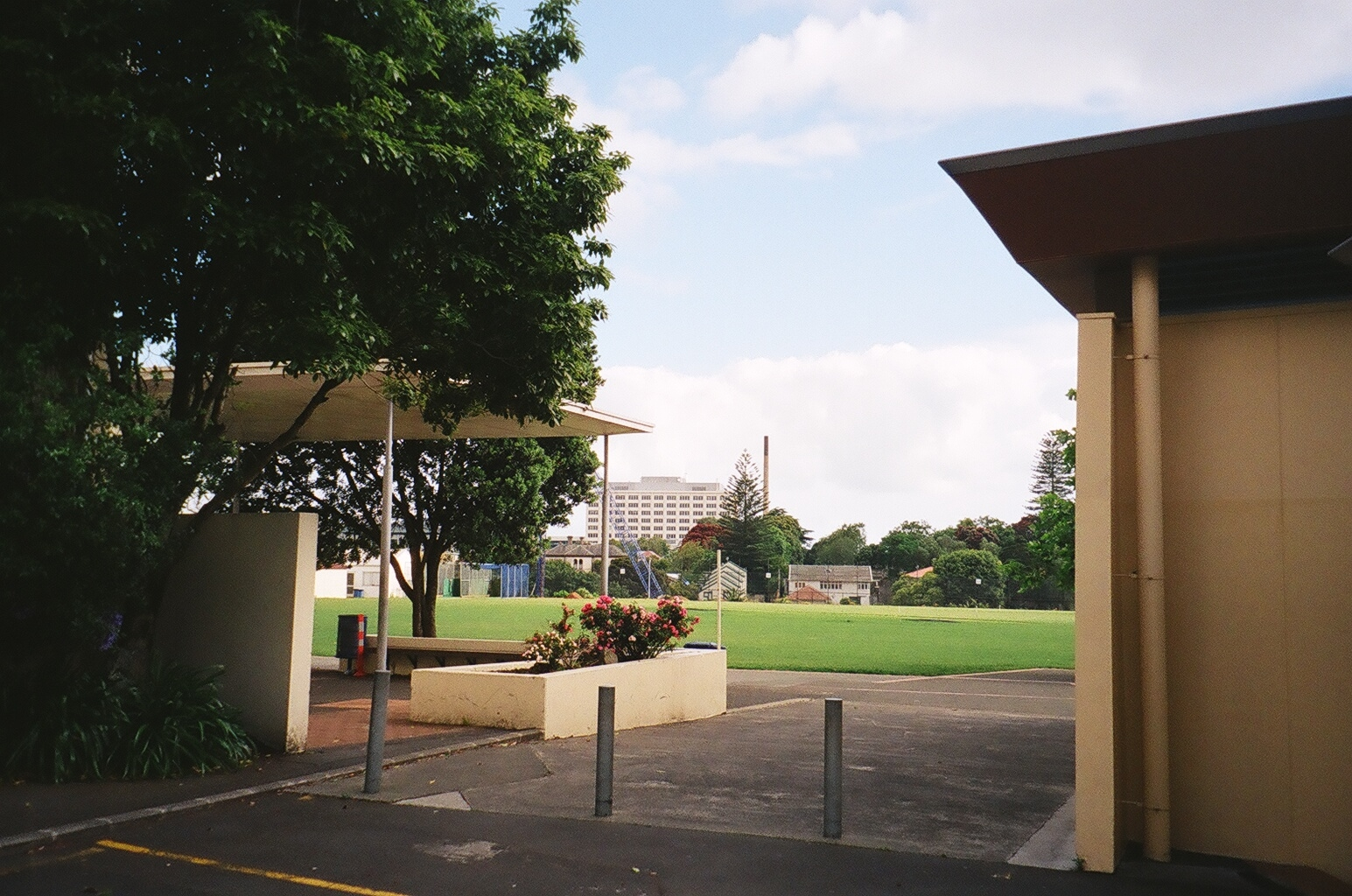
St Peter's College Oval and Outhwaite Park

The Outhwaite family were early settlers in Auckland, New Zealand and were a prominent family in Auckland in the first 85 years of the city's existence. They made substantial contributions to the legal, administrative, musical, literary, artistic, social and sporting life of the city. They were also important in the establishment and growth of the Catholic Church in Auckland and through their social and philanthropic activities. Their influence still continues, especially in respect of their donation of two areas of land in the central Auckland suburb of Grafton which are now Outhwaite Park and St Peter's College. The family also enabled the creation of a conservation reserve in the Hen and Chicken Islands.

== Thomas Outhwaite ==
Thomas Outhwaite was born at Ormside Hall in Westmorland in 1805 and later lived in Preston. He practised as a solicitor in Paris before coming to New Zealand in 1841 on the ship, the Tyne, with the first Chief Justice of New Zealand, the Hon Sir William Martin and Hon William Swainson, the second Attorney-General of New Zealand. While on board, they worked on the drafting of the ordinances which would be necessary to establish the Supreme Court and its procedure.

Thomas Outhwaite was formally appointed by Lord John Russell of the Colonial Office as Registrar of the Supreme Court (now the High Court of New Zealand) and was the first person to hold that position (apart from Robert Fitzgerald, a planter from the West Indies who had, without the permission of the Colonial Office, just been appointed by Governor Hobson and who resigned in favour of Outhwaite) which he took up on 1 January 1842. Outhwaite also conducted a practice as a Barrister and was "the foremost Auckland lawyer". From 1844 Thomas Russell was his articled clerk for seven years and later became his partner and took over his practice. When Thomas Outhwaite retired in 1869, Sir George Arney, the second Chief Justice of New Zealand, paid tribute to Outhwaite's extraordinary firmness, patience, discretion and self-command. Outhwaite was also an active Auckland property developer and investor. For example, in 1874, he purchased William Swainson's "upper paddock" next to St Stephen's Chapel, Judges Bay and this area was cut up into numerous small building allotments.

Outhwaite was a very well-qualified musician. He had a fine tenor voice and, while in Paris, he had sung publicly. He had also studied the flute and the theory of music in harmony and counterpoint. He played both the piano and the violin and was the founder and conductor of the Sacred Harmonic Society, a forerunner of the Auckland Choral Society. Thomas Outhwaite delivered a lecture on 23 May 1843 on the History of Music with the principles he expounded being illustrated by the Philharmonic Society. This lecture appears to have engendered an interest in music in Auckland. He conducted the Philharmonic Society's orchestra and the Choral Society until 1852. He also acted as a conductor of church choirs. He was an enthusiastic supporter of the Auckland Mechanics Institute, of which he was vice-president, and was also a trustee of the savings bank. Thomas Outwaite was also interested in sport and in January 1845 he played Cricket for the Benedict's team on Bosworth Field. He died on 14 July 1879.

=== Grafton ===
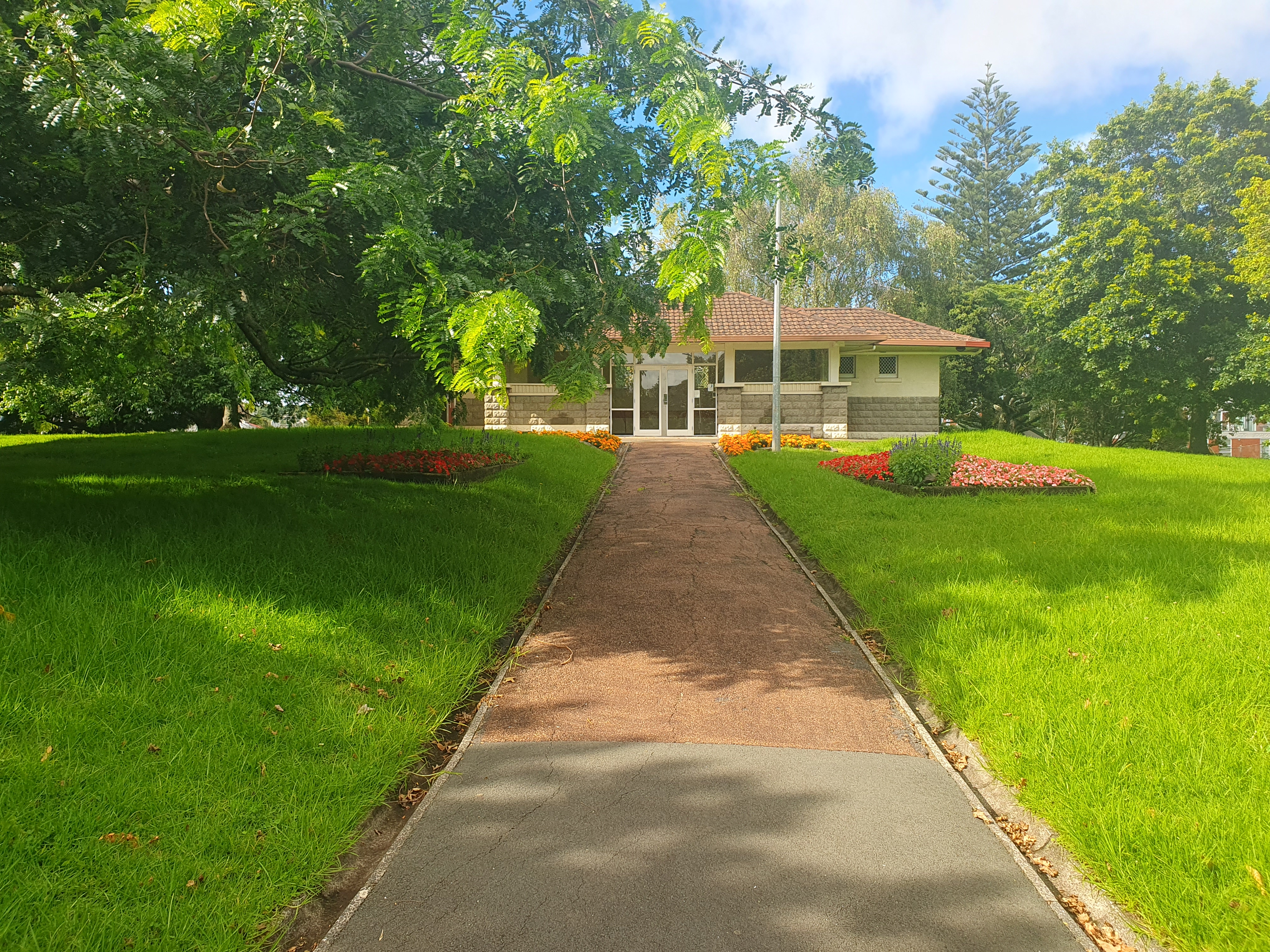
Outhwaite Hall in Outhwaite Park

It appears that Thomas Outhwaite and his family were living near the Auckland Domain by 1843. In 1844 he bought land and built a house on the south-western corner of Carlton Gore Road and Park Road opposite the Domain in the present-day Auckland suburb of Grafton. Most of this property was subdivided over the years and sold off although a parcel of land on the south side of Khyber Pass Road was gifted by Isa Outhwaite to the Catholic Church and is now the location of St Peter's College. The remaining portion of the family property included the family house on the corner of Carlton Gore Road and Park Road was gifted to the Newmarket Borough Council as a public amenity, and after the demolition of the house, Outhwaite Park was laid out, retaining as many of the mature specimen trees as possible.

== Louise Outhwaite ==
Thomas Outhwaite's wife was Marie Henrietta Louise Outhwaite (née Roget) (1811–1905).

Thomas and Louise had four children, two sons and two daughters. Victorine Outhwaite was born in Paris in 1837. Isa Outhwaite was born in Auckland in 1842. Charles Outhwaite was born in Auckland in 1845 and William Eugene was also born in Auckland in 1847. None of the four children married or had their own children.

== Isa Outhwaite ==
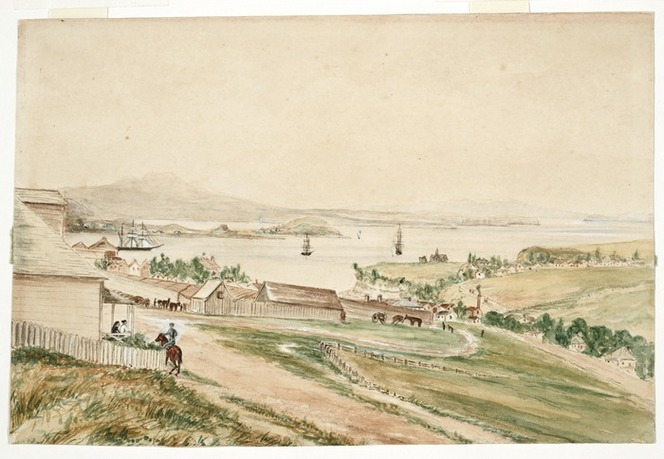
Parnell, looking towards North Head and Rangitoto, painted by Isa Outhwaite

Anne Jane Louisa "Isa" Outhwaite (1842–1925) was a noted artist. She exhibited in Auckland from 1875 until 1900.

== Charles Thomas Outhwaite ==
Charles Thomas Outhwaite was born in Auckland in 1845. He was a sportsman, and judges associate. He was educated in Auckland (at St Peter's School) and in Paris; he was, for a period, associate to Sir George Arney, Chief Justice of New Zealand. "Although a keen sportsman, yachtsman and cricketer, an accomplished musician and a lover of literature, Mr. Outhwaite was of a retiring disposition, taking no part in public life, yet generously interested in the advancement of his country and the well-being of its people."

Charles Outhwaite died on 24 June 1925 aged 80.

== William Eugene Outhwaite ==
William Eugene Outhwaite (B.A., Oxon., Barrister-at-Law of the Inner temple) was born in Auckland in 1847 He spent some of his early child life in Paris and London. He received some education in Paris.

When he returned to New Zealand he was "an excellent marksman with the rifle" so signed on for the New Zealand Wars as a teenager at 15 (under the appointed age of 16) but did not see action. He received further education at St Peter's School, Auckland where he was taught by Richard O'Sullivan and at the Church of England Grammar School.

He studied law in the 1860s at Oxford. He received help in choosing a college (Lincoln College was chosen) and hospitality while he was in England from Cardinal Newman who was a friend of Bishop Pompallier, the first Catholic Bishop of Auckland.

Outhwaite was in London in 1871 according to the English Census. He returned to Auckland after he became a Barrister-at-Law of the Inner Temple and in Auckland became a barrister of the Courts of New Zealand (admitted in 1890) and "took office."

He was a sportsman (he played cricket), sports enthusiast and critic as well as practising as a lawyer. He was a writer and playwright. He wrote an educative play called A Ladies' Guide to Cricket and a libretto for the cantata Art and Mind. This cantata was originally written (with music composed by Auckland composer, Carl Schmitt) for the opening of the Auckland Art Gallery building in 1887, but it was not first performed until 1888. The libretto, which was written in poetic form, was considered to "have no mean literary merit" (e.g. Weird as the wind in forest pines,/Loud as the dashing, surging sea/Sweet as the bell-bird's matin song/Swell our paeons of harmony).

William Outhwaite wrote other poetry which was published and he was a theatre critic (under the name "Orpheus") for several publications. He was also a cellist. He died on 10 April 1900.

== Interment and memory ==
Louise, Victorine, Isa, Charles and William Outhwaite are interred in the Catholic section of Waikaraka Cemetery, Onehunga. Thomas Outhwaite is buried, with his unmarried sister, Ann Jane Outhwaite, who lived with the family and who died in 1881, in the graveyard of St Stephen's Chapel, Judges Bay (an Anglican cemetery). On 2 May 2012 a ceremony was held to bless the restored Outhwaite family grave at Waikaraka Cemetery. The restoration occurred on the initiative of Hillsborough resident, Jenny Doherty.

The blessing was carried out by Monsignor David Tonks, on behalf of Bishop Patrick James Dunn, Catholic Bishop of Auckland, and in the presence of representatives of St Peter's College ("about two dozen boys" who performed the St Peter's College haka at the blessing), the Daughters of Our Lady of Compassion, and the Anglican Church of Aotearoa.

Msgr Tonks told the gathering about a grapevine outside Auckland's St Patrick's Cathedral believed to have come from a vine brought to New Zealand by Bishop Pompallier, first Bishop of Auckland. He stated: "The Outhwaites were an important 'vine' in the early church in Auckland" and "we remember what the family gave us".

In 2015, St Peter's College completed a 12-classroom block on Mountain Rd named the "Outhwaite Building" in memory of the Outhwaite family.

== See also ==
- Mark Pirie (ed), "A Ladies Guide to Cricket", Tingling Catch (3 May 2013) (Retrieved 15 December 2014) (also contains some poems by William Outhwaite)
- "A visit to a pocket volcano" Timespanner: a visit through Avondale, Auckland and New Zealand history, 25 December 2010 (Retrieved 13 December 2014)

== Main sources ==
generally by date published.

- W G Cowie, Our Last Year in New Zealand 1887, Keegan, Paul Trench and Co., London, 1888.
- Thomas Outhwaite, The Cyclopedia of New Zealand, The Cyclopedia Company Limited, Christchurch, 1902, Volume 2, p. 274.
- William Eugene Outhwaite, The Cyclopedia of New Zealand, The Cyclopedia Company Limited, Christchurch, 1902, Volume 2, p. 281.
- Isa Outhwaite, New Zealand Herald, Monday, 14 December 1925, p. 12.
- C. P. Hutchison Q.C., Some Founding Fathers of Practice, from Robin Cooke Q.C., Portrait of a Profession, The Centennial Book of the New Zealand Law Society, Reed, Wellington, 1969, pp. 206 and 207.
- Una Platts, The Lively Capital, Auckland 1840–1865, Avon, Christchurch, 1971, p. 48.
- Pat Gallager, The Marist Brothers in New Zealand Fiji & Samoa 1876–1976, New Zealand Marist Brothers' Trust Board, Tuakau, 1976, pp. 96–97.
- Una Platts, Nineteenth Century New Zealand Artists, Avon, Christchurch, 1980, pp. 186 and 187.
- E R Simmons, In Crucis Salus: A History of the Diocese of Auckland 1848–1980, Catholic Publications Centre, Auckland, 1982
- Bronwyn Dalley, Following the rules? Women's responses to incarceration, New Zealand, 1880–1920, Journal of Social History, Winter, 1993, pp. 318 and 319.
- Jessie Munro, The Story of Suzanne Aubert, Auckland University Press, Auckland 1996, especially pp. 350–365
- Jill Williamson, E E Burton and Dorothy Gardiner, Outhwaite Connections, Auckland Historical Journal, April 1997, No 69, pp. 21–26: comments on the oldest son of the family, Charles Thomas Outhwaite and his brief association with the legal profession, and on the history of their property in Park Road and which is now Outhwaite Park.
- Dinah Holman, Newmarket Lost and Found, The Bush Press of New Zealand, Auckland, 2001, pp. 60–62.
- Adrienne Simpson, Hallelujahs & History: Auckland Choral 1855–2005, Auckland Choral, Auckland, 2005.
- John Stacpoole, Sailing to Bohemia: A life of the Honourable William Swainson, Puriri Press, Auckland, 2007.
- Richard Dunleavy, FMS, "Cardinal Newman and his links to Pompallier and New Zealand", NZ Catholic, 14–20 Dec. 2008, p. 5.
- Jessie Munro (ed) (with the assistance of Sister Bernadette Wrack), Letters on the Go: The Correspondence of Suzanne Aubert, Bridget Williams Books, Wellington, 2009.
- Mark Pirie, Ladies Guide to cricket by a lover of both c.1883 (an account of its presumed author W.E. Outhwaite (1847–1900), a 19th century Auckland theatre critic, poet and barrister), Cultural and Political Booklets, Wellington, 2013
