= Grafton Gully =

Gully in Auckland Region, New Zealand

Coordinates: 36.858712°S 174.766678°E

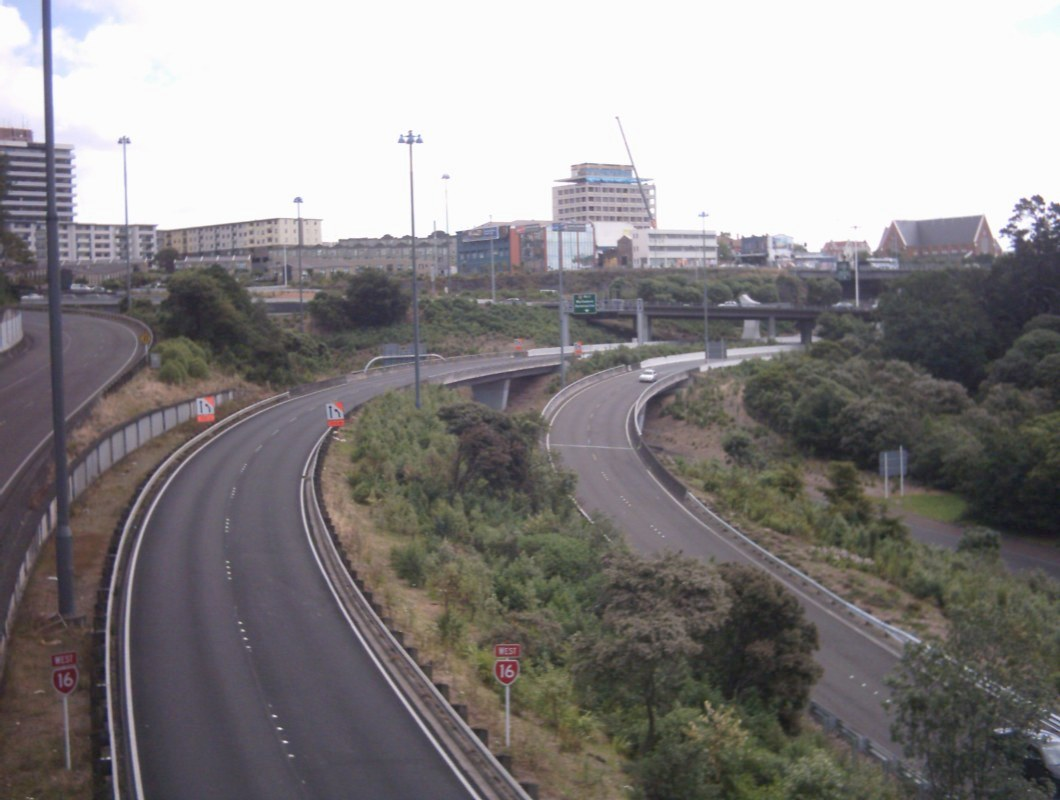
Grafton Gully as seen looking southwards from Grafton Bridge, with several motorways visible.

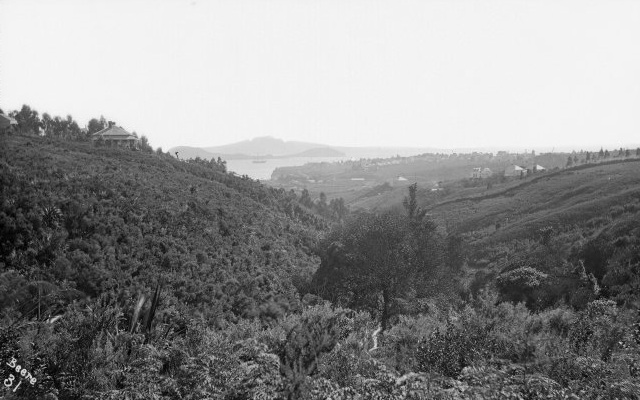
Grafton Gully looking northwards in 1863.

Grafton Gully is a deep (about 50 m) and very wide (about 100 m) gully running northwards towards the sea through the volcanic hills of the Auckland volcanic field in New Zealand. It divides the CBD from the suburbs of Grafton and Parnell in the east.

== History ==
The Grafton Gully was formerly home to the Waipārūrū Stream, known to early European settlers as the Graveyard Spring.

One of early Governors of New Zealand was Robert FitzRoy, whose grandfather was the third Duke of Grafton. The suburb that developed next to the Government Domain and Hospital was called Grafton. Eventually the adjoining gully became known as Grafton Gully although many people continued to call it Cemetery Gully for some years.

Grafton Gully is crossed by Grafton Bridge near its south end. Symonds Street Cemetery lies on its western slope.

== Usage ==
The gully is of the few areas in central Auckland that has not been claimed by buildings or for recreation (mostly due to the steepness of its sides), though prior to the construction of the motorway part of the gully was occupied by the Blandford Park sports facility until the mid-1960s.

Large parts of the gully are still mostly covered with bush, though the bottom of the gully carries multiple motorway lanes of State Highways 16 into the city further north (such as to Ports of Auckland). SH16 (Stanley Street) carried an average of 34,000 vehicles per day in 2003.

The Grafton Gully motorway project included two stages (with a third planned for when future traffic reaches trigger levels) and was built for NZ$68 million during 2001–2003.

In 2014 the Grafton Gully Cycleway was opened through the gully to Beach Road with links to the University of Auckland campus areas in the eastern Auckland CBD.

== See also ==
- Grafton Bridge
