= Central Connector =

Bus corridor in central Auckland, New Zealand

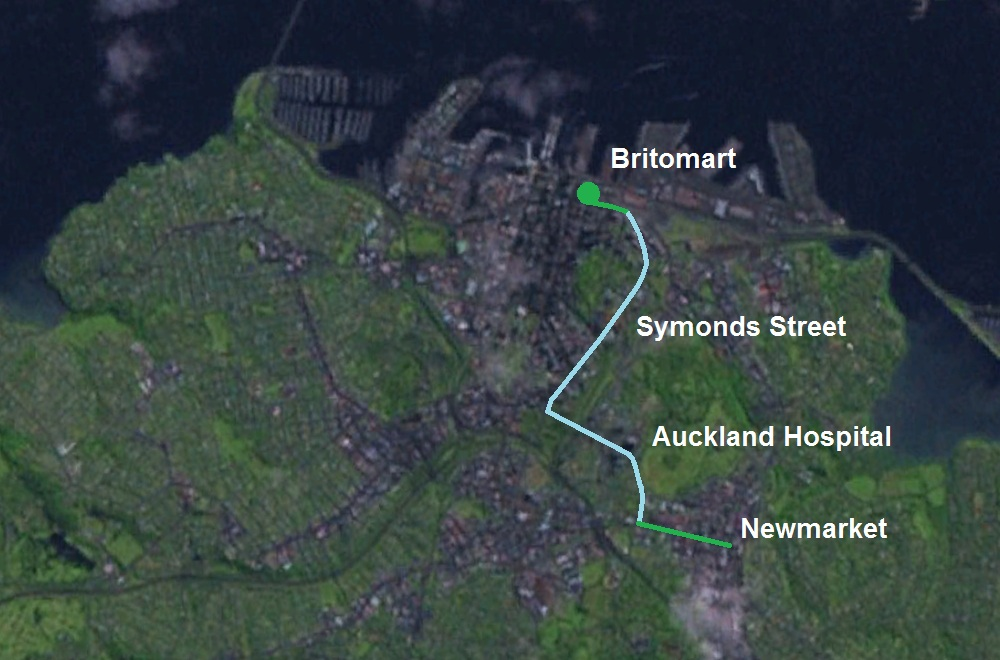
The route of the Central Connector. The light blue section shows the area of major street upgrades that occurred as part of the project.

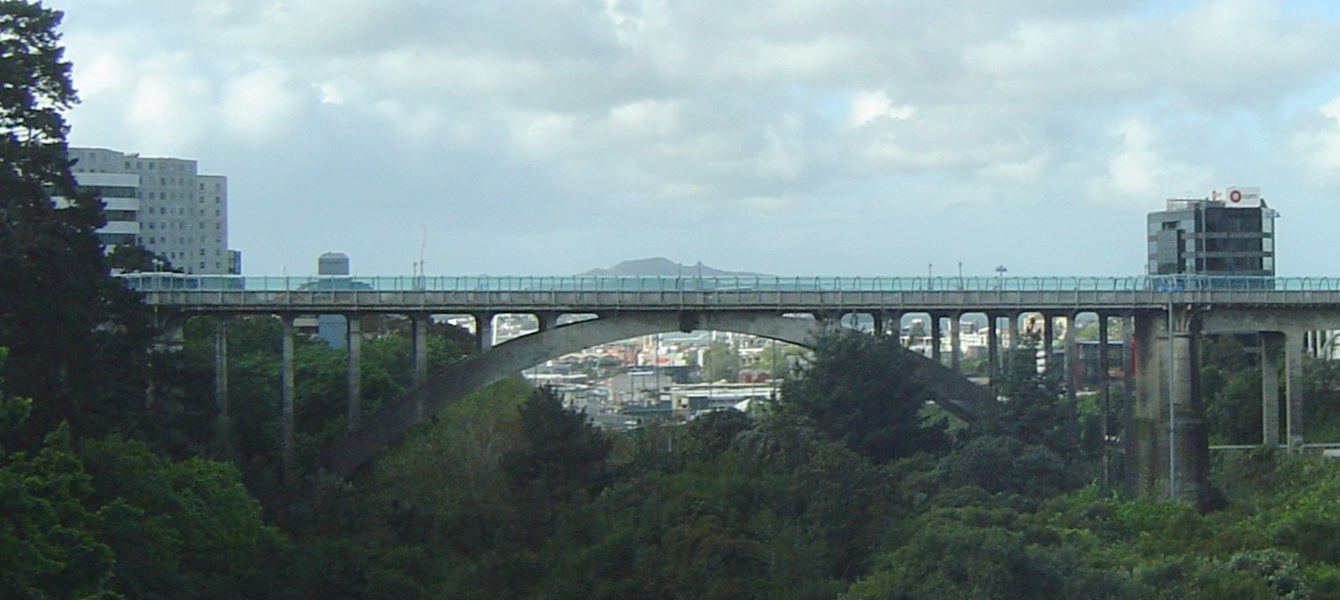
Grafton Bridge, which is part of the main public transport connection between the Auckland CBD and Newmarket and many eastern/southeastern suburbs.

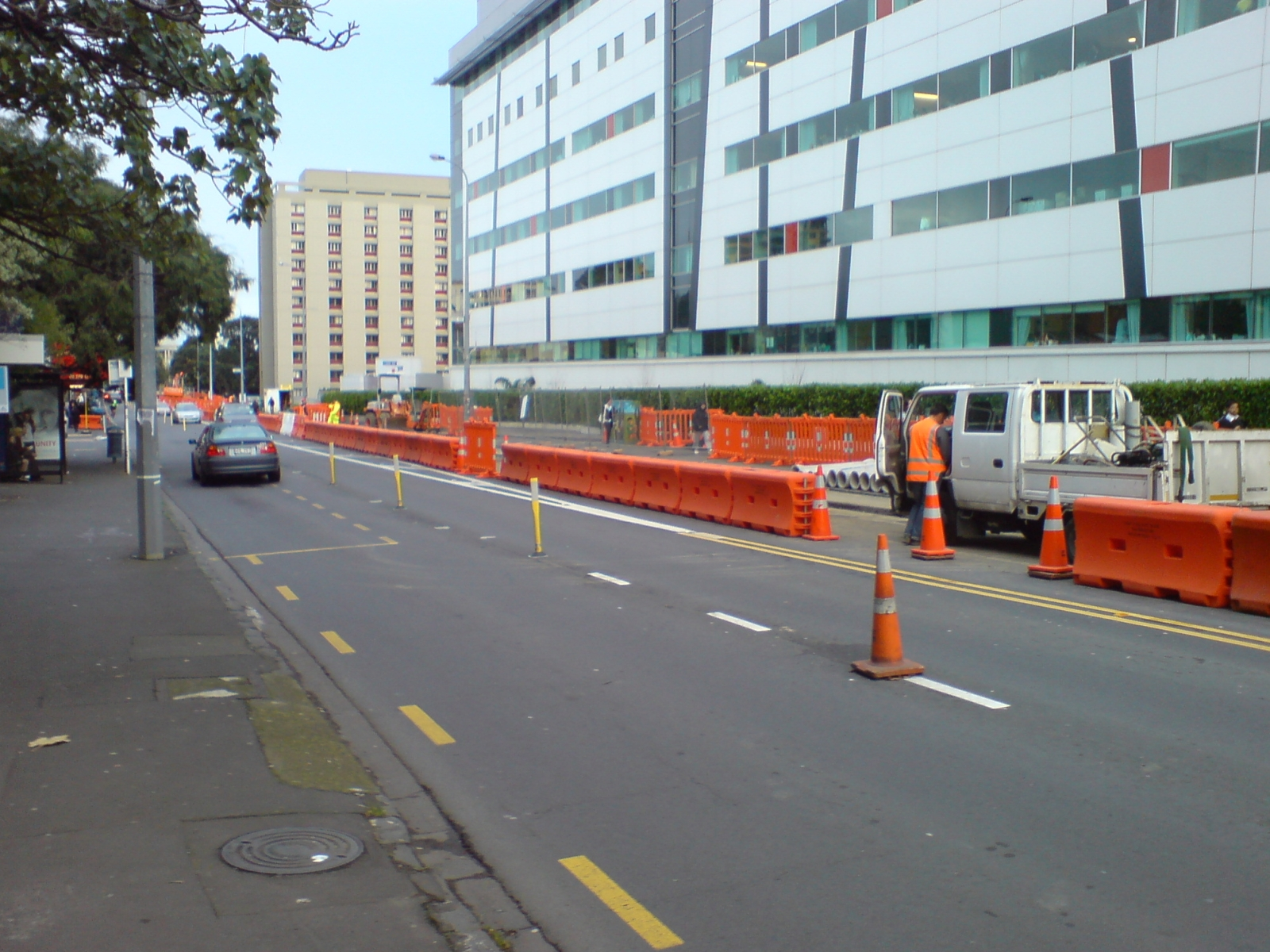
Preparatory work during the construction period outside Auckland Hospital in July 2008 (as roads are only rarely reconstructed, underground services were also upgraded as part of the project).

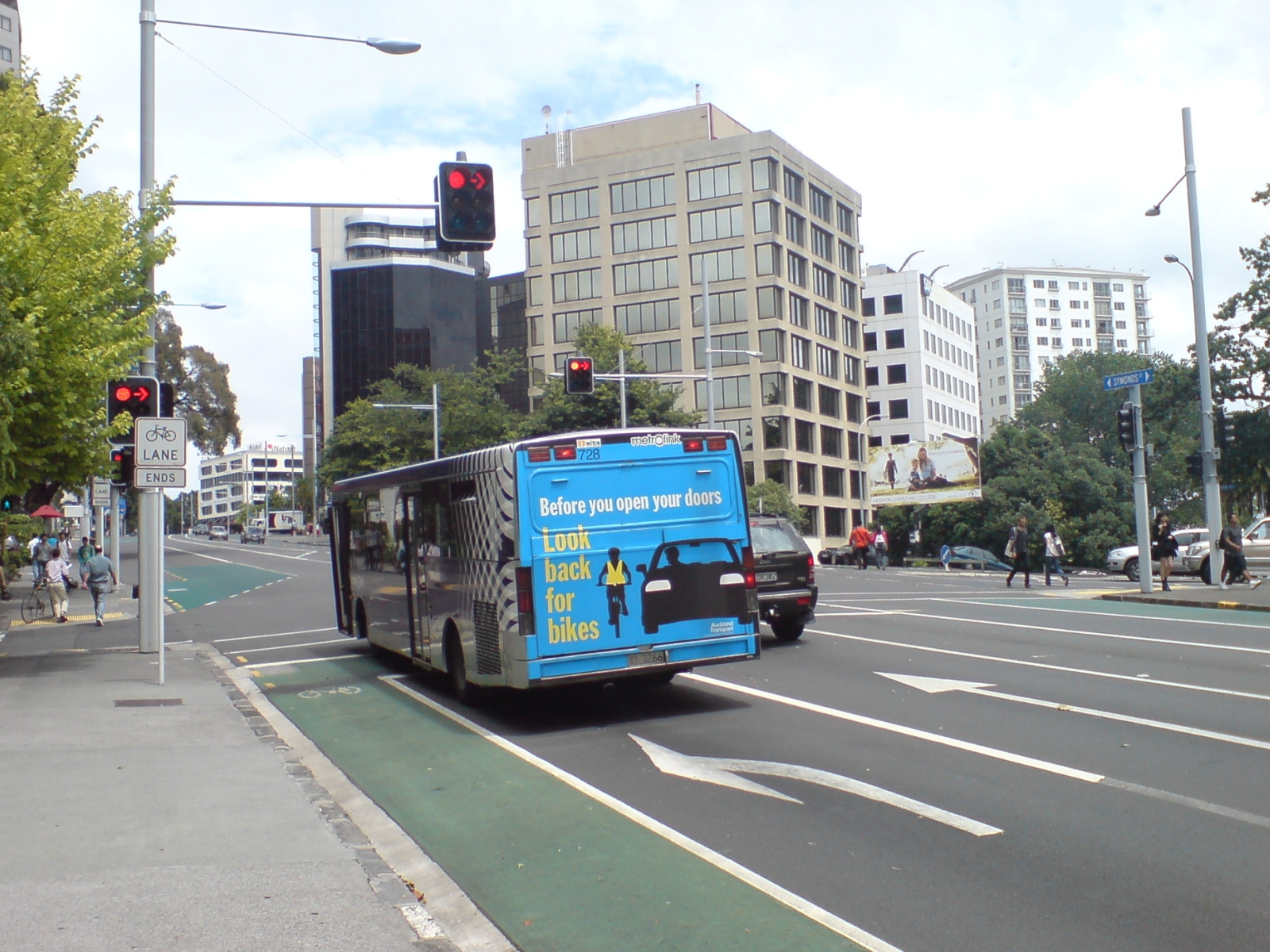
A bus on Symonds Street, after the upgrade.

The Central Connector (formerly called Auckland Central Transit Corridor), is a bus route. between Britomart Transport Centre in the Auckland CBD, New Zealand, and the commercial suburb of Newmarket. It has some aspects of a bus rapid transit link. It was expected to improve journey times by about 14 minutes for around 2,600 buses per week, about 65,000 passengers daily. Work began in April 2008.

In November 2007 John Banks, the Mayor of Auckland City, ordered a review of the project as part of his promised crackdown on rate increases. It was decided to go forward with the project, in part due to it being expected to cost Auckland City (according to late 2007 estimates) only NZ$8.5 million, with Land Transport New Zealand paying $20.5 million in addition to Auckland Regional Transport Authority's (ARTA) $13.7 million share. Banks' first Council, before its 2004 defeat by Dick Hubbard, had also first mooted the project to replace the tramway that was planned under Christine Fletcher's council but cancelled under Banks'.

== Characteristics ==
The route runs from Britomart via Symonds Street to Karangahape Road then over Grafton Bridge to Khyber Pass Road in Newmarket. It passes through Auckland University's City Campus on Symonds Street and past Auckland University of Technology's City Campus on Wellesley Street East, Auckland City Hospital, Auckland University's Grafton Campus, Auckland Domain, and Grafton Railway Station.

Grafton Bridge is closed to private vehicle traffic during the day, creating a bus lane in each direction between 7am-7pm. This part of the project was reviewed after protests by councillor Ken Baguely. However, part-funding for the project by ARTA had been contingent on those operating hours.

Most of the streets en route received substantial overhauls, with, for example, relaid footpaths. Ten pedestrian crossings were to be improved and enlarged, especially around the university. The changes included the closure of Alfred Street, a side street off Symonds Street bisecting the university campus in that area, to all traffic except Link and City Circuit buses from the end of 2006, and new canopies over footpaths in the university areas.
