= Grafton, New Zealand =

Suburb of Auckland

Grafton
- Suburb
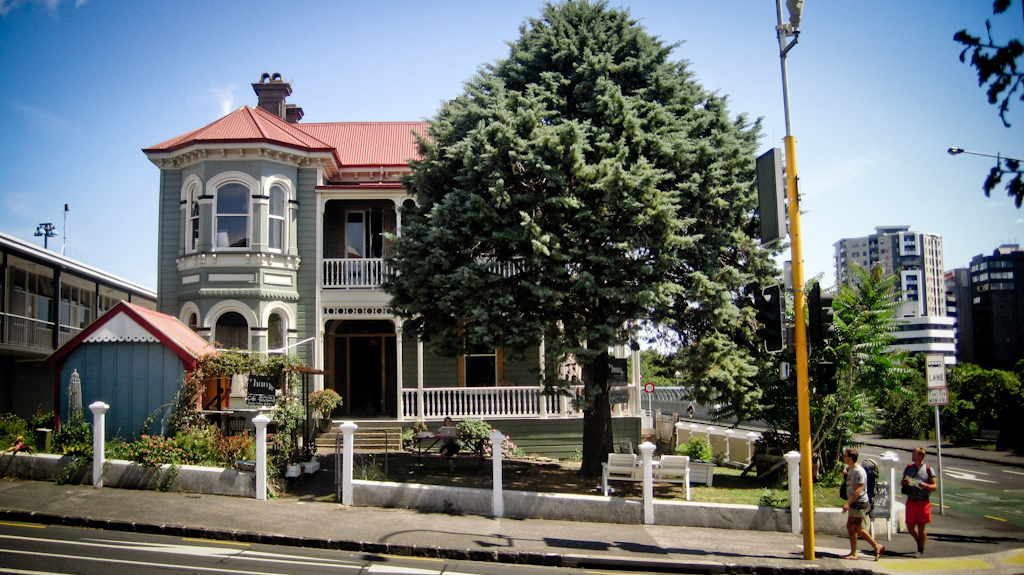
- Hum Salon operating at the Basley-Bush House / Rothesay at 123 Grafton Road, February 2015
- Interactive map of Grafton
- Coordinates: 36.8604°S 174.7669°E
- Country: New Zealand
- City: Auckland
- Local authority: Auckland Council
- Electoral ward: Ōrākei ward
- Local board: Waitematā Local Board

Area
  - Land: 87 ha (210 acres)

Population (June 2025)
  - Total: 3,520
  - Density: 4,000/km^{2} (10,000/sq mi)
- Train stations: Grafton Railway Station
- Hospitals: Auckland City Hospital, Starship Hospital

Auckland CBD	Parnell	(Auckland Domain)
Auckland CBD	Grafton	Newmarket
Newton	Eden Terrace, Mount Eden	Epsom

Grafton is a suburb of Auckland, New Zealand. The suburb is named for the Duke of Grafton, a patron of the first Governor of New Zealand, William Hobson, and the grandfather of a subsequent Governor, Robert FitzRoy.

== History ==
The Khyber Pass Road District was formed on 31 December 1867 to administer the area. In 1868, the road district renamed to Grafton Road Highway District and started operation 9 September 1868. In 1882 the road district was annexed by the City of Auckland.

== Description ==
The suburb is characterised by its many historic buildings, many of them essentially unchanged from the early decades of the 20th century. While the extents of the suburb have shrunk with the motorway and arterial road construction of the middle 20th century, the remaining smaller suburb thus has a highly cohesive structure, which is recognised, for example, in the residential zoning which discourages demolition of existing buildings.

Grafton has a local resident's association, abbreviated as the GRA. The menswear fashion brand and retail chain Barkers has its head office in Grafton.

== Demographics ==
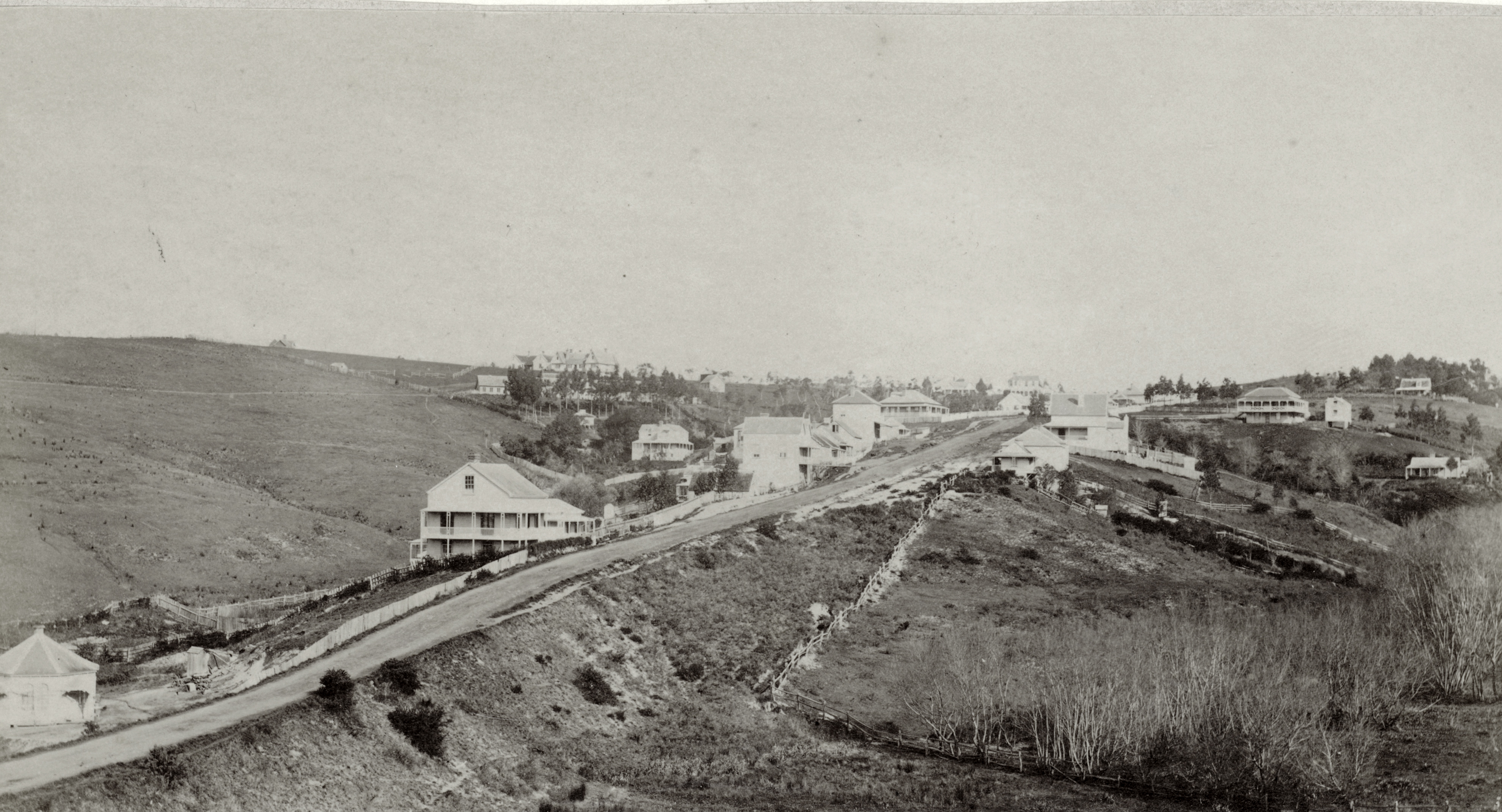
Grafton Road, Auckland, New Zealand, c. 1869

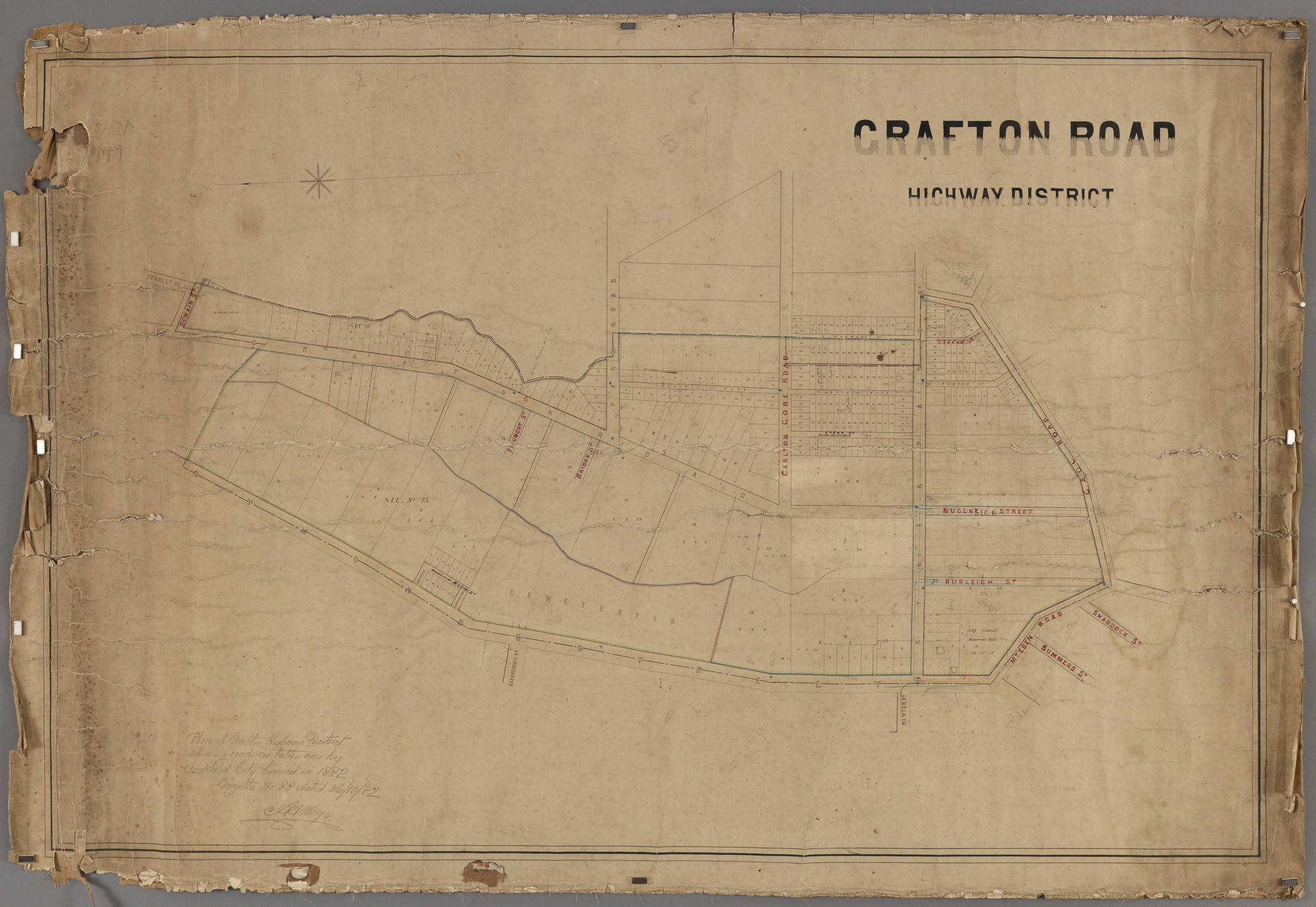
Map of Grafton Road Highway District 1882

Grafton covers 0.87 km^{2} (0.34 sq mi) and had an estimated population of 3,520 as of June 2025, with a population density of 4,046 people per km^{2}.

Historical population
Year	Pop.	±% p.a.
2006	1,722	—
2013	2,805	+7.22%
2018	2,580	−1.66%
2023	3,111	+3.81%
The 2006 population is for a smaller area of 0.64 km^{2}. Source:

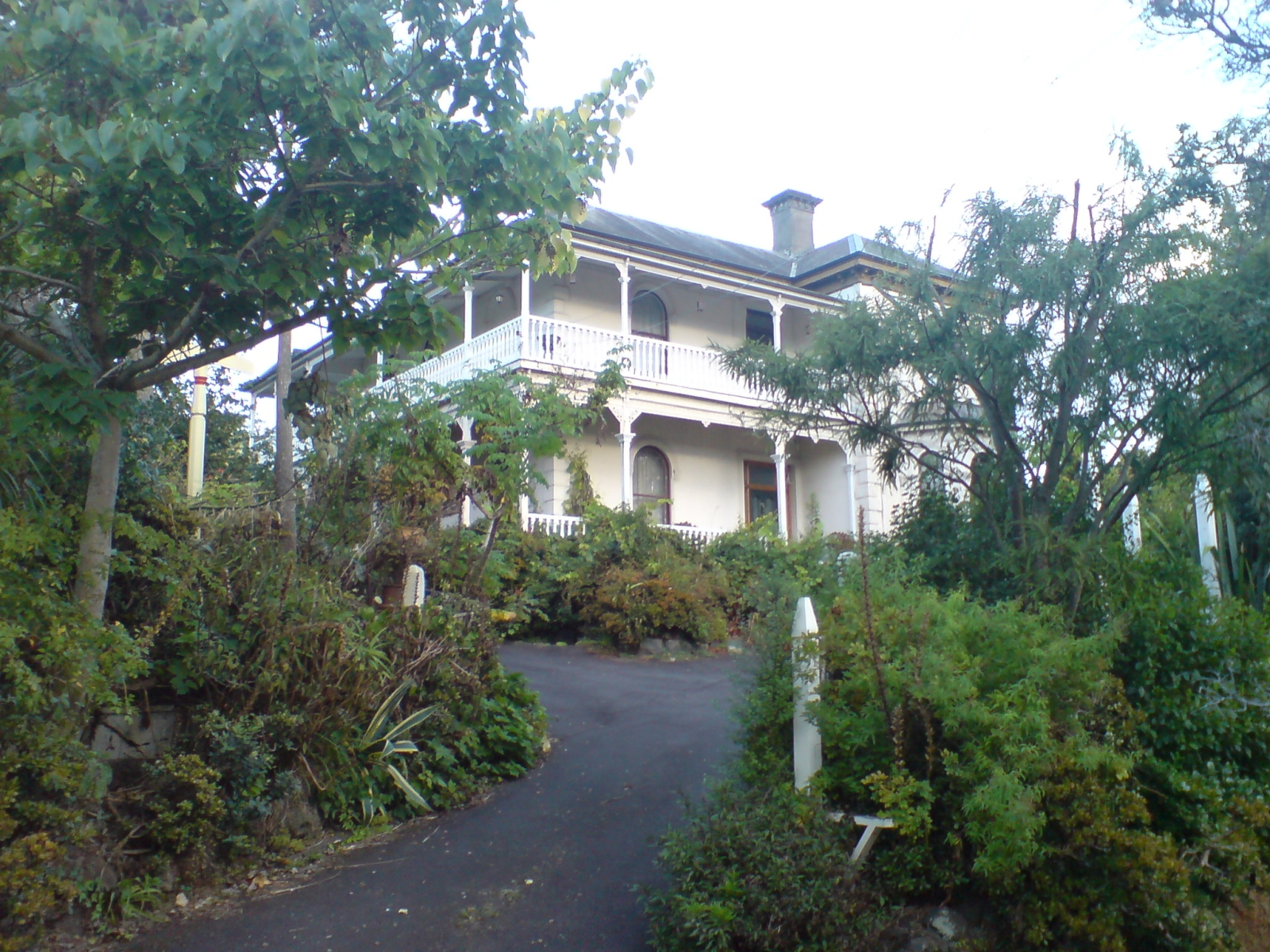
One of the many historic houses in Grafton.

Grafton had a population of 3,111 in the 2023 New Zealand census, an increase of 531 people (20.6%) since the 2018 census, and an increase of 306 people (10.9%) since the 2013 census. There were 1,512 males, 1,575 females and 24 people of other genders in 1,239 dwellings. 11.2% of people identified as LGBTIQ+. The median age was 31.6 years (compared with 38.1 years nationally). There were 186 people (6.0%) aged under 15 years, 1,215 (39.1%) aged 15 to 29, 1,446 (46.5%) aged 30 to 64, and 261 (8.4%) aged 65 or older.

People could identify as more than one ethnicity. The results were 53.4% European (Pākehā); 7.5% Māori; 5.0% Pasifika; 38.8% Asian; 5.6% Middle Eastern, Latin American and African New Zealanders (MELAA); and 1.4% other, which includes people giving their ethnicity as "New Zealander". English was spoken by 96.0%, Māori language by 2.0%, Samoan by 1.0%, and other languages by 37.9%. No language could be spoken by 1.1% (e.g. too young to talk). New Zealand Sign Language was known by 0.3%. The percentage of people born overseas was 53.1, compared with 28.8% nationally.

Religious affiliations were 28.8% Christian, 4.2% Hindu, 2.3% Islam, 0.4% Māori religious beliefs, 2.5% Buddhist, 0.3% New Age, 0.2% Jewish, and 1.7% other religions. People who answered that they had no religion were 55.1%, and 4.6% of people did not answer the census question.

Of those at least 15 years old, 1,515 (51.8%) people had a bachelor's or higher degree, 957 (32.7%) had a post-high school certificate or diploma, and 450 (15.4%) people exclusively held high school qualifications. The median income was $52,000, compared with $41,500 nationally. 573 people (19.6%) earned over $100,000 compared to 12.1% nationally. The employment status of those at least 15 was that 1,677 (57.3%) people were employed full-time, 372 (12.7%) were part-time, and 123 (4.2%) were unemployed.

Individual statistical areas
Name	Area (km^{2})	Population	Density (per km^{2})	Dwellings	Median age	Median income
Grafton West	0.25	1,332	5,328	690	32.4 years	$66,200
Grafton	0.62	1,779	2,869	549	30.7 years	$39,400
New Zealand					38.1 years	$41,500

== Education ==
St Peter's College is a state-integrated Catholic boys' secondary (years 7–13) school with a roll of 1,318 as of July 2026.

== Landmarks ==
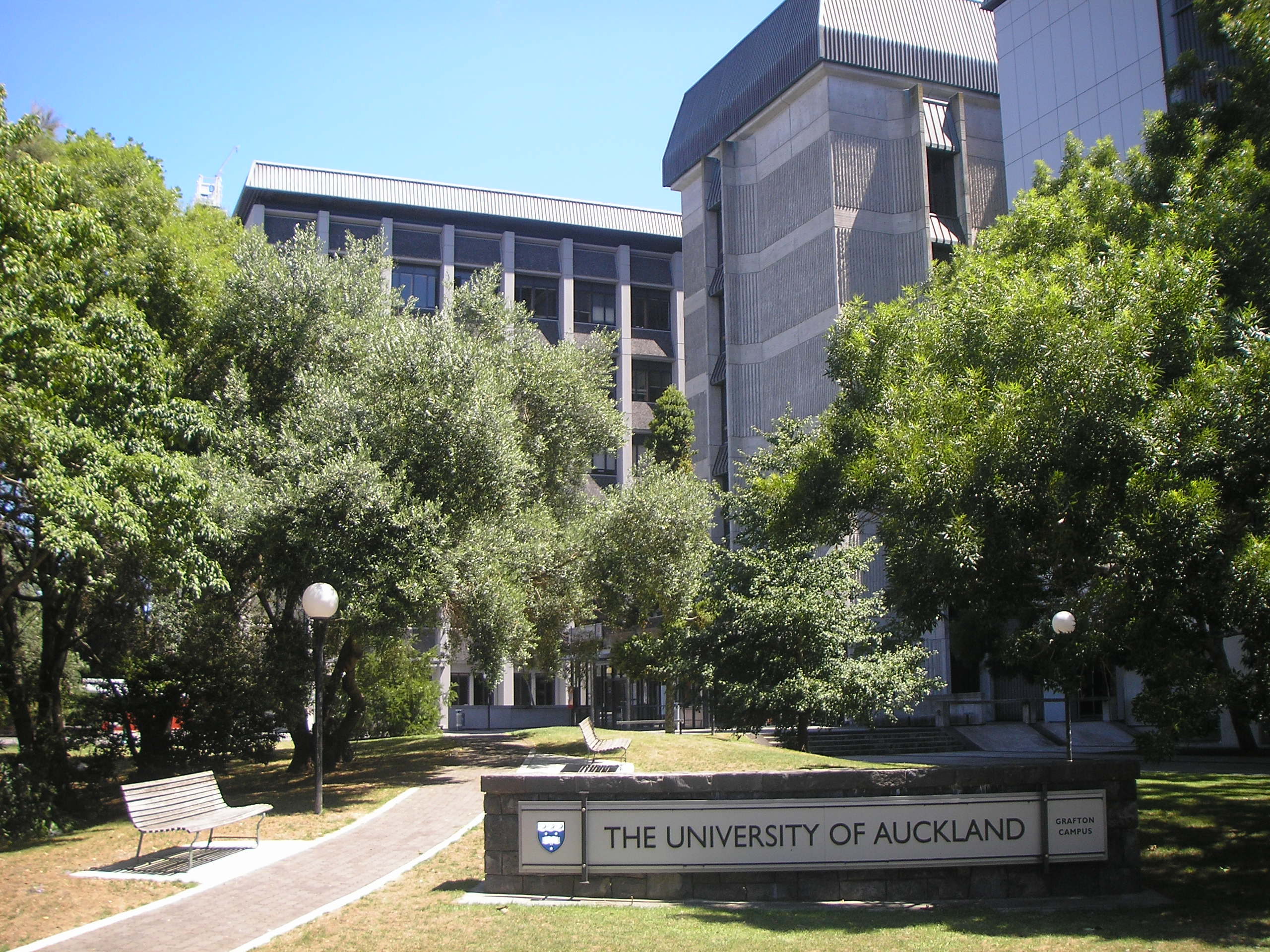
The Medical School of Auckland University and two large hospitals bound the north side.

- Grafton Bridge: Spanning Grafton Gully and connecting the Auckland CBD with Grafton and parts further east this was the largest piece of Civil Engineering in New Zealand. When it was completed in 1910 it was the largest reinforced concrete arched bridge in the world, spanning almost 300 metres.
- Basley-Bush House (aka. Rothesay Private Hotel), 123 Grafton Road, was built c. 1882 for George William Basley (1846–1919), Mayor of Parnell 1906–1909. Featuring Italianate design to the windows and detailing of the building, with its distinctive faceted pyramidal roof bay, ornate chimneys and modillions it is the sole remnant of the Victorian-Edwardian era on Grafton Road. During and after the construction of Grafton Bridge in 1908–1910 the house was the residence of the City Engineer Walter Ernest Bush who was supervising the completion of the bridge. After being derelict for many years, the house has been recently restored from its decrepit state by Falling Apple Charitable Trust volunteers and currently operates as a café, art gallery and salon, namely Hum Salon.
- Auckland City Hospital: As early as 1842 this area was seen as an ideal spot for the colony's hospital; a sunny, north facing location a short distance from town but fairly isolated should there be an epidemic of any kind. The first buildings of the 1850s and 1860s were wooden and have long disappeared. The main building was designed by Philip Herapath in 1878 in the Italianate style. It was demolished in the early 1960s and replaced by a 10-story modernist block which still stands on the hill. In the 1880s and 1890s new brick buildings of some size were built including the Costley block (now demolished) which was the legency of local benefactor Edward Costley. Close by are several other specialist blocks from before and after the first world war. In 2003, a new hospital was completed adjacent to the existing one. This new hospital amalgamated services of the old hospital's Acute Adult care, as well as Green Lane Hospital's Cardiothoracic services and National Women's Obstetric, Gynaecological and Neonatal services. Acute Paediatric services are delivered by the adjoining Starship Children's Hospital. By bringing all these services on to one campus, Auckland City Hospital gained the status of being the largest hospital in New Zealand.
- Huia Lodge – cnr Grafton and Park Road. In the 1960s a highrise Nurses residence replaced an Edwardian Mansion retaining several of the trees on the property.
- Auckland Medical School buildings. Designed in the brutalist style by (Stevenson & Turner architects) this complex dates from 1967 and is connected to the hospital by a pedestrian tunnel under the road. This is part of the Grafton Campus: The Medical School of the University of Auckland.
- Ernest Adams House – 72 Seafield View Road. Small 19th century cottage. The founder of the Baking Empire lived here. Note that although this end of the street is geographically closer to the central Post Office and the harbour the street numbering actually starts at the far end of the street. This is probably because Khyber Pass Road was created in the 1860s and Grafton Bridge only in the 1880s.
- Grafton Hall of Residence. Seafield View Road. 1971 high rise building built as ecumenical student Accommodation.
- Auckland Domain: This park, set aside by Governor William Hobson in the 1840s as a public domain, is one of the city's greatest assets. The Auckland War Memorial Museum and Cenotaph are perhaps its most dominant features.
- The Elliot Memorial Entrance Gates: These gates form the entrance to the Auckland Domain and are a fine example of the Art Deco style. William Elliot (1864–1934) was an Auckland businessman who was Chairman of the 1913 Auckland Exhibition, which was located in the Auckland Domain. The exhibition made a profit which was used to pay for the Wintergardens. Elliot donated marble statuary for the domain and the funds for these gates. Designed by Gummer and Ford architects, the structure is surmounted by a fine nude male bronze by Richard Gross. The model was Alan Elliot (no relation to the patron) who had been a New Zealand medalist at the 1932 Olympics in Los Angeles.
- St Arvans. Cnr Carlton Gore Road and Park Road. Impressive wooden Edwardian mansion with distinctive turret. Built in 1910 as the home of Dr Arthur Challinor Purchas. Now run as a Backpackers.
- Huntly House – 16 Huntly Avenue. 19th century Italianate Masonry mansion built in 1876 for Francis White who married Charlotte, daughter of wealthy merchant & land owner C.J. Stone of Mount Albert who was reputably the first white baby born in New Zealand.
- La Roche Villa – cnr Glasgow Terrace. Brick villa designed by and built for Charles August La Roche in 1907. The red brick surfaces are not real bricks, the house is actually built of cheaper pale mottled brown bricks and then covered with red cement stucco with fake mortar lines. This was a fairly common practice in Auckland at the time as it gives the impression that the building is constructed of expensive imported red bricks from Britain at a fraction of the price.
- Grafton Mews 5 Glasgow Terrace. A striking 1970s development of hexagonal town houses. Built on the site of a Victorian house which was the location of the first drug raid in NZ concerning LSD.
- 16 Carlton Gore Road. Until the 1980s this operated as a corner shop. In the 1940s this was the childhood home of Max Gimlett the NZ painter. For a while in the 1990s Don Binney, another NZ painter rented the former shop space as a studio.
- Outhwaite Park lies on the corner of Park Road and Carlton-Gore Road. This was the residence of Auckland's first Registrar of the Supreme Court, Thomas Outhwaite. From the 1840s onwards Outhwaite and his French wife Louise established a beautiful garden with many interesting specimen plants. In 1927 the last of their four children gave this land to the city as a park. The house does not survive but the basic layout of the grounds and many of the mature trees date from the Outhwaite family's time. The park gives an expansive view of Maungawhau / Mount Eden to the south with a view opposite of St Peter's College prominent on former Outhwaite land on its lower slopes.
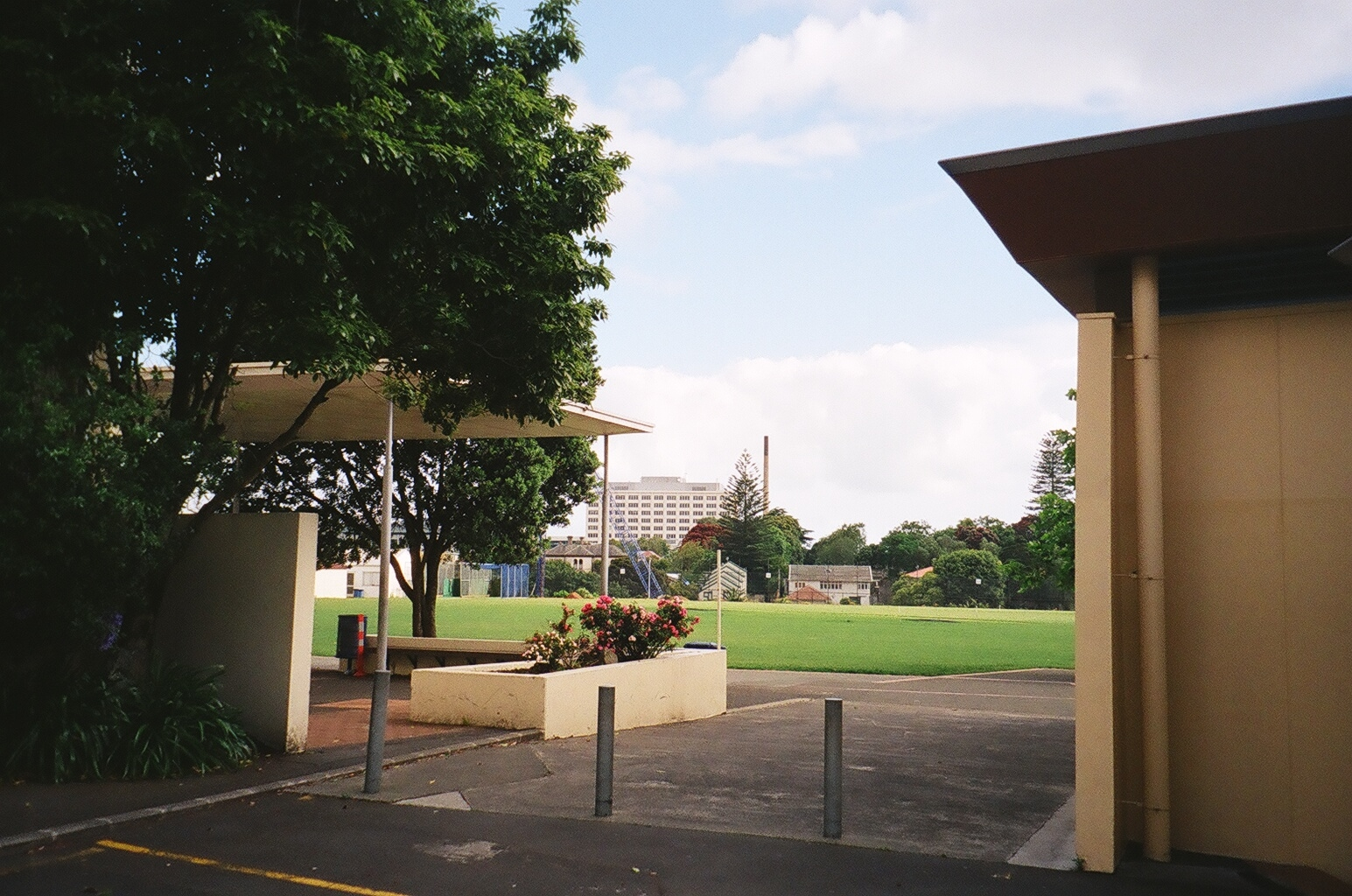
  St Peter's College cricket field (St Peter's Oval), Grafton, particularly Auckland City Hospital and Outhwaite Park (2009)
- St Peter's College and Christian Brothers House, 1939–1944, designed by William Henry Gummer, architect, extant; located on the other side of Khyber Pass Road from Outwaite Park. This Catholic Boys School is located on land especially gifted by the Outhwaite family.
- Former Trinity Methodist Theological College – 140 Grafton Road, cnr Carlton Gore Road. The Oamaru stone and brick building in the Collegiate Gothic style was opened in 1929 replacing earlier buildings. Built between 1926 and 1928 to the designs of James Hodge White (1896–1970) and Leslie Douglas Coombes who had designed similar style buildings for the University of Otago. In 1972 the college moved to Meadowbank in Auckland and the building was occupied by educational institutions including the Auckland Technical Institute and the Whitecliffe College of Arts and Design. The Church of Scientology bought the building in 2007, restoring it and opening it as their Auckland headquarters in 2017.
- Phoenix Gardens 135 Grafton Road. Highrise Apartment block built in the 1990s.
- In 1861 the Auckland Bowling Club in Stanley Street was established, with its fields in the Auckland Domain. This club still exists and was the first bowling club established in New Zealand.
- In 2011 Geologists located a 'forgotten volcano', Grafton Volcano, under the suburb. While it had long been known that the nearby Auckland Domain is a volcanic crater [approximately 50,000 years old], it is now apparent that most of the area on which the suburb of Grafton sits was on a slightly older volcanic crater, obscured by the later eruptions of the Domain Volcano.

== Notable residents ==
During the late 1840s Chief Pōtatau Te Wherowhero resided in the Auckland Domain in a house provided for him by the Government, this house was located north of the Domain Ponds, between the hospital and the southern entrance of what is now called Centennial Walk. Here he was visited by the then Governor, George Grey.

Gustavus von Tempsky (1828–1868) lived on Grafton Road in the early 1860s.

The early settler Outhwaite family resided in their Grafton house for nearly eighty five years.

Noted aviator Jean Batten stayed with her brother when he lived in Seafield View road during the 1930s (house demolished around 2006).

The painter Max Gimblett's family lived in Grafton in the 1940s and ran the shop on the corner of Carlton Gore and Seafield View Roads. In the 1990s the painter Don Binney rented the same shop as a studio space.

Pauline Kumeroa Kingi CNZM is a notable current resident.
