= Newmarket, New Zealand =

Newmarket
- Suburb
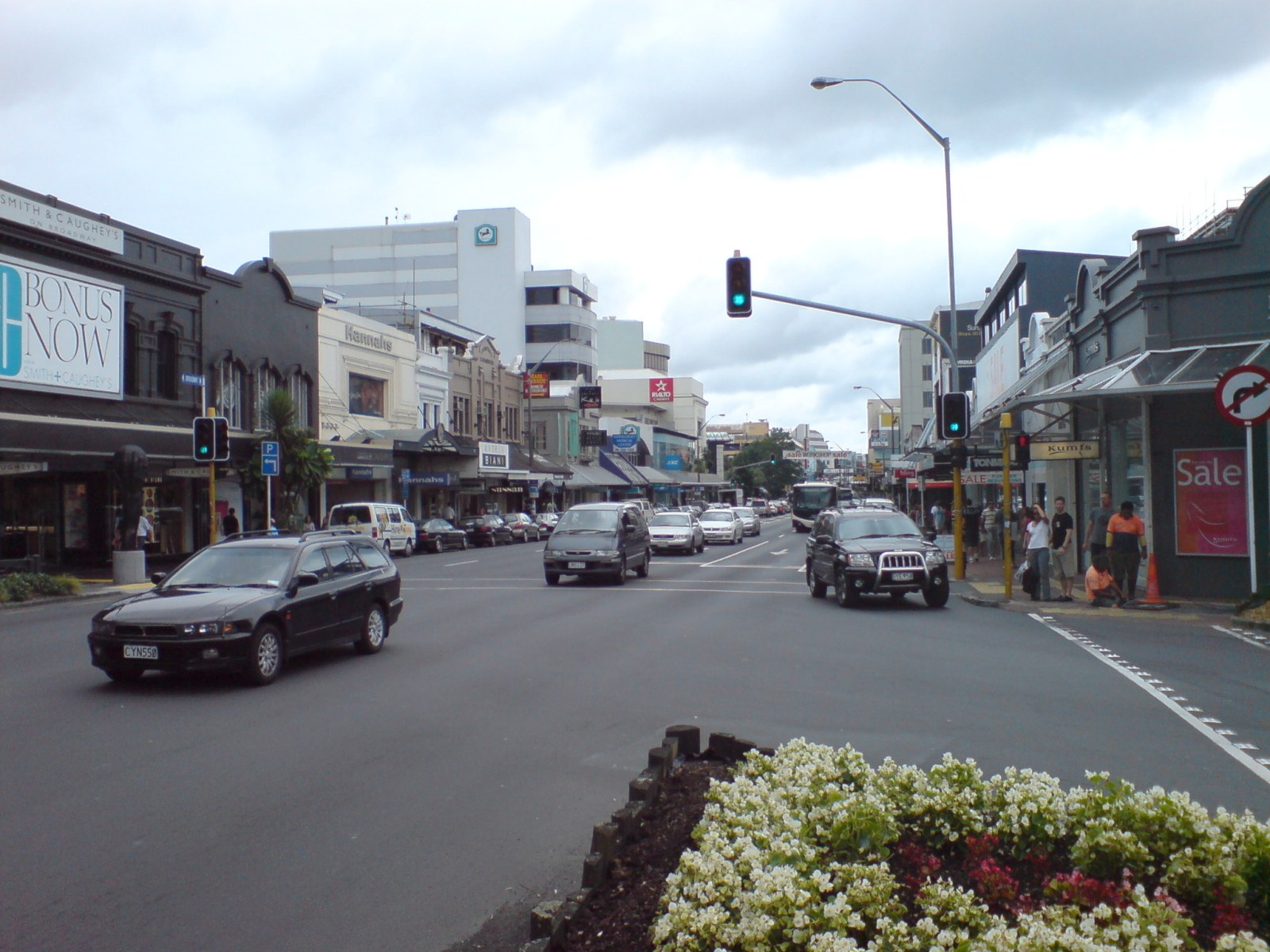
- Broadway, the main street of Newmarket.
- Interactive map of Newmarket
- Coordinates: 36.869862°S 174.777578°E
- Country: New Zealand
- City: Auckland
- Local authority: Auckland Council
- Electoral ward: Ōrākei ward
- Local board: Waitematā Local Board
- Established: 1840s

Area
  - Land: 85 ha (210 acres)

Population (June 2025)
  - Total: 2,910
  - Density: 3,400/km^{2} (8,900/sq mi)
- Train stations: Newmarket railway station

| (Auckland Domain) | Parnell | Newmarket Park |
| Grafton | Newmarket | Remuera |
| Mount Eden | Epsom | Remuera |

Newmarket (Māori: Te Tī Tūtahi) is a central Auckland suburb. Newmarket was originally an independent borough from 1885 to 1989, when it was abolished. Newmarket was established as a livestock market since the 1850s and grew to become a retail and commercial centre for Auckland, with the main road Broadway being the focal point of this activity.

== Etymology ==
The intersection at Remuera Road, Great South Road, and Manukau Road (Broadway) became a livestock market and was known as the 'new market', eventually becoming the name for the area as a whole. The Māori language name for the area is Te Ti Tutahi lit. 'the lone cabbage tree'.

== History ==
=== Māori beginnings ===
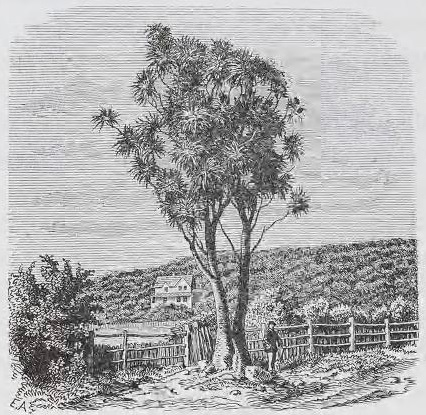
View of the single cabbage tree circa 1859/60

Tāmaki Māori called this area, particularly the south of the current Newmarket, Te Tī Tūtahi, 'the cabbage tree standing alone' or 'the cabbage tree of singular importance', referring to a tree which stood on the corner of Mortimer Pass and Broadway (according to other references at the corner of Clovernook Road and Broadway) until 1908. Some of the cabbage trees in the area are descended from this tree, after Alfred Buckland rescued a portion and replanted trees around Newmarket and as far away as Bucklands Beach.

In the general area of Nuffield Street / Mahuru Street, no remnants today are visible of the Mahuru Spring, once sacred to the local Māori iwi. It is noted that the spring was named after the Māori word for the season of spring.

=== European settlement ===
The earliest subdivision of land in this location took place in June 1841. In 1842 Epsom Road was formed, running from the bottom of town up through Parnell towards the middle of the Auckland isthmus. This was later called Manukau Road before being given its current name, Parnell Road. The position of Newmarket at the start of several major roads to the east and south, including Great South Road, was to strongly influence its character as a transport hub and "Gateway to the South".

In 1845 Khyber Pass Road was formed and the intersection of these three roads was called "Hobson's Bridge" referring to a small wooden bridge that crossed over "Hobson's Creek" (more or less where the railway track passes near the Olympic Swimming Pool). A very small bridge was the most noteworthy landmark of the area, giving some idea of the rather empty nature of the landscape.

The presence of the Newmarket railway station connecting it with Auckland, opened in 1873 after the completion of the first Parnell Tunnel, was also a great advantage. The market was located to the south of Remuera Road and east of Manukau Road.

Overlooking Newmarket on a bluff to the south east is a 19th-century wooden house in the Gothic style called Highwic. The home of a local businessman Alfred Buckland, Highwic is now owned by the Auckland Council and administered by Heritage New Zealand. Another piece of Auckland land owned by Alfred Buckland located further out of town is still called "Bucklands Beach".

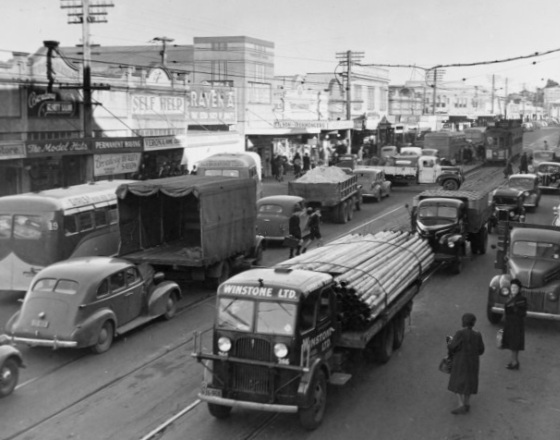
Newmarket's Broadway around 1950.

The main road of Newmarket is called Broadway. Originally Manukau Road, it was renamed Broadway in late 1912 by the Newmarket Borough Council to reflect the fact that it was no longer a muddy, dusty slushy street. The Broadway Cinema opened in 1911 as the Adelphi Theatre and changed its name in early 1915. The picture hall was a brick and corrugated iron shed linked by a passage to a retail block on Broadway. The cinema lasted until late 1925. Like its New York namesake, Newmarket's Broadway developed a rather bright 'Moderne' flashy image in the 1930s and 1940s and by the 1960s had the biggest collection of neon signs in the country.

The Newmarket Olympic Pool was constructed in 1939 to the designs of the borough engineer N. F. Alcock. This Art deco building was opened by the Minister of Internal Affairs, the Hon William Parry in 1940. As well as being the borough's only public amenity the Olympic sized swimming pool was a great asset for the whole of Auckland. Over the years it has been well used and facilitated the hosting of many sporting events by Auckland including the Empire Games in 1950. Recently the pool's streamline art deco form was considerably changed when a cinema complex was built over the pool, which was previously open to the sky. To the north of the Olympic Swimming Pools is the Olympic Park War Memorial.

Located to the south of the Olympic Pools is Lumsden Green. The Green occupies a triangle of land at the intersection of Parnell Road, Broadway and Khyber Pass which had been put aside as a reserve in 1878. The park is ornamented by a modernist fountain, a 19th-century cannon and a stainless steel sculpture by Marte Szirmay installed in 1969 to mark the centenary of the Newmarket Highway district. The park is named in honour of David Lumsden, the last mayor of Newmarket before amalgamation with Auckland City in 1989.

For much of the 20th century, most road traffic leaving or entering Auckland passed through Newmarket. Leading off Broadway is the beginning of Remuera Road which is the way to the eastern suburbs while further south Broadway splits into Great South Road and the secondary southern route, Manukau Road. The constant flow of traffic only added to Newmarket's fast, modern image and helped a great deal with its prosperity. Around 1966, between 25,000-30,000 cars used the street per day.

A significant change to the skyline was the Newmarket Viaduct erected in 1966 to take one of the early sections of the Southern Motorway over the railway and half a dozen streets. The new motorway system opened up the new industrial suburbs to the south such as Penrose, Mount Wellington etc. This resulted in much of the local industry moving out of Newmarket and along with it many of the working-class people who lived in modest houses in the surrounding streets.

Since the 1960s Newmarket has been largely a retail destination, although a certain amount of light industry still existed in the surrounding streets, the most significant of which is the brewing trade. Ever since the 1840s Newmarket has been the location of several breweries. Water falling on nearby Mount Eden emerges in several reliable springs in the Khyber Pass area. Flowing through large amounts of volcanic scoria it is very well filtered. The brewery buildings on Khyber Pass Road have recently (2014) been demolished, the land has been redeveloped as part of the University of Auckland.

In 1994, Burger King opened its first store in NZ on 80A Broadway (closed down in 2020).

=== Modern days ===
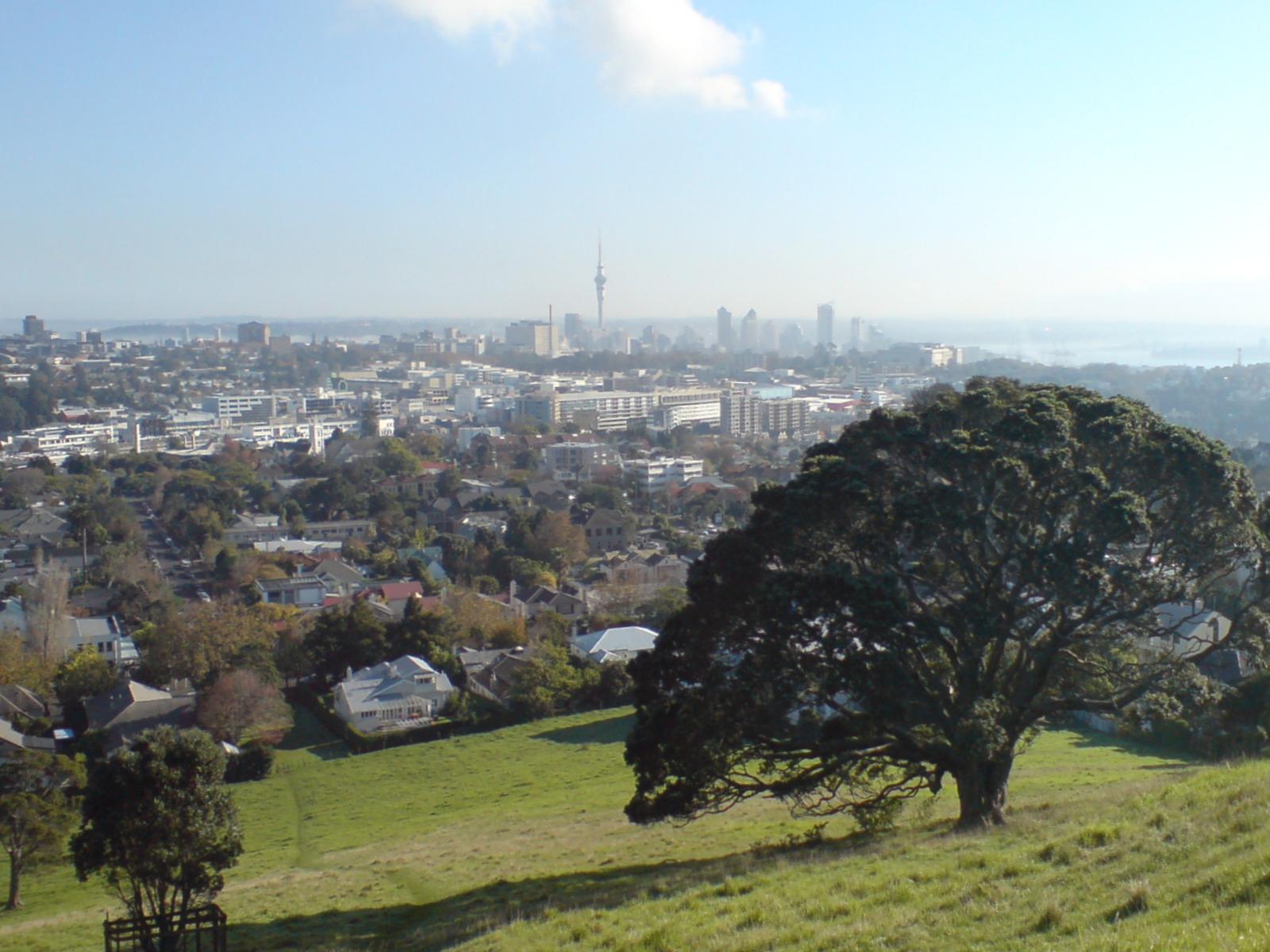
Newmarket from Ōhinerau / Mount Hobson looking northwest.

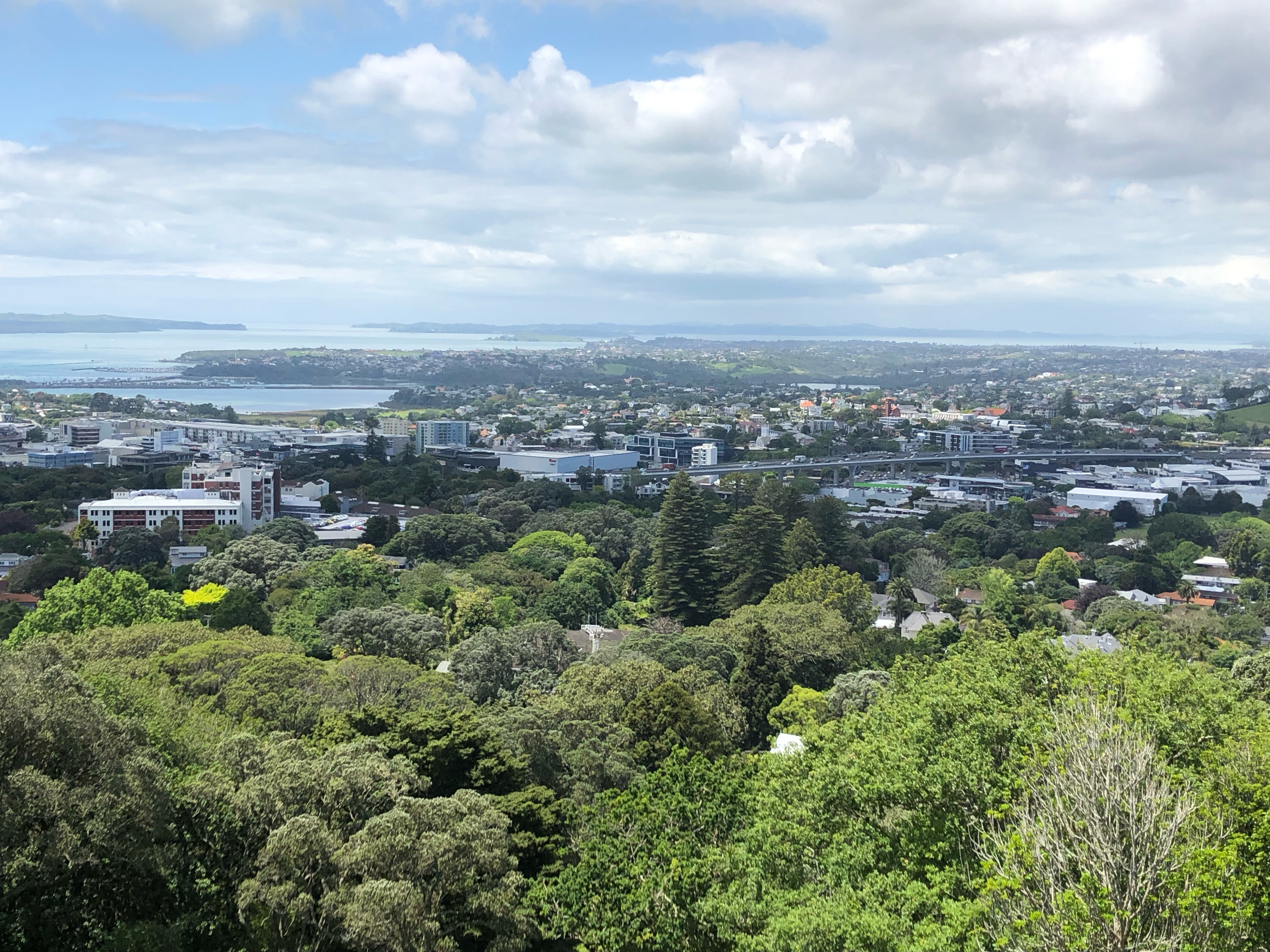
Newmarket from Maungawhau / Mount Eden looking northeast.

Newmarket has become one of New Zealand's most significant retail and hospitality destinations, and also a major entertainment hub. At the same time, the location on one of the major thoroughfares into and out of the city also led to increasing bottleneck issues, with some claiming during the middle of the 2000s that council was neglecting the area (though projects like the Central Connector have helped to alleviate this). Traffic gridlock was one of the reasons why a plan for a major new Westfield Group shopping centre near the railway line was hotly contested by the Newmarket Protection Society, a group composed mostly of residents and some local business owners. Partly due to these objections, Westfield abandoned the plans and instead bought the Two Double Seven shopping centre, now the Westfield Centre, which underwent major redevelopment and expansion during 2017-2020.

Traffic remains a major factor in the area, as Broadway carries over 40,000 vehicles a day, limiting the ability of pedestrians in the shopping district to cross the main road. An ambitious earlier plan from 2003 to construct a "road over rail" above the railway line, from the northwest end of Newmarket near Park Road, to the southeast near the St Marks Road interchange, did not go ahead, even though this could have significantly reduced vehicle traffic on Broadway. A late 2000s upgrade has however provided new high-quality bluestone footpaths along Broadway and some of the side-streets.

The Auckland Regional Council has designated Newmarket as a 'strategic managed growth area' in the Regional Growth Strategy, meaning that high-density mixed use (residential and commercial) buildings are encouraged. This is to encourage areas in which work, living and entertainment can be achieved close to each other, limiting the average amount of [especially car-] traffic required every day. Good public transport connections are also considered to assist these policy goals. Partly due to the increasing attractiveness of living in the city, large apartment buildings are now increasingly springing up in the area, a process partly encouraged by council via new planning rules. However, many of the apartment buildings that were created in the suburb in the 2000s have been heavily criticised, and termed clusters of "shoe boxes" or "rabbit hutches", for their small unit sizes and bland exterior.

In 2007, the Lion Brewery declared its intention to leave Newmarket in the mid-term and sold its 5ha site north of Khyber Pass Road for NZ$162 million. The area is likely to become a mixed-use development within the next half decade, marking "the end of Newmarket's industrial age", especially after Hayes Metal Refineries Ltd, the other previously remaining industry, had also decided to move in 2008, after the owners had resisted development offers to be bought out in the 1980s.

In 2012 an initiative between Newmarket Business Association and the arts resulted in the creation of the town's first fully professional theatre company, Newmarket Stage Company.

Newmarket shopping area's wireless CCTV system, a system cooperatively operated by the police and the Newmarket Business Association, has been described as "never having been done on this scale in a New Zealand town centre", and was credited partly for significant falls of some sorts of crime in Newmarket in recent (2009) years.

== Demographics ==
Newmarket covers 0.85 km^{2} (0.33 sq mi) and had an estimated population of 2,910 as of June 2025, with a population density of 3,424 people per km^{2}.

Historical population
| Year | Pop. | ±% p.a. |
|---|---|---|
| 2006 | 2,262 | — |
| 2013 | 2,406 | +0.89% |
| 2018 | 2,631 | +1.80% |
| 2023 | 2,613 | −0.14% |
The 2006 population is for a larger area of 1.07 km^{2}. Source:

Newmarket had a population of 2,613 in the 2023 New Zealand census, a decrease of 18 people (−0.7%) since the 2018 census, and an increase of 207 people (8.6%) since the 2013 census. There were 1,182 males, 1,413 females and 18 people of other genders in 1,107 dwellings. 6.3% of people identified as LGBTIQ+. The median age was 34.1 years (compared with 38.1 years nationally). There were 285 people (10.9%) aged under 15 years, 798 (30.5%) aged 15 to 29, 1,266 (48.5%) aged 30 to 64, and 258 (9.9%) aged 65 or older.

People could identify as more than one ethnicity. The results were 30.9% European (Pākehā); 3.8% Māori; 3.3% Pasifika; 64.9% Asian; 2.9% Middle Eastern, Latin American and African New Zealanders (MELAA); and 0.9% other, which includes people giving their ethnicity as "New Zealander". English was spoken by 90.7%, Māori language by 0.7%, Samoan by 0.8%, and other languages by 54.5%. No language could be spoken by 0.9% (e.g. too young to talk). New Zealand Sign Language was known by 0.3%. The percentage of people born overseas was 66.1, compared with 28.8% nationally.

Religious affiliations were 29.5% Christian, 4.2% Hindu, 1.8% Islam, 5.6% Buddhist, 0.1% New Age, 0.2% Jewish, and 1.5% other religions. People who answered that they had no religion were 51.7%, and 5.3% of people did not answer the census question.

Of those at least 15 years old, 1,191 (51.2%) people had a bachelor's or higher degree, 693 (29.8%) had a post-high school certificate or diploma, and 441 (18.9%) people exclusively held high school qualifications. The median income was $49,100, compared with $41,500 nationally. 360 people (15.5%) earned over $100,000 compared to 12.1% nationally. The employment status of those at least 15 was that 1,311 (56.3%) people were employed full-time, 288 (12.4%) were part-time, and 75 (3.2%) were unemployed.

== Governance ==
The Newmarket Road District was formed in 1868, this became the Newmarket Borough in 1885 with an area of 180 acres (73 ha), in 1939 the borough annexed 9 acres (3.6 ha) from Auckland City. Newmarket Borough Council was merged into Auckland City Council in 1989 as part of the local government reforms, then eventually merged into Auckland Council in 2010. During the time when Newmarket was governing itself, it had its own mayor.

=== Mayors (1885–1989) ===
- William John Suiter, 1885–1887
- William Morgan, 1887–1891
- George Kent, 1891–1893
- Federick George Clayton, 1893–1895
- John McIntyre Laxon, 1895–1899
- John McColl, 1899–1904
- Francis Bennett, 1904–1909
- Ernest Hyam Davis, 1909–1911
- David Teed, 1911–1915
- James McColl, 1915–1917
- Christopher Leek, 1917–1921
- Samuel Donaldson, 1921–1944
- Richard Edward Newport, 1944–1944
- Charles Hugh Kay Mountain, 1944–1947
- Frederick Phillpott, 1947–1953
- George Albert Hardley, 1953–1957
- William "Bill" White, 1957–1974
- David Hadley Lumsden, 1974–1989

== Education ==
Newmarket School is a coeducational contributing primary school (years 1-6) with a roll of 251 as of July 2026.

The Senior Campus of ACG Parnell College is in Newmarket.

== Railway history ==
Newmarket was once a centre of railway activity, with significant growth occurring after the rail line from the city was opened in 1873. Eventually, there was a junction station, two signal boxes, two railway workshop complexes, railway houses, a railway social hall and extensive goods yard. This changed in 1930 when the Newmarket Workshops closed and its functions were taken over by the Otahuhu Workshops. The workshops bordering Broadway on the other side of the Remuera Road overbridge were torn down. The workshops along Middleton Road were retained and transferred to the New Zealand Post Office for use as Post Office workshops and these structures remained in place until they were unceremoniously torn down in the mid-1990s.

On 22 February 1955 the Railway Lodge No 196 of the Royal Antediluvian Order of Buffaloes was established in the Newmarket Railway Social Hall with a strong presence of over 100 brothers of the order, many of whom had connection with the railways. The Lodge continued to thrive for many years because of its link with the railways. The Railway Lodge 196 is a lodge of the New Zealand constitution of the Grand Lodge of England and continues to function, albeit in Ponsonby, not Newmarket.

In the 1980s the Newmarket Railway Social Hall and many other railway buildings were demolished. By 1995 all that was left of Newmarket's railway heritage was the Fine Station, closed in 1983 and its signal box still staffed, and one of the last in New Zealand to utilise the old style lever frame. The old workshop buildings on Middleton Road were demolished in that year. By the 21st century little remained of Newmarket's railway heritage other than the station, the signal box, a few items of preserved rolling stock and the Railway Lodge No 196.

Construction proceeded in 2008 on a new railway station and plaza on the northern side of Remuera Road overbridge, as a part of the Auckland Regional Transport Authority's upgrade of rail stations across the city. Designed by Opus International Consultants, the station features two concourses, multiple escalators, and open access to Broadway via a wide plaza. A footbridge allows access to the station for pedestrians from Remuera Road. The station opened on 14 January 2010 and is the second busiest in Auckland after Britomart.

== Climate ==
Climate data for Khyber Pass, Newmarket (1991–2020)
| Month | Jan | Feb | Mar | Apr | May | Jun | Jul | Aug | Sep | Oct | Nov | Dec | Year |
|---|---|---|---|---|---|---|---|---|---|---|---|---|---|
| Mean daily maximum °C (°F) | 23.4 (74.1) | 23.9 (75.0) | 22.3 (72.1) | 20.0 (68.0) | 17.7 (63.9) | 15.5 (59.9) | 14.8 (58.6) | 15.1 (59.2) | 16.4 (61.5) | 17.8 (64.0) | 19.3 (66.7) | 21.6 (70.9) | 19.0 (66.2) |
| Daily mean °C (°F) | 19.9 (67.8) | 20.4 (68.7) | 19.0 (66.2) | 17.0 (62.6) | 14.8 (58.6) | 12.6 (54.7) | 11.9 (53.4) | 12.2 (54.0) | 13.4 (56.1) | 14.7 (58.5) | 16.1 (61.0) | 18.3 (64.9) | 15.9 (60.5) |
| Mean daily minimum °C (°F) | 16.4 (61.5) | 17.0 (62.6) | 15.8 (60.4) | 14.0 (57.2) | 11.8 (53.2) | 9.8 (49.6) | 8.9 (48.0) | 9.2 (48.6) | 10.3 (50.5) | 11.6 (52.9) | 12.9 (55.2) | 14.9 (58.8) | 12.7 (54.9) |
| Average rainfall mm (inches) | 78.7 (3.10) | 49.8 (1.96) | 88.9 (3.50) | 100.5 (3.96) | 102.9 (4.05) | 113.7 (4.48) | 131.7 (5.19) | 118.4 (4.66) | 91.5 (3.60) | 100.7 (3.96) | 67.5 (2.66) | 88.6 (3.49) | 1,132.9 (44.61) |
Source: NIWA

== Notable buildings ==
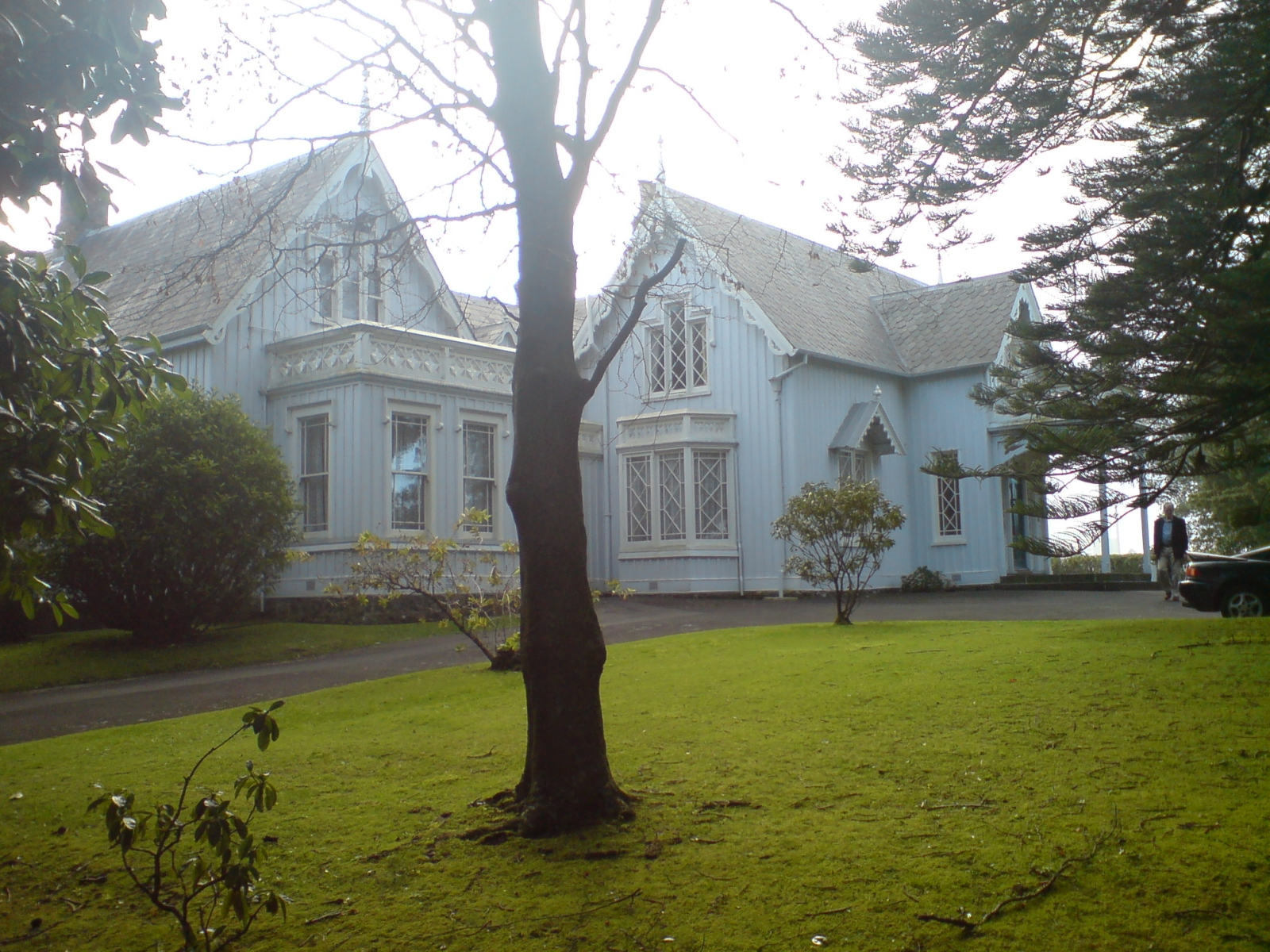
Highwic house, former homestead, now a function venue at the southwestern edge of Newmarket.

Owing to redevelopment, Newmarket has lost many of its buildings of historical significance.

- Highwic circa 1863, Gillies Avenue, old homestead of Alfred Buckland; extant & open to the public - has been called one of Auckland's most notable historic houses, built in the Carpenter Gothic style from an American pattern book.
- Junction Hotel 1850s Cnr of Broadway, Great South & Manukau Roads demolished.
- Newmarket Hotel 1850s, rebuilt 1920s Cnr Broadway & Morrow St demolished.
- St Georges Hotel 1880s Broadway opposite Khyber Pass demolished.
- Carlton Club 1890s corner of Broadway & Khyber Pass Road extant.
- Former Newmarket Manual Training School 1903, Seccombes Rd, moved to this site from Mortimer Pass Road in 1925.
- Captain Cook Brewery, 1870s - 1920s Khyber Pass road, demolished.
- Newmarket Borough Council Chambers 1920s Broadway demolished.
- Former Post Office, 1910, Broadway, John Campbell, altered.
- Rialto Picture Theatre 1920s Broadway, Keith Draffin architect, altered.
- St Peter's College and Christian Brothers House, 1939–1944, William Henry Gummer, architect, extant.
- Former Auckland Electric Power Board Building 1949 Remuera Road, Lew Piper architect. The top floor by J.I. Van Pels, was added in 1964. extant.
- Newmarket Train Station building, 1908, George Troup architect. extant but now refurbished and relocated to the platform at Parnell station.
- Former Jubilee Institute for the Blind, 1907 Edward Bartley architect, Parnell Road, now Parnell Public Library.
- Olympic Swimming Pool 1939, N.F Alcock borough engineer, Parnell Road. heavily altered, now covered by a cinema and car park.

== See also ==
- Newmarket Park
