= List of people educated at St Peter's College, Auckland =

This is a list of notable former students of St Peter's College, Auckland and at its predecessor school, St Peter's School. (Following the "Introduction" section below is an alphabetical list.)

== "Old Boys of Distinction" ==
St Peter's College has honoured old boys as "Old boys of Distinction" including the following:

- Denis George Browne – tenth Catholic Bishop of Auckland (1983–1994) and second Catholic Bishop of Hamilton (1994–2014)
- Cyril Eastlake – rugby league player who captained New Zealand at the 1954 World Cup and also played at the 1960 World Cup
- John Fitzmaurice – civil engineer
- Eddie Kohlhase MNZM – attended St Peter's in 1975 only; world champion softball player and coach
- Lt. Col (Ret.) Chris Mullane ONZM, MBE, JP – attended St Peter's in 1958 only; soldier and advocate for veterans' affairs
- Ronald Trubuhovich – medical doctor and pioneer of critical care medicine in Auckland

== Writers, artists, All Blacks and clergy ==
Old boys also include writers and poets Sam Hunt, Terry Locke, David McGill, Michael Morrissey, John Trenwith, Mark Williams, and from the earlier St Peter's, William Eugene Outhwaite. Artists George Baloghy and Glen Davis also attended the school. There are ten old boys who became All Blacks including Bernie McCahill, second five-eighth and centre three-quarter (1987–1991), the lock, Patrick Tuipulotu (appointed captain in 2024), the wing, AJ Lam and fly-half Harry Plummer. Two Catholic bishops, Edward Russell Gaines (1926–1994), the first Bishop Hamilton (1980–1994) and his successor Denis George Browne attended the school, as did nearly 100 Catholic priests, deacons and religious. In the nineteenth century, Matthew Joseph Brodie (1864–1943), second Bishop of Christchurch received part of his education at the "Pitt St [Catholic] School" (St Peter's School).

== Soldier/diplomat and banker ==
Martyn Dunne (as Brigadier) commanded New Zealand and international forces in East Timor (1999–2000). With the rank of Major general, he became Commander Joint Forces New Zealand in the New Zealand Defence Force (2001–2004) and was New Zealand High Commissioner to Australia (2011–2013). Michael Fay, New Zealand merchant banker, chair of the campaigns for three New Zealand challenges for the America's Cup in 1987, 1988 and 1992, attended the school in the early 1960s.

== Politicians ==
St Peter's has also produced politicians including five Members of Parliament (four of them were also Cabinet Ministers) and a Mayor of Auckland. Notable alumni who served in public office include:

- Chris Carter – Member of Parliament for Te Atatū and Cabinet Minister of several portfolios, including as Minister of Conservation
- Peter Dignan – was the fifteenth, and first New Zealand-born, Mayor of Auckland (St Peter's School)
- William Joseph Napier – was a Liberal Party Member of Parliament in the City of Auckland multi-member electorate (St Peter's School)
- John Sheehan – was the first New Zealand-born Member of Parliament elected by a general electorate (rather than a Māori electorate) and the first New Zealand-born person to hold cabinet rank served as Minister of Justice and Minister of Maori Affairs (St Peter's School)
- John Tamihere – was Member of Parliament for Hauraki and Tamaki Makaurau; was Minister of Small Business, Minister of Youth Affairs, Minister of Statistics and Minister for Land Information; President of Te Pāti Māori.
- Joseph Tole – served as Minister of Justice (St Peter's School)

== A ==
- Nick Afoa – (born 1986) - tenor and former New Zealand age grade rugby union football player
- John Akurangi (born 1970) - professional rugby union player.
- Jordan Arts – (born 1988) - member of duo Kids of 88, programming/keyboards; was a member of Incursa, a St Peter's College band which won the Smokefreerockquest in 2004
- Vince Aso – (born 1995) - rugby union football player for Auckland in the ITM Cup and the Hurricanes in Super Rugby
- Canaan Aumua (born 1990), Medical practitioner; Pasifika healthcare leader

== B ==
- Derek Balle (born 1964) – professional Standardbred horse trainer.
- David Barry (born 1939) – paediatrician
- George Baloghy (born 1950) – artist
- Thomas Victor Gerrard Beeson (1925 - 2021) original pupil of St Peter's College; Mayor of Onehunga (1968 - 1974)
- Myer Bevan (born 1997) – professional footballer; plays for Swedish team Husqvarna FF in Division 1 Södra, on loan from Vancouver Whitecaps FC, and the All Whites
- Michael Birch – journalist, Senior Australian Associated Press Correspondent in Vietnam in 1968; killed on 5 May 1968 in Saigon
- Jarred Blakiston (born 1991) – New Zealand actor and writer.
- Brian James Blacktop – (1937–2007) - solicitor; Assistant Public Trustee (1973–1981); Deputy Public Trustee (1981–1999)
- Milan Borich (born 1977) - musician
- Robert Brennan (1941-2026) – priest of the Missionary Society of St. Columban; missionary and social activist in South Korea
- Pat Brittenden (born 1973) – radio broadcaster
- Matthew Joseph Brodie (1871 – 1943) – second Bishop of Christchurch; received part of his education at the "Pitt St [Catholic] School" (St Peter's School)
- David Browne (born 1995) – Papua New Guinea footballer
- Denis George Browne CNZM, DD (1937-2024) – Catholic bishop; Bishop of Rarotonga (1977–1983); tenth Bishop of Auckland (1983–1994); second Bishop of Hamilton (1994–2014)
- Tony Buckley (born 1980) – Irish international rugby player

== C ==
- Donald John Cameron (1933 – 2016) – journalist and sportswriter
- Hon. Christopher Joseph Carter – Auckland local politician (2011–present); former senior United Nations official, New Zealand Labour Party politician, Member of Parliament for Te Atatū, and cabinet minister
- Marcus Chang (Chinese: 張立昂; born 28 May 1983) – Taiwanese actor and singer-songwriter.
- Grant Clancy, Olympian canoeist and kayaker; member of the 2024 New Zealand Olympic team, participating at the Paris Olympic Games in the C2 500 Canoe Sprint and the K4 Kayak sprint .
- Barney Clarke (1927-1999) – champion New Zealand boxer
- Robert Courtney – champion New Zealand Paralympian in wheelchair sprints; gold and bronze medal winner at the 1972 Heidelberg Paralympics; bronze medalist at the 1984 Summer Paralympics

== D ==
- Graeme Dallow – law professor; and Assistant Commissioner of Police
- Paul Dallow – New Zealand athletics representative as a hurdler
- Ross Dallow MNZM – senior member of the New Zealand Police; Auckland local government politician
- Simon Dallow – New Zealand television presenter and lawyer
- Sam de Jong – Los Angeles based music producer, songwriter, and multi-instrumentalist
- Graham Dewes (born 24 January 1982 in Suva) - former Fijian rugby union player. member the Fijian national team; member of the 2000 St Peter's College 1st XV playing as a front-rower.
- Peter Dignan – fifteenth and first New Zealand-born Mayor of Auckland (St Peter's School)
- Felix Cornelius Donnelly (1929 – 2019) – priest of the Diocese of Auckland, ordained in 1954; writer of non-fiction, novelist, academic, broadcaster, counsellor and founder of Youthline
- Patrick James "Pat" Downey OBE – barrister and solicitor, Human Rights Commissioner, legal editor
- Ron Duffy – international rugby league player
- Martyn Dunne CNZM – soldier (Major-General (rtd)), senior public servant, and diplomat
- Rhys Dunne – social activist, volunteer

== E ==
- Cyril Eastlake – rugby league international, member and captain of the Kiwis, St Peter's College's first international footballer^{[note a]}
- Matt Elliott – writer, biographer, historian (including a history of St Peter's College) and former New Zealand stand-up comedian
- Tony Eyre FCA PP (born in Auckland, 1953) – non-fiction writer and accountant with particular interest in the creative sector.

== F ==
- Siale Faeamani (born 23 March 2004), rugby league footballer; plays for the Gold Coast Titans in the National Rugby League (NRL)
- Ajay Faleafaga (born 2003), professional rugby union player
- Wynne Fallwell – milliner
- Sir Michael Fay – merchant banker; co-founder/joint chief executive and director of Fay, Richwhite and Co Ltd; chair of the campaigns for New Zealand challenges for the America's Cup in 1987, 1988 and 1992^{[note b]}
- Denis C. Feeney – professor of Classics and Giger Professor of Latin at Princeton University
- Michael James Fitzgerald – association football player, represented New Zealand at international level, plays club football for V-Varen Nagasaki on loan from Albirex Niigata
- John Fitzmaurice (2029-2018) – early student of St Peter's College; engineer, specialist in sewerage treatment infrastructure; St Peter's College Old Boy of Distinction 2017.
- Nepia Fox-Matamua – professional rugby union player
- Taina Fox-Matamua – professional rugby union player for the Tasman Mako in the Mitre 10 Cup competition

== G ==
- Edward Russell Gaines (1926–1994) – first Bishop of Hamilton
- Peter Robert Goddard – educationalist who attended St Peter's College 1943–1949
- Matt Griffin, Auckland artist.

== H ==
- Simon Hafoka – professional rugby player and coach
- Nathaniel Hailemariam (born 1994) footballer; plays as a forward.
- Bryn Hall – rugby player, plays scrum half for the Blues; captained the 2012 Junior All Blacks; Captain of the St Peter's College First XV in 2010
- Tony Halloran – Rugby player, Pharmacist
- Garth Harris – tax lawyer
- Paul Raymond Harris – chief executive of the New Zealand Electoral Commission
- Richard Edward Hendricks (1956–2022) – dairy farmer; pioneer of once a day milking.
- Shane Paul Howarth – rugby union player, played for the All Blacks, also played for Wales; rugby union coach
- Chris Huljich – Auckland manufacturer, merchant, entrepreneur, rentier and philanthropist^{[note c]}
- Michael Huljich – Auckland manufacturer, merchant, entrepreneur, rentier and philanthropist^{[note c]}
- Paul Richard Huljich – CEO of New Zealand's Best Corporation; American author of self-help books^{[note c]}
- Sam Hunt QSM, CNZM – (born 4 July 1946) - poet
- Peter John Hurley – ((6 January 1940 – 16 August 1983) - physician and researcher in nuclear medicine; Dux of the college, 1956

== J ==
- Mate I. J. Jakich – Auckland representative rugby union player
- Phillip Jew (1929–2019) – leading creator of the Auckland regional parks network.
- Colin Jillings (1931–2022) – trainer of thoroughbred horses and former jockey
- Matthew Johnson – rugby union player for the Blues in the Super Rugby competition
- Niko Jones (born 2000) – rugby union player playing for Auckland in the National Provincial Championship in 2022 as flanker.
- Stephen Jones – Olympic rower
- Bro Vincent Michael Innocent Jury c.f.c. – (1933–2023) B.Sc. (Hons) (in pure and applied mathematics) (Sydney); M.Sc (?) (Otago?) (1962); BA (1970); Dip.Ed: old boy of St Peter's College; taught at St Peter's College 1967–1974; Principal of two secondary schools (St Thomas of Canterbury College and Trinity Catholic College, Dunedin); pastoral worker and community adult education administrator and teacher, Christian Brothers outreach, the Edmund Rice Community, in Murupara, Bay of Plenty (1992–2008).

== K ==
- Richard Kearney – District Court judge; former member of the Waitangi Tribunal
- Nathan Kemp (born 1979) – New Zealand former professional rugby union player
- Adrian Kjellberg – Squash player and administrator.
- Kids of 88 – band comprising Jordan Arts and Sam McCarthy
- Chris Kohlhase – softball player, former member of the New Zealand national team the Black Socks; coach of the Samoan softball team
- Eddie Kohlhase MNZM – softball player; former member of the New Zealand national team the Black Socks; former coach of the Black Socks; member of the St Peter's College 4×100 metre team, National Champions and record holders for over 10 years
- Michael Kruse – Chief Justice of American Samoa

== L ==
- AJ Lam (born 1998) – rugby union player playing in 2022 for the Blues in Super Rugby; became All Black in 2022.
- Ben Lam (born 1991) – rugby union player; first old boy of St Peter's College to win a 2014 Commonwealth Games medal in the Rugby sevens
- Pat Lam (born 1968) – rugby union player and coach; played in the All Blacks; teacher at St Peter's College (1991–1992); uncle of Ben Lam
- Steve Lancaster (born 1971) – Rugby Union administrator;; former professional rugby union player.
- Anthony Gerald Lanigan MNZM (1947 – 2024) – engineer; first Chancellor of Auckland University of Technology; founding director and vice-chairman, Habitat for Humanity International; chairman of the Senate of Good Shepherd College
- David Lewis – New Zealand Men's Tennis Doubles Champion (with J. Dunphy) 1984–1985; member of the New Zealand Davis Cup squad 1985, the younger brother of Chris Lewis and Mark Lewis
- Mark Lewis – professional tennis coach; New Zealand Men's Tennis Singles Champion 1979–80; New Zealand Men's Tennis Doubles Champion 1983–1984; member of the New Zealand Davis Cup team in 1980 and 1981; younger brother of Chris Lewis and older brother of David Lewis
- Stefan Lipa – lawyer; president of the Social Credit Party (1979–1987)
- Terry Locke – poet, anthologist, academic, dux of St Peter's College 1965, won Junior National Scholarship 1965
- Jamie Love – New Zealand representative softball player; Captain of the Junior Black Sox Softball Team 2008; old boy of St Peter's College (2001–2007)
- Kurene Luamanuvae (born 2004) professional rugby union player for the Chiefs as prop.

== M ==
- Tony Mackle (1946-2024) – art historian and curator; author
- Aidan MacNaughton – guitarist; member of New Zealand heavy metal band Forsaken Age
- Thomas Mahoney – Auckland architect (St Peter's School)
- William Mahoney – Auckland's first New-Zealand-born priest (St Peter's School)
- Kevin Malloy – international chief executive, Starcom MediaVest Group (SMG) (advertising)
- Jack Manning – (1928–2021), New Zealand architect, designer of AMP Building, Auckland (1962) and the Majestic Centre, Wellington (1991) and many other buildings; awarded the New Zealand Institute of Architects (NZIA) Gold Medal 2011
- Bernie McCahill – rugby union player; played with the All Blacks^{[note d]}
- Sean McCahill – rugby union player; represented Ireland^{[note e]}
- Arden McCarthy – rugby league player; Fullback/wing/centre position; current Club, Vodafone Warriors (previously played for Cronulla Sharks and Richmond Rovers).
- Sam McCarthy – guitarist and vocalist; member of duo Kids of 88; member of Incursa, a St Peter's College band which won the Smokefreerockquest in 2004
- Patrick McClure AO – third sector leader; former CEO of Mission Australia, St Vincent de Paul, Retirement Villages Group, Macquarie Group; former Chair of the Government review of the welfare system in Australia
- Hugh McGahan MBE – former New Zealand rugby league representative; captain of the Kiwis
- David Keith McGill – writer and publisher, journalist, former chair of Amnesty International Aotearoa New Zealand; also educated at Holy Name Seminary
- Denzil Meuli – priest of the Diocese of Auckland; lawyer, writer, former editor of the Zealandia and a leading New Zealand traditionalist Catholic
- Constant Mews – Professor of Medieval Thought and Director, Centre for Studies in Religion and Theology, Monash University
- Douglas Mews – musician, academic, performer, conductor
- Bradley Moni Mika – rugby union player; played with the All Blacks, Auckland, Blues and Crusaders
- Dylan Mika – rugby union player; played with the All Blacks
- Chris Milicich – soccer coach for National New Zealand U20 team and Waitakere United
- Lisati Milo-Harris – rugby union player; member of the Chiefs in Super Rugby
- Anthony Molloy KC – lawyer, tax and trust law expert, author, editor, winegrower
- Joe Moodabe – operator of the large cinema chain Amalgamated Theatres, and other cinema enterprises
- Michael Moodabe – operator of the large cinema chain Amalgamated Theatres, and other cinema enterprises
- Royce Moodabe – operator of the large cinema chain Amalgamated Theatres, and other cinema enterprises
- Michael Morrissey – (born 1942) - poet and fiction writer
- Christopher Mullane ONZM, MBE, LOM (USA) – New Zealand army officer (Lt. Col. (rtd.))
- Peter Musson – bassoonist

== N ==
- William Joseph Napier (1857–1925), lawyer, Liberal Party Member of Parliament for the City of Auckland electorate multi-member electorate 1899–1902 (St Peter's School)
- Gray Nelson (1927–2022), original student at St Peter's College; senior public servant (private secretary to five NZ prime ministers); diplomat
- Steve Nesbit (Steven Roberto) (born 1936), All Black, first five-eighth (1960) (St Peter's College's first old boy All Black)
- Frank Nobilo (Frank Ivan Joseph) (born 1960), CNZM (1998, for services to golf), professional golfer; New Zealand representative
- Dion Nukunuku (born 1970), member of the New Zealand national softball team, the Black Socks
- Nathan Nukunuku (born 1980), member of the New Zealand national softball team, the Black Socks

== O ==
- Brian Desmond O'Flaherty (born in Wellington, 1938), New Zealand horse-racing and equestrian journalist, television equestrian sports commentator and equestrian sports administrator; executive director, NZ Thoroughbred Breeders' Assn.
- Patrick O'Reilly (1843–1914), Monsignor, Catholic priest and educationalist in the Diocese of Auckland (St Peter's School)
- Mana Otai (born 1968), International Rugby Union player, representing Tonga; captain of Tonga at 1995 Rugby World Cup; All Black trialist 1994
- Michael Otto (1975–81), Editor of NZ Catholic; Dux of the college 1981
- Charles Thomas Outhwaite (1845–1925), sportsman and lawyer; oldest son of Thomas Outhwaite; educated in Auckland (St Peter's School, Auckland) and Paris; associate to Sir George Arney, Chief Justice of New Zealand; his sister, Isa Outhwaite, donated the St Peter's College site to the Bishop of Auckland for education purposes; brother of William Eugene Outhwaite
- William Eugene Outhwaite (1847–1900), writer, poet, sportsman, sports enthusiast, critic and lawyer; second son of Thomas Outhwaite; brother of Charles Thomas Outhwaite; educated in Paris and at St Peter's School, Auckland,

== P ==
- Stephen Parke, PhD (Harvard), DSc (University of Auckland) attended St Peter's (1963-1968); Dux (1968). Theoretical Physicist, Distinguished Scientist and former Head of the Theoretical Physics Dept. at Fermilab, USA.
- John Patterson (born 1855), Auckland city councillor 1900–1903 and 1908–1911; prominent Auckland businessman; coachbuilder, wheelwright, farrier, and general blacksmith (St Peter's School)
- Jean-Baptiste Piggin (1953-2019), journalist; scholar of Roman maps and diagrams, especially the 4th-century Tabula Peutingeriana and a 5th-century Latin diagram of biblical history.
- Harry Plummer (born 1998), professional rugby union player; All Black (from 2024); plays for the Blues in Super Rugby.
- Martin Pringle (born 1964), representative cricket player in New Zealand A; Auckland representative cricket player

== R ==
- Anthony George Ravlich (born in Auckland, 1949), activist, politician and writer in the area of human rights, especially in relation to economic, social and cultural rights
- Martin Reyners (Martin Everardus) (born 1950), leading New Zealand scientist in seismology and plate tectonics
- Maurice Rice (born 30 June 1926) original pupil of St Peter's College; Solicitor.
- Dane Aaron Rumble (born 1982), recording artist, former member of New Zealand hip hop group Fast Crew

== S ==
- Francis Saili (born 1991), New Zealand rugby player, who plays at the centre position for Munster (Ireland) and played for the Blues in Super Rugby; named a member of the All Blacks in 2013; brother of Peter Saili
- Peter Saili (born 1989), New Zealand rugby player, plays at the flanker position for the Blues in Super Rugby; brother of Francis Saili
- Ronald Fong Sang (1938–2021) (born in Fiji), ONZM (2000 for services to architecture and the arts), BArch (1961) Auck, Auckland architect, art collector, art exhibiter and publisher of New Zealand art books
- Dimitrius Schuster-Koloamatangi (born 2001), actor.
- Patrick James Sheahan (1928–2013), prominent Auckland publican, publisher and sportsman; a first day pupil of St Peter's College in 1939
- John Sheehan (1844–1885), lawyer, 19th-century New Zealand politician; the first New Zealand-born Member of Parliament elected by a general electorate (rather than a Māori electorate); first New Zealand-born person to hold cabinet rank; Member of Parliament 1872–1885; Cabinet Minister from 1877 to 1879 – Minister of Justice and Minister of Māori Affairs (St Peter's School)
- Joshua Smith (born 2004) rugby union player for Force and Hawke's Bay as prop.
- Sean Solia (born 15 December 1992), professional cricketer representing Auckland.
- Denny Solomona (born in Auckland, 1993), rugby league player for the Castleford Tigers in the Super League; previously played with London Broncos and the Melbourne Storm under 20s
- Andrew Stroud (born 1967), retired New Zealand superbike champion
- Cameron Suafoa (born 23 April 1998), professional rugby union player (flanker).
- Antony Sumich (born 1964), rugby union and cricket international, priest of Priestly Fraternity of Saint Peter
- Rory Sweetman (born 1956), New Zealand historian, specialising especially in Irish history and the history of the New Zealand Catholic church

== T ==
- John Tamihere (John Henry) (born 1959), lawyer, New Zealand Labour Party and Te Pāti Māori politician, former Member of Parliament, Cabinet Minister, talkback host, Maori leader; political commentator
- Jonathan Temm QC (1962–2021), barrister, Rotorua, President of the New Zealand Law Society (2010–2013)
- Luteru Tolai (born 1998), professional rugby union player; plays at hooker; member of the Auckland Blues (from 2020) in Super Rugby.
- Joseph Tole (1847–1920), lawyer; 19th-century Member of the New Zealand Parliament 1876–1887; Minister of Justice from 1884 to 1887 (St Peter's School)
- Konrad Toleafoa (born 2003), professional rugby union player
- Soane Tongaʻuiha (born 1982), Tongan rugby union international representative; plays for the Northampton Saints; born in Tonga and educated in Auckland at St Peter's College.
- Jordan Trainor (born 1996), New Zealand rugby union; plays as an outside back for the Blues in the international Super Rugby competition
- John Francis Ernest Trenwith (1951–1998) MA (Hons) (1973) Auckland, writer, humorist and academic; Principal Lecturer, Advertising, Auckland Institute of Technology; known for his two comic novels, A50 among the Angels and A50 Revs Up
- Ronald Trubuhovich (Ronald Valentine) (1929-2026) ONZM (1997, for services to medicine), Dux of St Peter's College in 1946 and 1947; medical doctor and pioneer of critical care medicine in Auckland; honoured in 2012 by being named an "old boy of distinction" of St Peter's College
- Hamdahn Tuipulotu (born 2000) rugby union player for Blues and Southland as prop.
- Patrick Tuipulotu (born 1993), New Zealand professional rugby union player; first selected as All Black on 1 June 2014 appointed All Blacks captain in 2024.
- Tito Tuipulotu (born 2002) - professional rugby union player for Moana Pasifika and Auckland. His preferred position is prop.
- Philip Turner (born 1960), New Zealand Public Servant and Diplomat; New Zealand ambassador to Korea (April 2018 – 2023)

== U ==
- Stipe Ukich (born 2007) - professional footballer, All White

== V ==
- Martin van Beynen (Martin John) (born 1959), MA (1982) Auck; Senior Journalist on The Press, Christchurch
- Sam Verlinden (born 1997), singer and actor – St Peter's College, Auckland
- Ivan Vuksich (born 1948), New Zealand soccer administrator
- Luka Vicelich (born 2008), Professional footballer.

== W ==
- Sean Wainui (23 October 1995 – 18 October 2021), New Zealand rugby union player for Bay of Plenty, the Chiefs in Super Rugby, and for New Zealand's Māori international side the Māori All Blacks.
- Reid Walker (born 2000), New Zealand actor who stars as recurring character Harry Warner in soap opera Shortland Street
- Ray Waru (born 1952), New Zealand television producer and director
- Tony Watkins (L Anthony) (born 1938), BArch, MArch (Hons) (1967) Auck, DipTP, FNZIA, RIBA, architect, planner, and urban designer, author; emeritus professor of architecture at the University of Auckland; specialist in Vernacular Architecture
- Peter Watt c.f.c. – a teacher at St Peter's 1969–1972, 1980 and 1986–2016
- Mark Williams (born 1951), MA (Hons) (Auckland), PhD (British Columbia) (1983), academic, writer, critic, poet
- Zac Williams (born 1995), Olympic cyclist
- David Wong (born 1990), musician; bass guitar player; member of the band False Start; member of Incursa, a St Peter's College band which won the Smokefreerockquest in 2004
- James Wong (born 1991), musician (Keyboards) and songwriter; former member of band Shotgun Alley.
- Sam Wye (born 2000), professional rugby union player

== See also ==
- List of former staff of St Peter's College, Auckland
- Congregation of Christian Brothers in New Zealand

== Notes ==
- ^note a: Eastlake was tendered a presentation at St Peter's College on Tuesday 14 August 1951 prior to his departure with the NZ team.
- ^note b: Michael [Fay's] primary days were spent attending first Mt Carmel [School, Meadowbank] (from five to nine years) and later St Peter's (nine to 12 years), a prep school to ready him for secondary education". In fact, Fay attended St Peter's College for his Form 1 and 2 years (11 and 12 years of age). In both classes (Form I Blue and Form II Blue), his form teacher was Brother N. C. Doherty, who was later the seventh principal of St Peter's College (1975–1980). In 1960 Fay was awarded the Christian Doctrine prize (i.e. first in the class for religious knowledge) for Form I Blue. He played cricket for the school in 1960 and rugby for the school in 1961. Fay's education was completed at St. Patrick's College, Silverstream and Victoria University of Wellington.
- ^[note c]: Chris Huljich was in the following classes: 1962 Form I Gold (Mr P O'Connor), 1963 Form II Gold (Br V N Cusack), 1964 Form IIIG (Br J Lauren – "... we are proud of our budding actors: [including] Chris Huljich"), 1965 Form IVM (Br Dowling – " ... it's the quiet thinking type that is hard to beat when it comes to study... [including] Chris Huljich"), 1966 Form V Gold (Br J D O'Neill), 1967 Form VIJ (Mr Ted Thorpe?). Chris Huljich left St Peter's College at the end of his lower sixth form year and went to Auckland University in 1968. Paul Huljich was in the following classes: 1964 Form I Red (Br McCombie), 1965 Form II Red (Mr Mansfield), 1966 Form IIIM (Mr T K Weal), 1967 Form IVM (Br P N Mason), 1968 Form VR (Br L H Wilkes), 1969 (?). Michael Huljich commenced at St Peter's College in 1968 and was in the following classes: 1968 Form I Red (Br Scott)1969 etc. (??). In 1968, Mrs Elizabeth Huljich, mother of the Huljich brothers, was elected as the President of the St Peter's College Ladies Committee: "[Mrs Huljich's] worthiness was soon manifested when, within a few days she made a selection of immediate assistants. Mrs Huljich was anxious to have a mother to represent each class". "With the active support of former enthusiasts, this now meant that the work could be shared by many more mothers. Is there not a parallel here to Pope John XXIII and his prompt addition to the College of Cardinals? We welcome Mrs Huljich to the Office of President and assure her of our confidence and support." Mrs Huljich held the position for two years.
- ^[note d]: Bernie McCahill attended St Peter's College from 1978 until 1982 (1978), Form 3G (Bro P C Ryan); 1979 Form 4G (Mr N Munro); 1980 Form 5B (Mr S J Beguely); 1981 Form 6R (Bro Bradey); 1982 Form 6R (Mrs J Scott). He obtained University Entrance in 1982.
- ^[note e]: Sean McCahill attended St Peter's from 1980 until 1984 (1980, Form 1G (Bro V Cusack); 1981, Form 2B (Mr J Ekeroma); 1982 Form 3G (Mr J J Brady); 1983 Form 4G (Bro P. Boyd); 1984 Form 5W (Mr J Freeman)).

== Main sources ==
- Zealandia, 1939–1990.
- St Peter's College Magazines, St Peter's College, Auckland, 1948–2008.
- St Peter's College Silver Jubilee 1939–1964, Christian Brothers Old Boys Association, Auckland, 1964.
- J.C. O'Neill, The History of the Work of the Christian Brothers in New Zealand, unpublished Dip. Ed. thesis, University of Auckland, 1968.
- Felix Donnelly, One Priest's Life, Australia and New Zealand Book Company, Auckland, 1982.
- Paul Malcolm Robertson, Nga Parata Karaitiana The Christian Brothers, A Public Culture in Transition, A Comparative Study of the Indian and New Zealand Provinces, an unpublished thesis for MA in anthropology, University of Auckland, 1996.
- NZ Catholic : the national Catholic newspaper, 1996– present.
- Graeme Donaldson, To All Parts of the Kingdom: Christian Brothers in New Zealand 1876–2001, Christian Brothers New Zealand Province, Christchurch, 2001.
- New Zealand Who's Who Aotearoa 2001, Alistair Taylor, Wellington, 2001.
- Nicholas Reid, James Michael Liston: A Life, Victoria University Press, Wellington, 2006.
- Elliott, Matt (2015). On This Rock: 75 Years of St Peter's College, Mountain Road. St Peter's College, Auckland. ISBN 978-0-473-331542.
