= Huljich Wealth Management (NZ) Ltd =

New Zealand funds management company

Huljich Wealth Management (NZ) Ltd was a New Zealand funds management company associated with Peter Huljich and the politicians Don Brash and John Banks. By the time of its sale in 2010 the company had grown the largest privately managed KiwiSaver Scheme (by members) in the country.

== History ==
The three Huljich brothers met John Banks in the 1970s when they frequented his cafe. In 2007, Peter Huljich, son of Chris, with the support of Banks and former National Party leader and Reserve Bank Governor Don Brash set up a "boutique funds management company" in downtown Auckland, partly to manage the Huljich family's extensive investment portfolio.

== Operations ==
The operating company, Huljich Wealth Management (NZ) Ltd, established three KiwiSaver funds. The company targeted "high-net-worth individuals" although smaller investors could "gain access through KiwiSaver or through the balanced fund". John Banks said he, Brash and the Huljichs "would be fairly choosy about who invests with us". In 2009, Huljich Wealth Management was the largest 100% owned New Zealand-owned KiwiSaver provider in the country.

== Compensation Payments ==
In 2010, Peter Huljich admitted responsibility for "lapses" in investment practice when he failed to disclose that he had compensated the company's KiwiSaver funds for poorer than expected returns. He had made two payments of $150,000.) . Rival fund managers Gareth Morgan and Carmel Fisher described Huljich's conduct as "beyond the pale". His role as managing director and chief investment officer was taken over by the company's chairman, Don Brash and Huljich was replaced on the Board of the company by his father, Chris Huljich. In taking over Peter Huljich's executive roles, Brash admitted that the business had not been transparent but also pointed out that a number of allegations about the way Huljich KiwiSaver Funds had been managed were unfair and untrue. Brash left the firm and sold his shares in October 2010. John Banks then took over the management role.

== Conviction ==
In November 2010, the Securities Commission laid criminal charges against Huljich Wealth Management and director Peter Huljich. In December 2011, Peter Huljich and the company (now called HWM NZ Holdings) were convicted for undermining public confidence in the KiwiSaver market and misleading investors. Huljich was fined $112,500 and the company $239,000 (plus $95,000 to be paid to the prosecution (the Crown via the Financial Markets Authority which had replaced the Securities Commission on 1 May 2011) for court costs. Peter Huljich had rejoined HWM's board as the sole director in August 2011.

== Sale ==
In May 2011 Huljich Wealth Management sold its KiwiSaver business, consisting of 87,000 KiwiSaver members with entitlements of $191 million, to Fisher Funds Management Limited for $20.9 million. Chairman John Banks explained that the shareholders had decided to move on from the KiwiSaver business, "recognising that increasing compliance costs and regulation would change the KiwiSaver landscape in future years". Huljich Wealth Management retained responsibility for debts and payables. The proceeds were reduced by a $4.29 million write-off of fees, "stamp duty" and losses on vehicles sold, leaving a gain on the disposal of the business of $16.53 million. The business made a profit of $13.5 million in the 14 months to 31 May 2011 compared to a loss of $771,737 in the previous year. The accounts for the 14 months to May 31, 2011 filed in the Companies Office showed share capital of $1,000 and retained earnings of $9.6 million.

== See also ==
- Huljich family
- Paul Huljich
