= Kohlhase =

Kohlhase is a German surname. Notable people with the surname include:

- Charles Kohlhase (born 1935), American aerospace engineer
- Chris Kohlhase (1967–2015), New Zealand softball player
- Eddie Kohlhase, New Zealand softball player
- Hans Kohlhase (c. 1500 – 1540), German historical figure
- Marilyn Kohlhase (born 1953) New Zealand curator and arts administrator
- Michael Kohlhase (born 1964), German computer scientist
- Sebastian Kohlhase (born 1942), Samoan cricketer
- Walther Kohlhase (1908–1993), German painter

== See also ==
- Kohlhaase
- 13801 Kohlhase, main-belt asteroid
