= Koolhaas =

Koolhaas is a Dutch surname. Notable people with the surname include:

- Anton Koolhaas (1912–1992), Dutch journalist, novelist, and scenario writer
- Rem Koolhaas (born 1944), Dutch architect
- Caspar Koolhaas (1536–1615), Reformed theologian

== See also ==
- Kohlhase
