= Kohlhaase =

Kohlhaase is a German surname. Notable people with the surname include:

- Bill Kohlhaase, American music critic
- Jan Kohlhaase (born 1976), German mathematician
- Wolfgang Kohlhaase (1931–2022), German screenwriter and film director

== See also ==
- Kohlhase
