= Paul Huljich =

New Zealand businessman

Paul Huljich (/ˈtʃuːlɪtʃ/ CHOO-litch; born 1952) is a native of New Zealand who moved to the United States in 1998 to seek medical treatment for his bipolar disorder. He is best known as the chairman and joint CEO of New Zealand's Best Corporation, and as the author of two self-help books. His books, The Stress Pandemic and Betrayal of Love and Freedom, seek to teach audiences a drug-free way of overcoming stress.

== Early life ==
Paul Huljich was born in Auckland, New Zealand in 1952 to Elizabeth Huljich and Peter Steven Huljich, and is the middle child of three brothers. He attended primary school at St. Ignatius Convent, and attended St. Peter's College for his secondary education. He briefly attended the University of Auckland where he began a degree in commerce, but did not complete his degree due to starting several small businesses, including fruit juice and construction.

Huljich experienced a mental breakdown and became a ward of the state in 1998. He sought help from medical experts in the United States and went to Minnesota where he continued his recovery at the Mayo Clinic in Rochester. After that treatment, he then admitted himself to the Menninger Clinic in Topeka, Kansas. He has not received medical treatment for his bipolar and stress disorder since 2000 and claims to have fully cured himself by applying "9 Natural Steps."

Huljich was married to Susan Crawford in 1976; they divorced after 23 years. He has three sons: Mark Richard, Simon Paul and Richard Paul.

== Career ==
Huljich, with his brothers, founded Best Corporation in 1985 and continued to run the company until 1998. He served as chairman and Joint CEO. The Best Corporation was first listed on the stock exchange in December 1991. It later developed food products in Australia, investing resources into research and development for organic foods. The company specialised in a wide range of foods for export and found great success in developing organic foods for what it considered to be the most demanding market in the world, Japan. The Best Corporation was sold to the multinational food company Dannon in 1993, where it was valued at more than $100 million.

Huljich is currently an author, and a member of the American Institute of Stress, and the Mwella Community. He does speaking tours throughout the United States, most recently a 20 'Stress- City' book tour, ending in a "Say 'No' to Stress" seminar in Maui, Hawaii.

== Writing ==
Huljich's second book is a stress management and self-help book, published on 30 July 2013, Stress Pandemic The Lifestyle Solution (9 Natural Steps to Survive, Master Stress and Live Well). The book aims to teach people how to deal with their stress without the use of medication through nine easy steps. Huljich "encourages readers to 'take charge' and be aware 'of your thoughts and desires'". In the novel, Huljich uses the 9 natural steps to shape the content and help readers through their stress. The 9 steps are: (1) taking charge, (2) kicking bad habits, (3) learning to say no, (4) affirmations, (5) exercise, (6) nutrition, (7) sleep, (8) the power of awareness, and (9) don't give up.

Huljich's first novel, Betrayal of Love and Freedom, is a work of fiction centered on his own personal life. It focuses on the life of two men, Luke Powers and Rick Dellich. The book has three sections; the first is concerned with Luke Powers, the second covers Rick Dellich's life and the third is a combination of the two and the conclusion of the book. Betrayal of Love and Freedom was published in paperback by Mwella Publishing on 1 May 2010.

The second edition of Stress Pandemic: 9 Natural Steps to Break the Cycle of Stress & Thrive is the Winner of Gold, in the USA Best Book Award 2014: New Non Fiction, Winner of Gold, in the USA Best Book Award 2014: Self Help and Finalist in USA Best Book Award 2014: Health (Psychology and Mental health), Health (Addictions and Recovery). Huljich was also a finalist for the USA Best Book Award 2014: Cover Design – Non Fiction (EN).

== Family relationships ==
In 2014 it was reported that Elizabeth Huljich, the 84-year-old mother of the Huljich brothers, had filed an application in the High Court at Auckland for a summary judgment to force her eldest son Christopher Huljich to repay a $264,000 mortgage registered over her St Heliers home, widened in 2018 to include thirteen other claims of action. In December 2018, Judge Venning dismissed all the claims by Elizabeth, and awarded costs of $650,000 to Christopher, describing the claims as vexatious and frivolous.

As at 2018, as a separate matter, Paul Huljich sued his two brothers, Christopher and Michael Huljich, and his nephew, Peter Huljich, over the distribution of family assets.

== See also ==
- List of people educated at St Peter's College, Auckland
- Huljich Wealth Management (NZ) Ltd
- Huljich family
