= Huljich family =

New Zealand banking family

The Huljich family are a very high net worth family located in Auckland, New Zealand, worth at least NZD$444 million in 2021 following the sale of their stake in Pushpay for that amount. Their business interests are varied, and include property, new business startups, finance, movie-making and philanthropy. They are of Croatian descent.

== Family ==
The patriarch of the family was Peter S Huljich (now deceased). He was a restaurateur and property owner. His business interests were succeeded by his three sons:

- Christopher Huljich, born 1950, married with four adult children. His children include Jason Huljich (an Australian resident businessman), Peter Huljich (also a businessman) and Rachel Huljich (a former Miss New Zealand winner).
- Paul Huljich, born 1952, divorced, with three adult children, resident in Auckland. His children include Mark (a movie producer) and Simon Spire (a musician).
- Michael Huljich, born 1957, married, resident in Australia.

== Business interests ==
The Huljich brothers (Chris, Paul and Michael), founded a food manufacturing business, at first under the name Top Hat Bacon, in the 1980s specialising in various pork products or small goods (e.g. processed meats bought from a delicatessen, such as bacon, sausages, pâté and salami). This enterprise grew into the Best Corporation (a major brand continued to be "Top Hat Bacon") which operated an important segment of the market in New Zealand and owned considerable assets in Australia. In the late 1990s the three brothers sold Best Corporation to French food company Groupe Danone and also sold valuable Australian assets. After the sale of Best Corporation, the three brothers separately invested their proceeds into different interests:

Christopher Huljich and his son Peter founded Huljich Wealth Management (NZ) in 2007. This business was sold for $20.9m NZX to Fisher Funds Limited in 2011 after a period of fast growth in the business led to lapses in investment management. The company was subsequently prosecuted by the Securities Commission and fined $239,000 plus $95,265 in legal costs.

Paul Huljich has authored a number of fiction and non-fiction books, which chronicle his battle with depression and stress. These books include a novel loosely based on his experiences with mental illness and his subsequent drug-free recovery, called "Betrayal of Love and Freedom". He now lectures worldwide on curing and mitigating the effects of depression.

Mark Huljich (son of Paul) has produced a number of children's movies loosely based on the Robert Louis Stevenson book "Treasure Island". These films starred US actor Randy Quaid.

Christopher and Peter Huljich have invested (via their private equity business Christopher and Banks Limited (John Banks (managing partner) and Chris Hulich (partner)), in a number of business startups and established technology businesses including "Pushpay" which facilitates donations to charitable organisations and of which Peter and Chris Huljich are directors. On 14 July, interests associated with Peter and Chris Huljich sold a $120m bloc of shares, representing around 5% of the company share register. They continued to hold around 15% of the company post selldown .

== Pushpay insider trading conviction ==
In 2022 Peter Huljich was charged with insider trading by the Financial Markets Authority (New Zealand).

One of the co-founders of Pushpay, Eliot Crowther, informed Huljich, who was in a role of a general managed at the time, about desire to leave the company and sell his shares. According to the court, Peter Huljich than used this information for financial gain prior to the public announcement of Crowther's departure from the company. Peter Huljich was sentenced to community detention and ordered to pay a fine of $100,000 which was later increased by Court of Appeal to $200,000.

== Philanthropy ==
The family created the Huljich Foundation, a charitable trust that supports seriously ill children. The trust provides a memorable experience for children with a poor prognosis. The experience is to be chosen by the child to share the experience with their family.

== Family discord ==
In 2014 it was reported that Elizabeth, the mother of brothers Christopher, Paul and Michael, had filed an application in the High Court at Auckland to force her son Christopher to repay a mortgage registered over her St Heliers property. He defended the action, stating that the claim was misconceived.

In late 2018, the legal dispute was comprehensively settled when the Judge threw out a number of courses of action and awarded $650,000 in costs to Christopher, describing the case brought by Elizabeth as "vexatious and frivolous“.

== See also ==
- Huljich Wealth Management (NZ) Ltd
- List of people educated at St Peter's College, Auckland
- Paul Huljich
