= Steve Nesbit =

Steven Roberto Nesbit
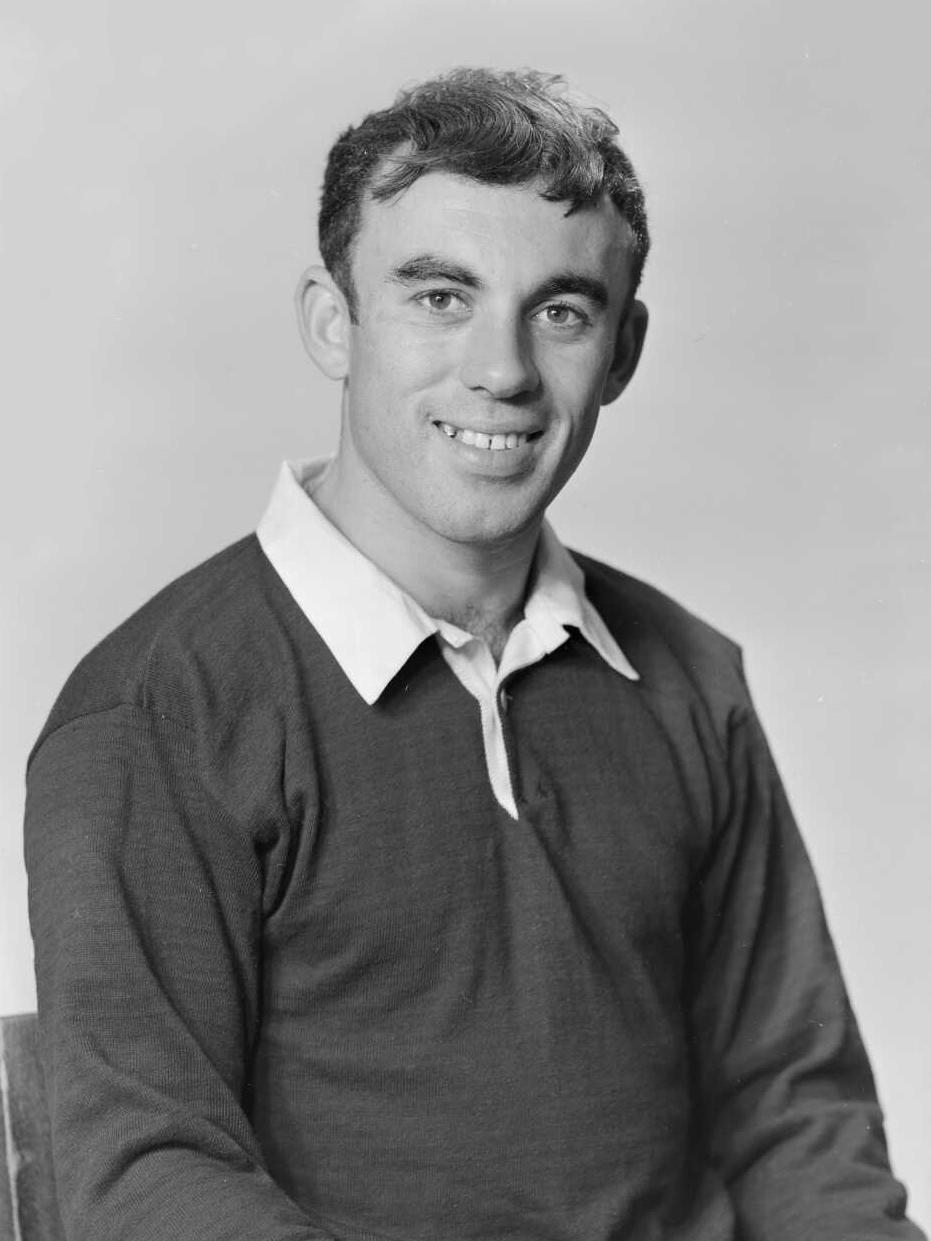
- Born: Steven Roberto Nesbit; 13 February 1936 (age 90) Auckland, New Zealand
- Height: 1.68 m (5 ft 6 in)
- Weight: 64 kg (10 st 1 lb)
- School: St Peter's College, Auckland

Rugby union career
- Position: first five-eighth
Senior career
Years	Team	Apps	(Points)
- Auckland Marist
Provincial / State sides
Years	Team	Apps	(Points)
- Auckland
International career
Years	Team	Apps	(Points)
1960	All Blacks		(6 (2 tries))

Steven Roberto Nesbit (born 13 February 1936) is a former New Zealand rugby union footballer. He played 13 matches, including 2 tests, in the position of first five-eighth for the All Blacks in 1960. Nesbit toured South Africa in 1960 and played in the second and third tests. He later went to the United States and toured New Zealand with a Californian Universities team.

== See also ==
- List of alumni of St Peter's College, Auckland
