= Martin Reyners =

New Zealand physicist

Martin Everardus Reyners (born 1950) FRSNZ is a New Zealand geophysicist and seismologist. He is a principal scientist at the Institute of Geological and Nuclear Sciences (GNS Science), Lower Hutt, and is a specialist in subinduction zones, especially in relation to New Zealand.

== Education ==
He was educated at St Peter's College, Auckland and the Victoria University of Wellington, completing a PhD in geophysics in 1978.

== Career ==
His work has "enabled three-dimensional tomographic imaging of the structure of the colliding plates" and has so shown the modus operandi of plate tectonics under New Zealand, especially in relation to the Taupō Volcanic Zone, which is "the most frequently active and productive silicic volcanic system on Earth." He has cast light on the mysterious termination of volcanic activity at Mount Ruapehu and its non-continuation with the subducted Pacific Plate further south under New Zealand" He is currently examining why the New Zealand tectonic plates are jammed together in some places because, if these unjam, there could be a large earthquake

He is a fellow of the Royal Society of New Zealand (FRSNZ), and has been awarded the Hochstetter Lectureship, and (twice) the New Zealand Geophysics Prize.

== See also ==
- Dr. Reyner's scientific publications:
- For some more biographical details: List of alumni of St Peter's College, Auckland
