= John Trenwith =

New Zealand writer

John Francis Ernest Trenwith (2 July 1951 – 20 May 1998) was a New Zealand writer, humorist and academic. He was principal lecturer, Advertising, Auckland Institute of Technology. He wrote two comic novels, A50 among the Angels and A50 Revs Up.

== Early life ==
Trenwith was born in Auckland. He was educated at Good Shepherd School, Balmoral (primary) and St Peter's College, Grafton (secondary). He studied at the University of Auckland and at the Auckland Teachers College (where he obtained Dip TC, Diploma of Teaching in 1978).

== Academic career ==
Trenwith worked as a secondary school teacher at Howick College and other schools before joining the marketing Department of the Auckland Institute of Technology. He wrote two textbooks on television and newspapers. At the time of his death, he was enrolled as a PhD student at Auckland University and completed his doctoral thesis a week before he died. It was entitled The construction of a commerce degree in the new market: the Bachelor of Business at the Auckland Institute of Technology, 1990–1992.

== Novels ==
The novels, A50 among the Angels and A50 Revs Up, began as stories Trenwith wrote for National Radio in the late 1980s about the mischievous altar boy Ernest Trugood and his expatriate Irish Parish Priest, "A50" (named after his car, a grey Austin A50). The main location is the Good Shepherd church and school in Telford Avenue, Balmoral. Recorded in 1990, the stories were broadcast on the Maggie Barry Show in 1991. Constant requests from listeners made the tapes among the most popular items from Replay Radio and led to the publications of the two books.

== AIT ==
In preparing his doctoral thesis, Trenwith became an expert on the history of the Auckland Institute of Technology. His "years of historical sleuthing" made him "AIT's unofficial historian" and provided the main bulk of the institution's centennial publication and for the centennial itself. Trenwith "gave the institute a precious gift, our history. He gave his students his knowledge, his wisdom and his heart, and they loved him for it."

== Publications ==
- Television Perspectives, Longman Paul, Auckland 1986. (textbook for media studies)
- Newspapers in Action, Heinemann Education, 1990. (textbook for media studies))
- A50 Among the Angels, Mandarin, Auckland, 1991. (novel)
- A50 Revs Up, Mandarin, Auckland. (novel)
- Our First 100 Years 1895–1995, Auckland Institute of Technology, 1995. (co-author)
