= Moodabe family =

Family from Auckland, New Zealand

The Moodabe family is a long established Auckland family which has been associated with the development and operation of cinema in New Zealand since the 1920s.

== Business beginnings ==
Michael Joseph Moodabe, OBE (1895–1975) was born in Sydney, Australia, on 24 June 1895, and, after the family shifted to Auckland, his brother Joseph Patrick Moodabe (1899–1985), was born in Auckland on 16 December 1899. Their parents were Ferris Moudabber and his wife Elizabeth Ann (née Akoorie).

== Amalgamated expansion ==
When Thomas O'Brien who owned and operated the Civic Theatre went bankrupt in 1932, the Moodabe brothers took over O'Brien's other Auckland theatres, including the Princess (later the Plaza), the Rialto in Newmarket, and the Tivoli in Karangahape Road. Amalgamated obtained a 50-year lease on the Civic theatre in 1945 when they managed to outbid Warner Brothers Pictures and Robert Kerridge.

== MJ's sons ==
MJ and Alma Moodabe's three sons, Royce Joseph Moodabe (born 1930), Joseph Patrick Moodabe (1937 – 8 December 2019) and Michael Barry Joseph Moodabe (15 December 1932 – 3 September 2009) grew up in Epsom, Auckland and were educated at St Peter's College. The three sons used to visit their father's office in the Civic Theatre, Queen Street as they grew up, all were "promised a desk in the corner of that room and their father's supervision". However, each actually began "as office boy out the back, tediously filing admission receipt dockets until they learnt to carve their own niche". They were employed in Amalgamated Theatres from when they left school in the late 1950s. On the retirement of their father and uncle, Royce became managing director and Joseph and Michael had management roles. They continued to be involved in the management of the chain from the 1960s to the 1980s. The owner of the chain, 20th Century Fox sold out in the 1980s to the Chase Corporation and then the chain came into the ownership of Hoyts which continued to employ the brothers in senior management positions. Royce Moodabe became general manager of Hoyts Australian circuit. He retired in 2006 after 57 years in the business. In 1997 Joe Moodabe joined Village Force Cinemas " ... which, as general manager, he built into the "country's biggest cinema chain". In 2006 the chain became wholly owned by SkyCity and was renamed SkyCity Cinemas. Joe Moodabe became executive chairman of an in-house board that oversaw developments in the cinema business. He died on 8 December 2019.
