= Ronald Trubuhovich =

New Zealand doctor (1929–2026)

Ronald Trubuhovich ONZM
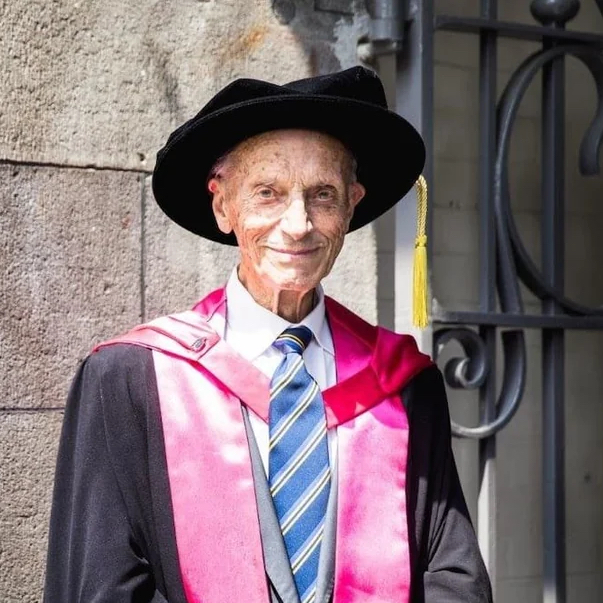
- Trubuhovich in 2019
- Born: Ronald Valentine Trubuhovich; 6 March 1929; New Plymouth, New Zealand
- Died: 16 July 2026 (aged 97); Auckland, New Zealand
- Education: University of Otago
- Medical career
- Field: Critical care medicine
- Institutions: Auckland City Hospital

Ronald Valentine Trubuhovich ONZM (6 March 1929 – 16 July 2026) was a New Zealand medical doctor, known as a pioneer of critical care medicine in New Zealand.

== Early life and education ==
Trubuhovich, who was of Dalmatian parentage, was born in New Plymouth on 6 March 1929 to Violet and Volentin Trubuhovich. After age 7, he spent his childhood in Auckland and was educated at St Peter's College of which he was dux in 1946 and 1947.

Trubuhovich studied at the University of Otago, earning the degrees of Bachelor of Dental Surgery (1953, with two distinctions in 1951), Bachelor of Medical Science (1960) and Bachelor of Medicine, Bachelor of Surgery (with distinction in physiology, 1956) (1961). He was awarded the J. Malcolm Prize in physiology in 1956 and the Geigy Essay Prize in psychiatry in 1962. He was awarded a Nuffield Dominion Scholarship to the University of Oxford and Oxford's Radcliffe Infirmary in 1964 and completed a research Master of Science degree there. In 2019 he gained his doctorate, MD, from the University of Auckland with his thesis Resuscitation and the Origins of Intensive Care/Critical Care Medicine. His specialist qualifications included FFARCS, FANZCA and fellowship of the College of Intensive Care Medicine, Australia and New Zealand.

== Medical career ==
Trubuhovich was deputy medical officer-in-charge, 1968–1983, then headed the intensive or critical care services at Auckland Hospital, being chairman of the Department of Critical Care Medicine, until obligatory formal retirement in 1994, although he continued working there for four more years. He was president of the Australian and New Zealand Intensive Care Society (1981–1982), inaugural vice-dean of the Faculty of Intensive Care, Australian & New Zealand College of Anaesthetists (1993–1996), president of the Auckland Medical History Society (2008–2009).

Trubuhovich was a published author on medical history, particularly resuscitation and intensive care medicine. With intensivist colleague James A. Judson he produced the 150-page Intensive Care in New Zealand, A History of the New Zealand Region of ANZICS in 2001 for the 40th anniversary of their unit. In 2015, he self-published a booklet on the ill-health and death of Governor William Hobson.

== Death ==
Trubuhovich died in Auckland on 16 July 2026, at the age of 97. His wife, Elizabeth Trubuhovich (née Coutts), died a few weeks later, on 24 August 2026.

== Honours and awards ==
In the 1997 Queen's Birthday Honours, Trubuhovich was appointed an Officer of the New Zealand Order of Merit, for services to medicine. In 2012, he was honoured by being named an "old boy of distinction" of his old school, St Peter's College. In 2024, Trubuhovich was invited to reopen the revamped science laboratories at St Peter's College.
