= Carmel Fisher =

New Zealand businesswoman and entrepreneur

Carmel Fisher CNZM
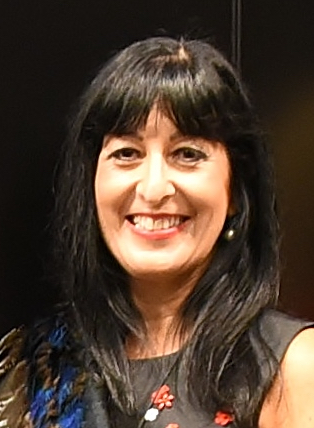
- Fisher in 2017
- Education: Victoria University of Wellington
- Occupations: Businesswoman; Entrepreneur
- Known for: Founder of Fisher Funds
- Spouse: Hugh Fisher

Carmel Miringa Fisher CNZM is a New Zealand businesswoman and entrepreneur. In 1998, Carmel and Hugh Fisher founded investment fund company Fisher Funds. Over the next two decades, Fisher Funds grew from NZD $17 million to over $8 billion to become the fifth-largest New Zealand fund management company behind the major Australian banks, far outpacing industry growth. In 2017, Fisher sold 51% of Fisher Funds to the New Zealand-owned TSB Bank.

According to the New Zealand Herald, Fisher is widely recognised as a "trailblazer" and leading investment professional, and was awarded the Companion of the New Zealand Order of Merit in the 2019 New Year Honours List for services to business. As of 2018, Carmel and her husband Hugh had an estimated net worth of $90 million. In 2016 they purchased a $22 million home on Auckland's North Shore.

== Honours, awards, and posts ==
- Winner of a 2016 Ernst & Young Entrepreneur of the Year Award in the Services category
- Inducted into the Co. of Women Hall of Fame in 2017
- Awarded an INFINZ Fellowship in 2018
- Appointed a Companion of the New Zealand Order of Merit (CNZM), for services to business, in the 2019 New Year Honours
- Board member of New Zealand Trade and Enterprise
- 2019 North Harbour Club Hall of Fame Laureate
