= Wynne Fallwell =

New Zealand fashion designer

- Born: 1933; New Zealand
- Died: 2014 (aged 80–81)
- Education: St Peter's College, Auckland
- Label: Mr Wyn Originals

(Frederick) Wynne Fallwell (1933–2014) was a noted New Zealand fashion milliner.

== Early life ==
Fallwell was born in 1933. He attended St Peters College, Epsom.

== Career ==
Fallwell worked in various millinery workshops including Fleur Millinery, a subsidiary of manufacturer Ross & Glendining. When the Dunedin-based manufacturer closed in 1965, he took over the workroom staff and commenced his own label, Mr Wyn Originals. He opened a hat shop in Canterbury Arcade, Queen Street, Auckland, near the John Courts Department Store and Fallwell's hats under that label became well known throughout New Zealand. In 1973 Wynne was selected alongside Vinka Lucas to design the uniforms for Air New Zealand. "Vinka designed a turquoise pinafore dress worn over a gold blouse with full leg-of-mutton sleeves and a tailored jacket with a navy trim. Wynne made a matching turquoise Breton hat."

With changes in fashion which saw the diminishing of the demand for hats, Fawell ceased to be involved in the fashion industry in the 1980s. A photographic collection of his hats is located in the New Zealand Fashion Museum.

== Death ==
Wynne Fallwell died in 2014.
