= Dion Nukunuku =

New Zealand softball player

Dion Nukunuku (born 20 March 1970) is a former member of the New Zealand national softball team, called "The Black Sox". He was in the teams that won the world championship in 1996, 2000 and 2004. He has continued as a coach in the sport.

== Early life ==
Nukunuku spent his childhood in Hawkes Bay and Auckland and was educated at Hastings between 1983 and 1987. Dion Nukunuku is the brother of Softball international, Nathan Nukunuku.

== Playing career ==
Nukunuku commenced paying senior level softball in 1985. From then until 1987 he was in Hawkes Bay and played for the Flaxmere and Taradale club. In 1987 he started playing for the Marist and Metro clubs in Auckland and also for the Mt Albert Ramblers. He also represented Auckland in national provincial championship winning teams. In 1989, Nukunuku was a member of New Zealand team which won the Under-19 championship Prince Edward Island, Canada. He played at second base in the final against Canada.

In 1990, Nukunuku was selected to be a member of the New Zealand Black Sox. The highlights of Nukunuku's senior international career were:

- 1990 - he was a member of the Black Sox team debut on the Canada Cup tour;
- 1992 - he was a member of the silver medal-winning world series Black Sox team in Manila, Philippines where he played second base in the final against Canada;
- 1992 - he was a member of the silver medal-winning world series Black Sox team in Manila, Philippines where he played second base in the final against Canada;
- 1996 - he was a member of the world champion Black Sox in Michigan, USA where he played shortstop in the final against Canada;
- 2000 - he was a member of the world champion Black Sox in East London, South Africa where he played second base in the final against Japan;
- 2004 - he was a member of the world champion Black Sox in Christchurch, where he played second base in final against Canada;
- 2005 - he was a member of the gold medal-winning Black Sox team at the Pacific Cup Series in Rotorua, playing second base in the final against Japan.

== Post-softball career ==
While playing softball, Nukunuku worked for Tower Insurance in Auckland, which he had done since he was 16 years old. However, in 2009 he was arrested and charged with fraud after it was discovered (after he was made redundant) that he had stolen and gambled away over $NZ450,000. He was sent to Mt Eden prison in 2009 and was released in 2011, having complete two years of his three-year sentence.
