= Christopher Mullane =

New Zealand Army officer

Christopher Mullane ONZM MBE
- Born: Auckland, New Zealand
- Military career
- Allegiance: New Zealand
- Branch: New Zealand Army
- Rank: Lieutenant Colonel
- Conflicts: Vietnam War
- Awards: Officer of the New Zealand Order of Merit; Member of the Order of the British Empire; Legion of Merit (United States)

Christopher Bernard Mullane is a retired officer of the New Zealand Army, and an advocate for veterans' affairs.

== Early life ==
Mullane spent his childhood in Auckland, New Zealand, and was educated at St Peter's College. Mullane was honoured by his old school in 2015 as an "old boy of distinction."

== Military career ==
Mullane rose to the rank of lieutenant colonel in the New Zealand Army. He served in the Vietnam War. In the mid 1970s he served as an exchange officer at the U.S. Army Infantry School, Fort Benning, Georgia. During his exchange he was appointed as Chief of the Leadership Branch, Command and Tactics Department at the School. He was awarded the Legion of Merit for "exceptional abilities and dedication to duty in each of his assignments". Mullane's contribution to the US military was in the form of a leadership manual which was widely used in the US Army. But due to an administrative oversight, even though he had the medal, the award documentation was never officially approved before Mullane returned to New Zealand. The oversight was corrected and the medal was officially presented to Mullane on 18 June 2012, 33 years after he received the medal, by United States Army Pacific deputy commander, Major General Roger Matthews.

In the 1982 Queen's Birthday Honours, Mullane was appointed a Member of the Military Division of the Order of the British Empire. In the 2009 New Year Honours, he was made an Officer of the New Zealand Order of Merit, for services to Vietnam veterans.
