= Tony Watkins =

New Zealand architect

- Born: L. Anthony Watkins; 1938 (age 87–88); Auckland, New Zealand
- Education: University of Auckland
- Occupation: Architect
- Awards: 2019 Presidents Award of the New Zealand Institute of Architects

L Anthony Watkins (born 1938) is an architect, planner, and urban designer, author and activist from New Zealand. He is emeritus professor of architecture at the University of Auckland, and a specialist in vernacular architecture.

== Early life ==
Watkins was born in 1938. He grew up in Papatoetoe, and was educated at St Peter's College, Auckland.

== Career ==
Watkins' focus is environmental and sustainable agriculture, and during his career he has participated in United Nations environmental conferences including Habitat II. He has been an advocate for the concept of kaitiakitanga in design and planning. He was a founder of International Architects Designers and Planners for Social Responsibility.

In 2012 Watkins published Thinking It Through, an collection of articles about architecture he had previously published in a home design magazine. The collection was illustrated with photos by Haruhiko Sameshima. The New Zealand Listener noted that his writing was informed by the idea that "architecture is inextricably linked to power" and said the book featured "telling observations" about New Zealand architecture.

In 2019 Watkins was honoured with the Presidents Award of the New Zealand Institute of Architects. The award citation stated that Watkins occupied "a unique place in New Zealand architecture" with "a tireless commitment to engaging with the public about architecture and reminding the profession of its societal and ethical responsibilities" including ecological protection and humane city planning.

His self-built house at Karaka Bay is a prominent example of New Zealand vernacular architecture.
