= False Start (band) =

Power pop/rock band from New Zealand

- Origin: Auckland, New Zealand
- Genres: Power pop Rock; Post-Hardcore
- Years active: 2005–2010 2017
- Label: Deadboy Records/Universal
- Members: Andrew Morrison Jim Marshall Vaughn Phillips Kevin Roberts David Wong
- Past members: Andrew Morrison; Ashley Wills; Pascal Jary; Craigen Durrant; Jim Marshall; Kev Roberts; David Wong; Vaughn Phillips

False Start was a power pop/rock band from Auckland, New Zealand, that formed in the winter of 2005. They were signed to Deadboy Records/Universal. The band is known for its song "Don't Walk Away" from its Goodbye Summer EP.

== History ==
In June 2005, False Start won the Henderson regional heat of Battle of the Bands, going on to claim first equal in the Primal final, out of over a hundred Auckland bands. Adding to their early success, False Start's Goodbye Summer EP sold out on the first night of sales, their record debuting at No. 3 on the Real Groovy National chart. Shortly after False Start signed to Deadboy Records with distribution/backing from Universal Music NZ.

They released their first single, "Don't Walk Away" from the EP titled Goodbye Summer EP and a mini album entitled Adore Tu Ser..... There is also a four-track acoustic mini album titled Tealight For Burma.

Since forming their band, False Start have shared the stage with numerous local and international acts such as Fall Out Boy, Good Charlotte, Story of the Year, Funeral for a Friend, Aiden, Rise Against, The Used and many more. They have also toured extensively throughout New Zealand and Australia.

False Start played at the Auckland Big Day Out 2008 on the Local Produce Stage. False Start also did a cover of "4ever" by The Veronicas.

In August 2008, False Start released their second studio album named Through The Looking Glass which includes the single "Four Letter Lie". The band opened for Escape The Fate in support of this album.

In September 2008, Vaughn announced he was leaving along with David a few months later in November.

On 3 June 2010, False Start posted on their Myspace that 2010 would be their last year as a band before breaking up, each member going their separate ways.

False Start reunited with the original lineup in April 2017 for a show in Auckland.

== Discography ==
=== Studio albums ===
- Adore Tu Ser
- Through The Looking Glass

=== EPs ===
- Goodbye Summer EP
- Beginnings...

=== Other albums ===
- Tealight For Burma

=== Singles ===
Year	Title	Peak chart positions	Album
Year	Title	NZ	Album
2007	"Mall Goth"	—	Adore Tu Ser
2007	"This Is My Life (But You're The Worst of Actors)"	—	Adore Tu Ser
2008	"Get Your Feelings Out"	—	Through The Looking Glass
2008	"Four Letter Lie"	—	Through The Looking Glass
2008	"What Will It Be Like"	—	Through The Looking Glass
2009	"I Come From a Place"	—	Through The Looking Glass
2009	"Veins"	—	Through The Looking Glass
"—" denotes a recording that did not chart or was not released in that territory.

== Band members ==
- Andrew Morrison – Vocals
- Jim Marshall – Guitar
- Kev Roberts – Drums
- David Wong – Bass
- Vaughn Phillips – Guitar

=== Past members ===
- Ashley Wills
- Pascal Jarry
- Craigen Durrant
