= Peter Hurley (doctor) =

New Zealand doctor (1940–1983)

Peter John Hurley (6 January 1940 – 16 August 1983) was a New Zealand doctor. He was the first full-time physician in nuclear medicine at Auckland Hospital in 1972 and he established the Department of Nuclear Medicine there between 1971 and 1982. He "was one of the most gifted young physicians of his generation".

== Early life ==
Hurley was born in Bathurst, New South Wales. His family moved to Auckland when he was four. He was educated at Good Shepherd School, Balmoral and then at St Peter's College where he was Dux in 1956 and gained a Junior National University Scholarship. After his intermediate year at the University of Auckland he went to Dunedin and was enrolled at the Otago Medical School. He was president of Aquinas Hall of Residence and graduated with a distinction. Thereafter, he became a house surgeon and registrar at Auckland Hospital.

== Medical career ==
Hurley was first appointed as a medical registrar in the Department of Medicine at Auckland Hospital. In 1962 he became involved in lipoprotein work and this initiated his interest in radioisotopes. In 1968, Hurley was a research fellow in the medical unit, Auckland Hospital. From 1969 for three years, he was research assistant in nuclear medicine and fellow at Johns Hopkins University, Baltimore. He was a co-author of some journal articles. Nuclear medicine had developed in a piecemeal fashion in Auckland and it became necessary that the different independent units merge into a totally integrated electronics service with a Nuclear medicine Physician to guide it. When he returned to Auckland in 1972, Hurley was appointed as head of the department of Nuclear Medicine. He was instrumental in its staffing and development and the advancement of its academic reputation. In 1981 he was awarded the Johns Hopkins Nuclear Medicine Distinguished Alumnus award.

== Personal ==
Hurley was very interested in music and was a pianist. He was also a singer and was a member of the Dorian Singers in Auckland. He participated in two overseas tours with that group. When he was a student he acted in plays. He died on 16 August 1983 in Auckland at the age of 43.
