= George Baloghy =

New Zealand artist

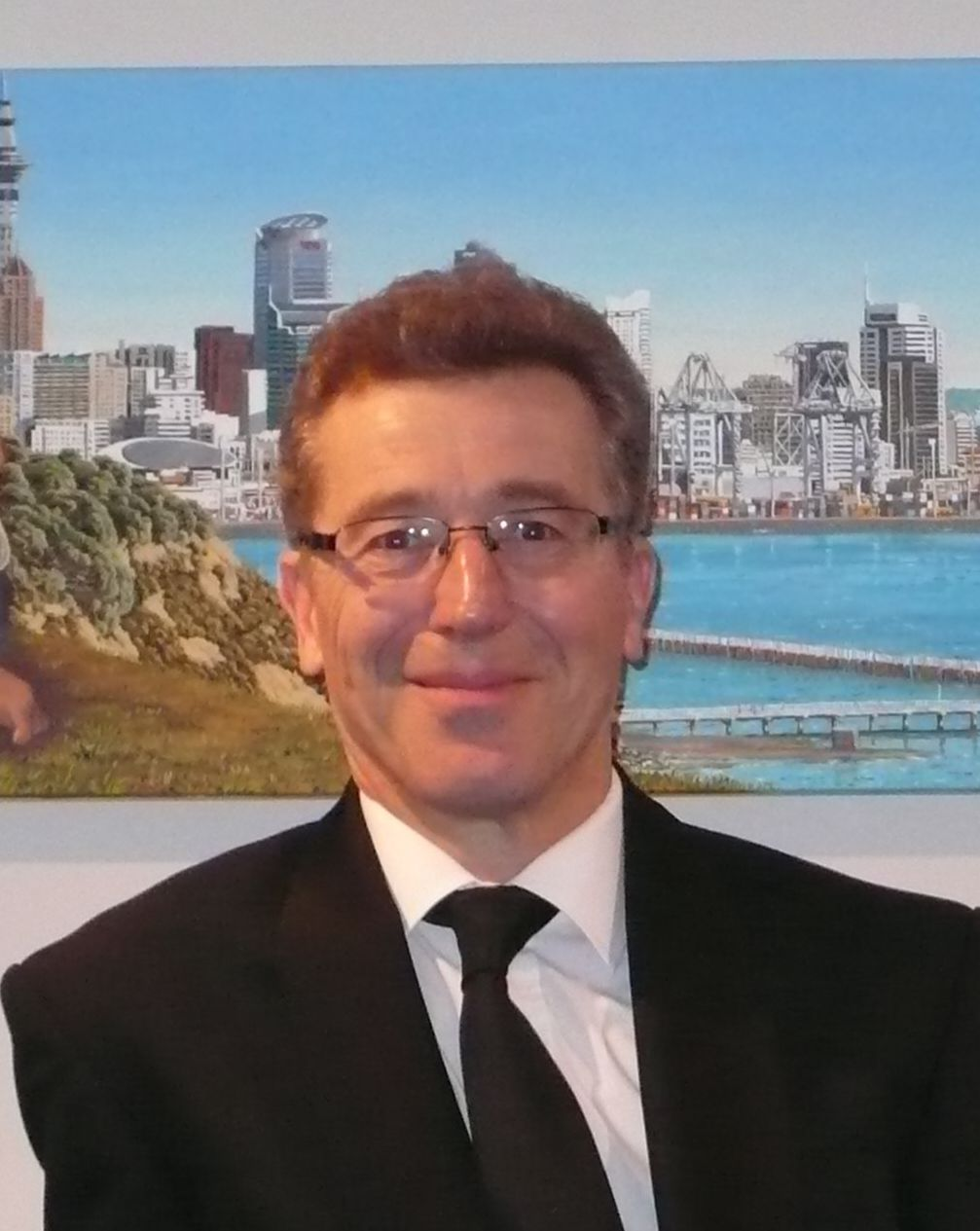
- Baloghy at an exhibition in 2009
- Born: Baloghy György; April 20, 1950 (age 75); Budapest, Hungary
- Known for: Painter
- Movement: Realism
- Awards: Tokoroa Art Award (1980); QE2 Arts Council Studio Grant (1982); QE2 Arts Council Travel Grant (1985)

George Baloghy (Hungarian: Baloghy György, born 20 April 1950) is a prominent New Zealand artist. He is a painter, preferring to paint with oil on canvas.

== Biography ==
He was born in 1950 in Budapest, Hungary and emigrated to New Zealand in 1956 as a refugee. He was educated at St Peter's College, Auckland and at the University of Auckland from which he graduated Bachelor of Fine Arts from the Elam School of Fine Arts in 1977. He has had 27 major solo exhibitions in New Zealand and Australia, commencing in 1978.

Baloghy's style can be called a particular kind of realism, where major elements are altered and shifted around for dramatic effect. Some of these paintings are close to fiction, yet attempt to narrate a greater truth of the feeling of place. The realism depicted has been described by John Daly-Peoples as being more like paintings of models of the landscape. Heightened edges and colours produce a sharpness of detail and an atmosphere that is at once familiar, yet faintly alien. Many of his works contain references to other painters and paintings.

Baloghy lives and works in Auckland and Hahei Beach on the Coromandel Peninsula. Many of the subjects of his paintings are in those places. In 2007 he completed a major series of paintings of Wellington subjects.

Baloghy then focused on iconic pieces of New Zealand art, producing parodic interpretations of signature New Zealand regional paintings such as Robin White's Mangaweka and Christopher Perkin's 1931 painting Taranaki. In painting these works Baloghy has intimately studied the painting techniques of several important New Zealand artists such as Colin McCahon, Don Binney, Rita Angus and Bill Hammond and replicated it with himself (and his car) located in their works. Some of the artists parodied have themselves been students of Baloghy.

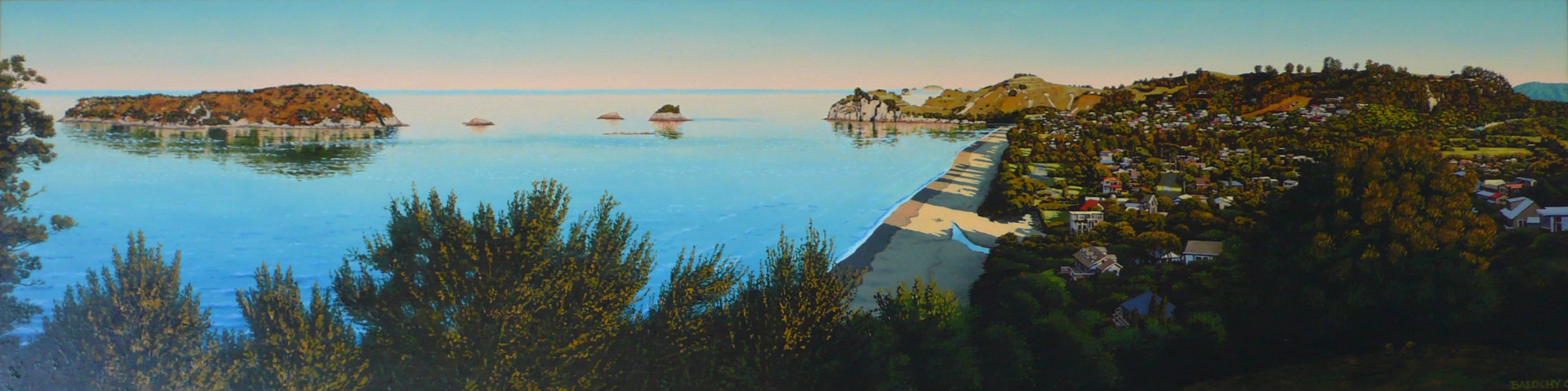
Evening light

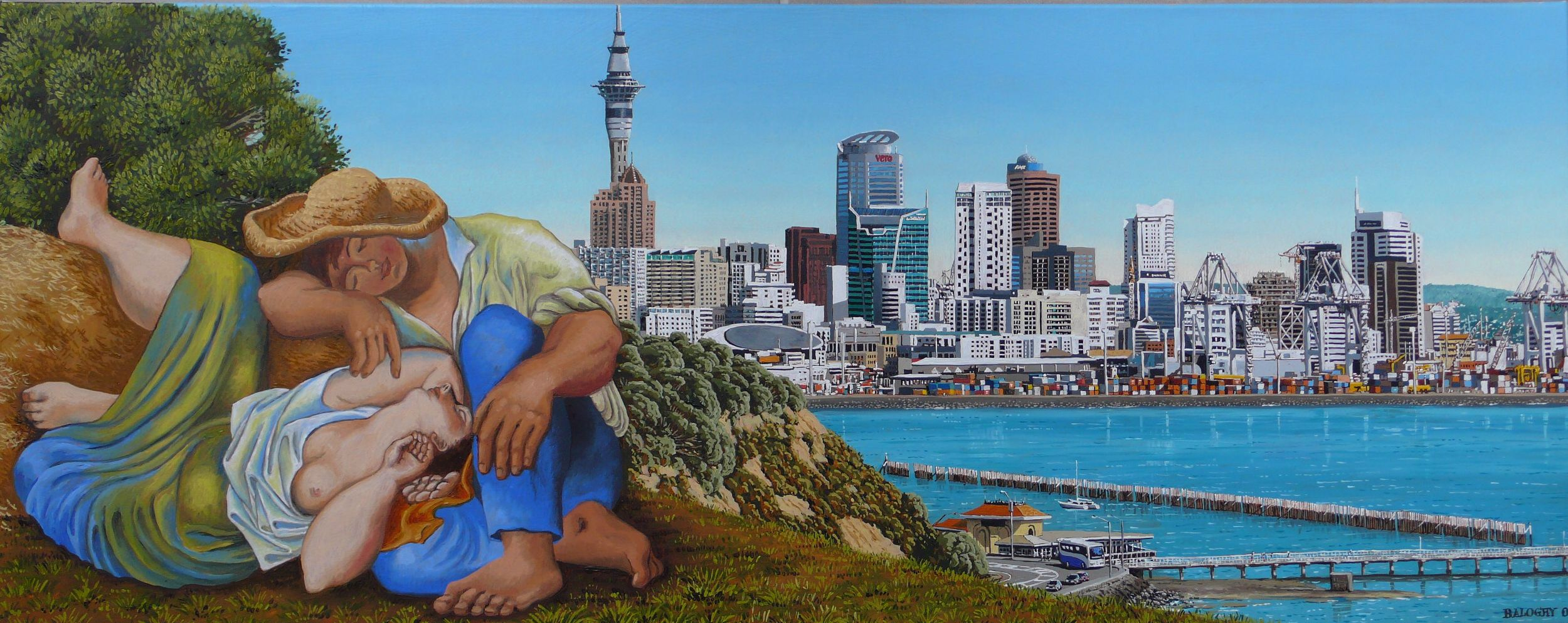
A picture from the Picasso in Auckland-series

In a return to his Auckland roots, Baloghy's most recent works have chronicled areas of Auckland City over the past one hundred years, highlighting the minutest of details, from the spectacular to the mundane, and often placing anachronistic classical buildings, objects or scenes or copies of other artists' paintings in the Auckland locations.
