= Brian O'Flaherty =

New Zealand horse-racing and equestrian journalist and administrator

Brian Desmond O'Flaherty (born Wellington 1 November 1938) is a New Zealand horse-racing and equestrian journalist, television equestrian sports commentator and equestrian sports administrator. He was executive director of the NZ Thoroughbred Breeders' Association until 1996.

== Early life ==
O'Flaherty was educated at St Peter's College, Auckland and Opotiki College.

== Career ==
He was a journalist for 33 years in Auckland, Bay of Plenty, Wellington and Manawatu. He worked for The Dominion for 20 years, with 13 years as Racing Editor. He was commentator for TVNZ for equestrian events at the 1984 Los Angeles Olympic Games (where he excitedly called "that's Todd for two, and two for Todd!"), the 1988 Seoul Olympic Games, the 1992 Barcelona Olympic Games and the 2000 Sydney Olympic Games. O'Flaherty had important roles with horse racing and other equestrian organisations and he was executive director of the NZ Thoroughbred Breeders' Association from 1988 to 1996. He was instrumental in the setting up the Ministerial inquiry into race betting systems which led to the Racing Industry Board replacing the Racing Authority. He launched the inward-buyer programme to halt a slide in sale prices for horses.
