= Jan Kohlhaase =

German mathematician

Jan Kohlhaase (born 1976) is a German mathematician specialising in the representation theory of p-adic Lie groups and arithmetic geometry.

== Education and career ==
From 1997 to 2002, Kohlhaase studied mathematics and physics at the University of Hamburg and at Purdue University. In 2005 he obtained his PhD at the University of Münster under the supervision of Peter Schneider. He subsequently worked at IHES, the University of Münster as well as the University of Heidelberg. Kohlhaase habilitated at the University of Münster in 2011, and was appointed professor for arithmetic geometry at the University of Duisburg-Essen in 2014.
