= Nathan Nukunuku =

New Zealand softball player

Nathan Nukunuku (born 8 May 1980) is a member of the New Zealand national softball team, called "The Black Sox" since 1999 and has been the captain since 2013.

== Early life and school ==
Nukunuku spent his childhood in Hawkes Bay and Auckland and was educated at St Peter's College, which has traditionally been very prominent in the Auckland school boy Softball competitions. Nukunuku played Rugby union as well as Softball at St Peter's. He was in the First XV in his last years there. He was a member of the St Peter's senior Softball team which was the Auckland secondary schools champion in 1997, 1998 and 1999. St Peter's was second in the 1997 and 1998 New Zealand Secondary Schools competition but won the championship in the 1999 competition. While still at school, Nukunuku was a member of the Auckland Under 19 team which was the New Zealand Under 19s champion in 1996, 1997 and 1998, and was second in 1999. Nathan Nukunuku is the brother of former Softball international, Dion Nukunuku.

== Career ==
Nukunuku first joined the Black Sox in 1999. He played in three world champion Back Sox teams at shortstop, at second base and outfield in 2013. In 2015 he was an outfielder and in 2017 he was deployed at first base. In the 2019 championships in Prague he is projected to primarily be in a hitting role and first base. In 2019 he retains a high slot in the batting order. This reflects "his reputation as one of the world's top hitters." He has also retained some speed (nearing his 39th birthday). "Nukunuku has had extensive experience as a player-coach, leading Auckland to a raft of national provincial titles (11 in the last 16 years) and [his team] Ramblers to back-to-back national club crowns in 2018 and 2019." He has been the Black Sox captain since 2013. Nukunuku played for North American clubs 2006 to 2012, usually on short-term contracts and he was a member of the International Softball Congress all world team four times. He won a title with County Materials in Wisconsin in 2006.

== Record ==
=== Junior international career ===
- 1997 - member of the New Zealand Junior Black Sox - World Series (team won the silver medal).

=== Senior career ===
- 2001 - for the Pakuranga Pacers club - won the Auckland Competition.
- 2001 - for the Auckland Marist club - at national tournaments - third equal in New Zealand Clubs competition.
- 2002 - for the Auckland Marist club - Auckland Champions and second in New Zealand Clubs competition.
- 2003 - for the Mt Albert Ramblers club - Auckland and New Zealand Champions.
- 2004 - for the Mt Albert Ramblers club - third at the New Zealand Clubs competition.
- 2005 - for the Mt Albert Ramblers club - Auckland and New Zealand Champions.
- 2006 - for the Mt Albert Ramblers club - Auckland Champions and third equal at the New Zealand Clubs competition.
- 2007 - for the Mt Albert Ramblers club - Auckland and New Zealand Champions.
- 2009 - for the Mt Albert Ramblers club - Auckland and New Zealand Champions.
- 2018 - for the Mt Albert Ramblers club - Auckland and New Zealand Champions.
- 2019 - for the Mt Albert Ramblers club - Auckland and New Zealand Champions.

=== Senior National Career ===
- 1996 - member of the Auckland Colts (Under 23) - New Zealand Champions.
- 2001 - member of the Auckland Men's Team - second at the New Zealand Provincials Championship competition.
- 2002 - member of the Auckland Men's Team - New Zealand Provincial Champions.
- 2003 - March - member of the Auckland National League Team - New Zealand Champions.
- 2003 - December - member of the Auckland National League Team - New Zealand Champions.
- 2005 - member of the Auckland National League Team.
- 2006 - member of the Auckland National League Team.
- 2007 - member of the Auckland National League Team - New Zealand Champions.
- 2008 - member of the Auckland National League Team - New Zealand Champions.
- 2009 - member of the Auckland National League Team - New Zealand Champions.

The Auckland National League team has won 11 championships in the last 16 years (as at 2019).

=== Senior international career ===
- 1998 - selected for the NZ Black Sox (but had to withdraw due to St Peter's College Rugby commitments).
- 1999 - in the NZ Black Sox for tour of Japan.
- 2000 - in the NZ Black Sox for the World Series (NZ Black Sox were the Champions).
- 2000 - in the NZ Black Sox for tour of Australia.
- 2001 - in the NZ Black Sox for tour of New Zealand.
- 2002 - in the NZ Black Sox.
- 2003 - in the NZ Black Sox for tour of Botswana.
- 2004 - in the NZ Black Sox for the World Series (NZ Black Sox were the Champions).
- 2005 - in the NZ Black Sox for the Pacific Series (NZ Black Sox were the Champions)
- 2006 - in the NZ Black Sox for tour of Canada (NZ Black Sox won the test series against Canada).
- 2006 - in the NZ Black Sox for the Commonwealth Series (NZ Black Sox were the Champions)
- 2007 - in the NZ Black Sox for the Pacific Series (NZ Black Sox were the Champions).
- 2008 - in the NZ Black Sox (Nukunuku unavailable for Pacific Series - NZ Black Sox placed 2nd)
- 2008 - in the NZ Black Sox - Oceania Qualifying Tournament (NZ Black Sox were the Champions).
- 2009 - in the NZ Black Sox - Pacific Series (NZ Black Sox were the Champions).
- 2009 - in the NZ Black Sox - World Series.
- 2010 - in the NZ Black Sox - New Zealand Tour
- 2011 - in the NZ Black Sox - European tour
- 2012 - in the NZ Black Sox - South America Tour
- 2013 - in the NZ Black Sox - world championship competition (March 2013)
- 2015 - in the NZ Black Sox - world championship competition
- 2017 - in the NZ Black Sox - world championship competition
