= Mark Williams (writer) =

New Zealand poet, writer, academic (born 1951)

Clifton Mark Williams (born 12 October 1951) is a New Zealand poet, writer, academic, critic, editor of contemporary New Zealand literature. He holds a MA (Hons) from the University of Auckland and a Ph.D. (1983) from the University of British Columbia. He is emeritus Professor of English at Victoria University of Wellington.

== St Peter's College ==
Williams was educated at St Peter's College, Auckland. He has written about his reaction to St Peter's after his Christadelphian background. "To me, on coming from a radically iconoclastic Protestant sect, the holy pictures and statues the Christian Brothers had crammed on every wall seemed utterly bizarre. .... At midday we all knelt for the Angelus. Mass involved long periods of kneeling." Although he feels he escaped "the deep imprinting on the psyche of Catholic guilt", Williams was captivated by "those gothic images and rigid doctrines": "An absolute scale of values and vision is insinuated into one's mind" which may account "for the number of Catholics who become writers or artists". While at St Peter's College, Williams started writing poetry and he entered a poetry contest judged by old-boy poet Sam Hunt, who wrote to him in response to his entry.

== Academic career ==
Williams returned to New Zealand from his doctoral studies at the University of British Columbia (1983) and lectured at Auckland University and Waikato University before moving to the University of Canterbury, where he was a lecturer and associate professor. He joined the English faculty at Victoria University of Wellington in 2008, and became Professor of English there. Williams's research focused on New Zealand and modern literature. He was on the editorial boards of numerous scholarly journals, including the Journal of Commonwealth Literature and Canadian Literature. In 2009, he was the convenor of the judging panel for the Montana New Zealand Book Awards. He was one of the editors of The World Novel to 1950, a volume of the Oxford University Press series The History of the Novel in English. in 2019, he was engaged in writing a novel based on his youthful experience of the Christadelphian religion.

== Contribution to New Zealand literature ==
Williams is one of the first academics to focus his publications predominantly on contemporary New Zealand writing. His work is also informed by a strong international context, which has enabled him to argue in Leaving the Highway: Six Contemporary New Zealand Novelists (1990) against the "violent dualities" of New Zealand culture and the "binary habits of New Zealand criticism" and advocate instead independence, difference, continuities, and "complex wholeness".

In November 2012, with his wife and fellow Victoria academic, Jane Stafford, Williams published a major anthology of New Zealand literature.

== Works ==
- Mark Williams publications, Victoria University of Wellington (accessed 14 May 2010).

== Notable student ==
- Michalia Arathimos – Greek–New Zealand writer
