= Eddie Kohlhase =

New Zealand softball player

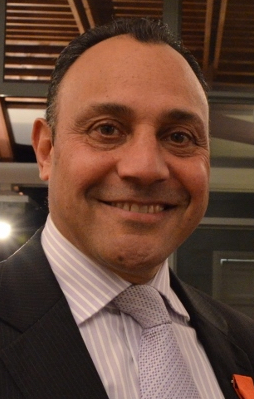
Kohlhase in 2014

Edwin Kohlhase MNZM is a former member of the New Zealand National Softball team, called the "Black Sox" and he is the current coach of the Black Sox, beginning his tenure in 2004.

== Early life ==
Kohlhase spent his childhood in Auckland and was educated at St Peter's College, which has traditionally been very prominent in the Auckland school boy softball competitions.

== Career ==
Kohlhase played many different sports as a youngster, but was especially drawn to the fast-paced nature of softball. He joined the Black Sox in 1983 and played in three international championships. New Zealand won the 1984 event, and was placed second in 1988 and 1992. An injury forced his retirement in 1995, but he quickly moved into coaching, and was appointed assistant national coach in 1998. The New Zealand team won the world championships in 1996 and 2000, and, in Christchurch, in 2004. He was appointed coach of the Black Sox in 2004. In 2013 after the Black Sox again won the world championship in that year Kohlhase indicated that he would retire as coach of the national team and that it "was probably time to move on". In announcing that he would step down he pointed out that he had been involved with the game for 30 years. Kohlase made history as the first New Zealander to win world championships as a player and a coach. Kohlhase has said: '"Coaching at the elite level in sport is all about having a vision, devising a game plan, picking and moulding players to achieve that plan, and working with other professionals to develop players' full potential". In 2013 (his retirement year) after the Black Sox had won their sixth world title, Kohlhase stated that he wanted Softball New Zealand to institute an integrated development plan to ensure New Zealand stays at the pinnacle of the international men's game. Samoan softball team coach, Chris Kohlhase is Eddie Kohlhase's brother.

In the 2014 Queen's Birthday Honours, Kohlhase was appointed a Member of the New Zealand Order of Merit, for services to softball.
