= Chris Kohlhase =

New Zealand softball player/coach and rugby union footballer

Christopher Paul Kohlhase (23 December 1967 – 29 May 2015) was a New Zealand softball player and coach. A member of the New Zealand National Softball team, called the "Black Sox", he later became the coach of the Samoan softball team.

== Early life and family ==
Born in Auckland in 1967, Kohlhase was the son of New Zealand softball representative Eric Kohlhase and his wife Ellen, and the younger brother of Eddie Kohlhase, who also played softball for New Zealand. He spent his childhood in Auckland and was educated at St Peter's College.

Although mainly noted as a softballer, Kohlhase was also an accomplished rugby union player, being a member of the Marist side that won the Gallaher Shield as Auckland senior club champions in 1991.

== Softball career ==
Kohlhase joined the Black Sox in the late 1980s and played in international championships. He was appointed coach of the Samoan team which beat the Black Sox (coached by his brother Eddie) at the Pacific championships in 2005.

Kohlhase died in Auckland in 2015.
