= List of war cemeteries and memorials on the Gallipoli Peninsula =

This is a list of all cemeteries and memorials erected following the Battle of Gallipoli in 1915 during World War I. There is one French cemetery, 31 Commonwealth War Graves Commission cemeteries containing mainly dead from Britain, Australia, New Zealand, India and Newfoundland, and over 50 memorials, grave sites and cemeteries dedicated to the Turkish casualties.

== Helles ==
=== Cemeteries ===
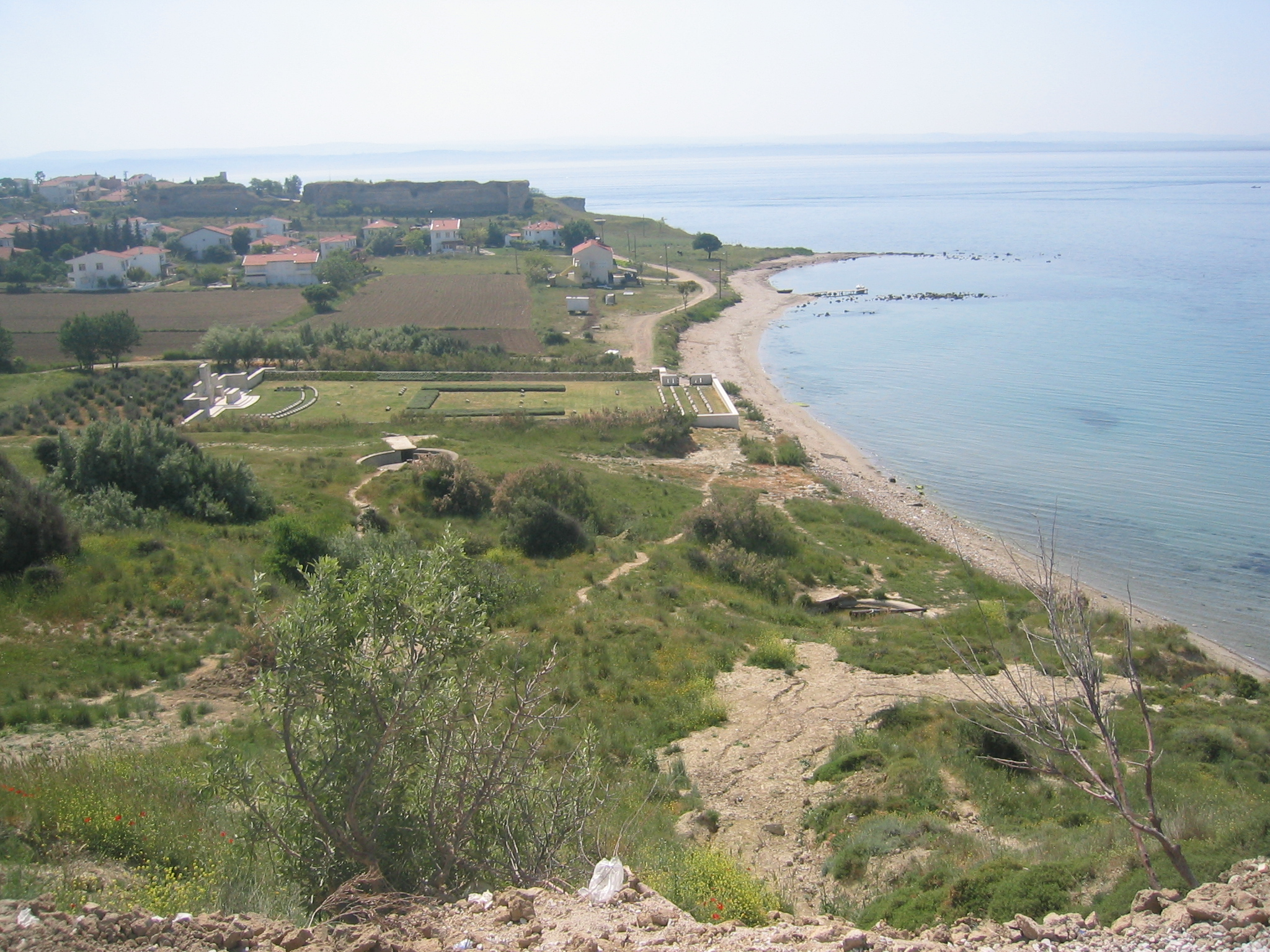
V Beach and its cemetery

- Allied
  - French War Cemetery
  - Lancashire Landing Cemetery
  - Pink Farm Cemetery
  - Redoubt Cemetery
  - Skew Bridge Cemetery
  - Twelve Tree Copse Cemetery
  - V Beach Cemetery
- Turkish
  - Alçıtepe Mass Grave
  - Seddülbahir Ammunition Dump's Cemetery (mass grave)
  - Onion Valley Turkish War Cemetery

There is only one solitary marked Allied grave outside of a cemetery on the peninsula resulting from the campaign, that of Lieutenant Colonel Charles Doughty-Wylie. He was buried close to where he was killed during the capture of Seddülbahir on the morning of April 26, 1915.

There are several isolated Turkish graves, those of Soldier Halil Ibrahim, Lt-Colonel Hasan and 2nd Lieutenant Mustafa.

=== Memorials ===
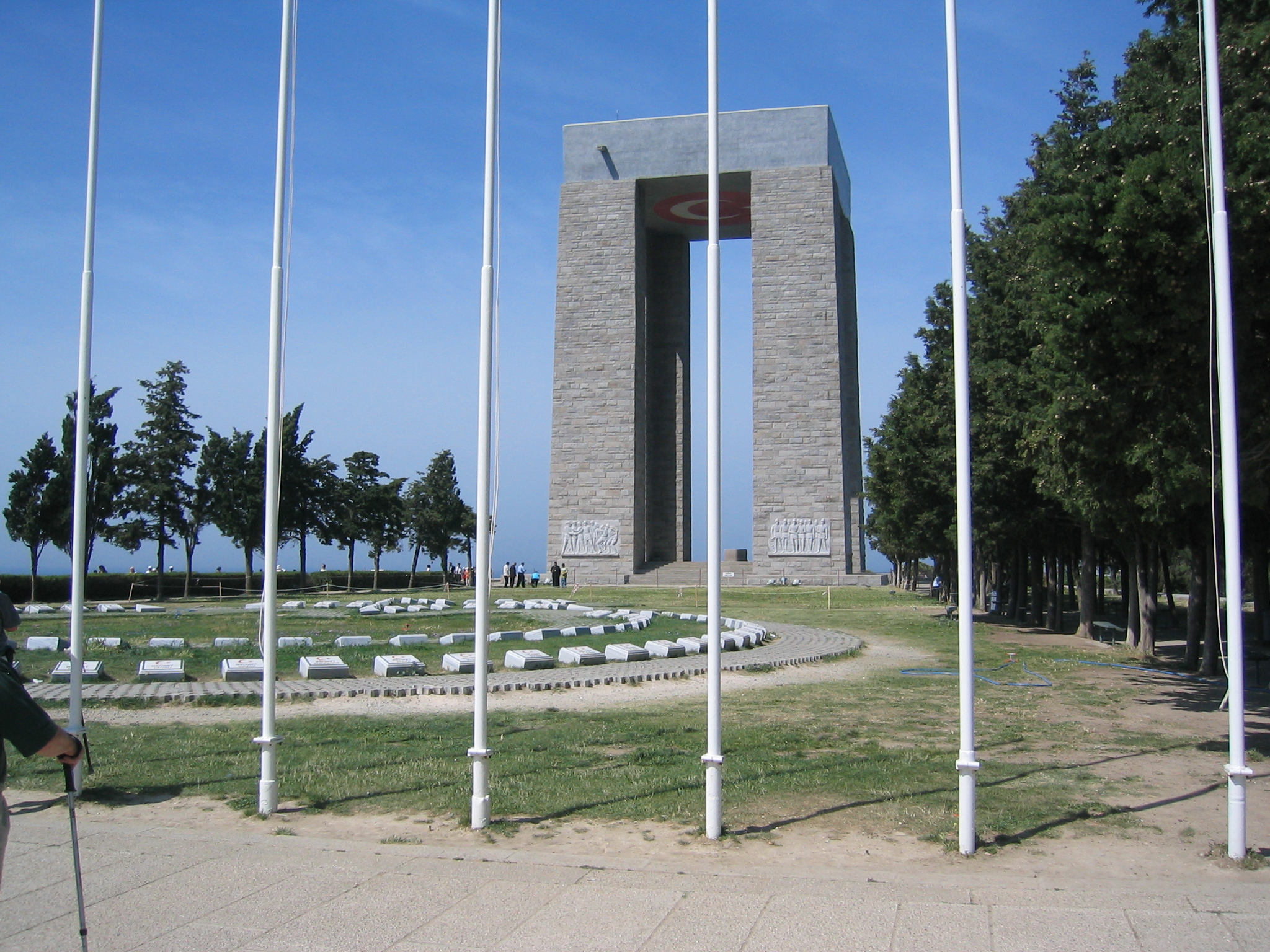
Çanakkale Martyrs' Memorial

- Allied
  - Cape Helles Memorial to the Missing – Britain and the British Commonwealth (except New Zealand).
  - France – French War Cemetery Memorial, Morto Bay – France
  - The New Zealand Memorials to the Missing in Hill 60 Cemetery, Lone Pine Cemetery, Twelve Tree Copse Cemetery and on Chunuk Bair.
  - The memorial to Eric Duckworth in Redoubt Cemetery is unique in the peninsula as a private memorial within a CWGC cemetery
- Turkish
  - Çanakkale Martyrs' Memorial
  - 18 March 1915 Memorial
  - Alçıtepe Garrison War Memorial
  - First Martyrs Memorial
  - Gully Ravine Nuri Yamut Memorial
  - Gully Ravine Field Dressing Post Memorial & Cemetery
  - Gully Ravine Turkish Soldiers Memorial
  - Last Arrow Memorial
  - Marshal Fevzi Çakmak's War Memorial
  - Sergeant Yahya Memorial

== Anzac ==
=== Cemeteries ===
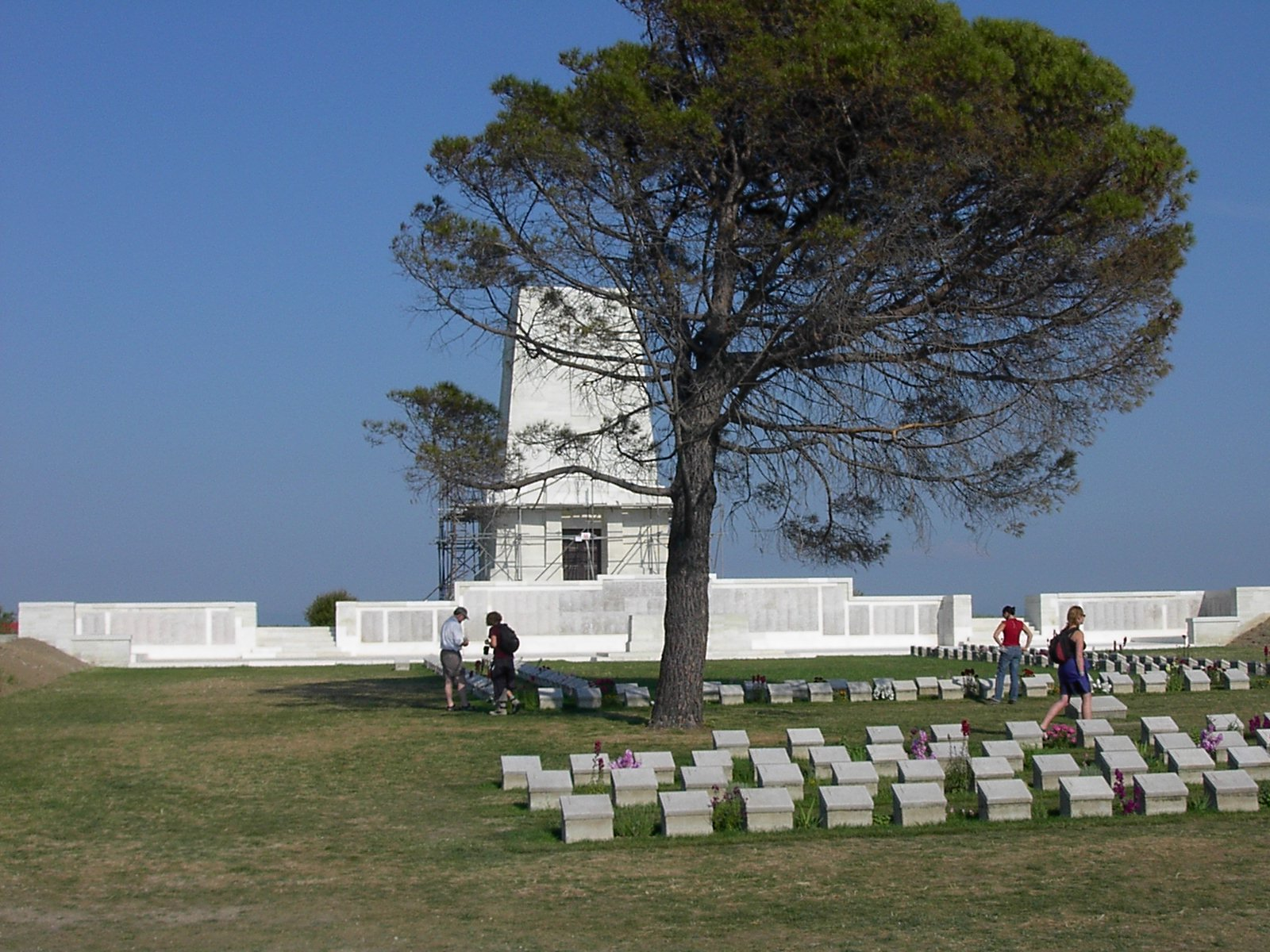
The New Zealand memorial and cemetery at Lone Pine

- Allied
  - 4th Battalion Parade Ground Cemetery
  - 7th Field Ambulance Cemetery
  - Ari Burnu Cemetery
  - Baby 700 Cemetery
  - Beach Cemetery
  - Canterbury Cemetery
  - Chunuk Bair Cemetery
  - Courtney's and Steel's Post Cemetery
  - Embarkation Pier Cemetery
  - Hill 60 Cemetery
  - Johnston's Jolly Cemetery
  - Lone Pine Cemetery
  - No. 2 Outpost Cemetery
  - New Zealand No. 2 Outpost Cemetery
  - Plugge's Plateau Cemetery
  - Quinn's Post Cemetery
  - Shell Green Cemetery
  - Shrapnel Valley Cemetery
  - The Farm Cemetery
  - The Nek Cemetery
  - Walker's Ridge Cemetery
- Turkish
  - Karayörük Valley Cemetery
  - 57th Infantry Regiment Memorial
  - Kesikdere Cemetery
  - Çataldere Cemetery
  - Kocadere Hospital Memorial and Cemetery

There are also isolated Turkish graves belonging to Lt-Colonel Hussein Manastir, Captain Mehmet and First Lt Nazif Çakmak.

=== Memorials ===
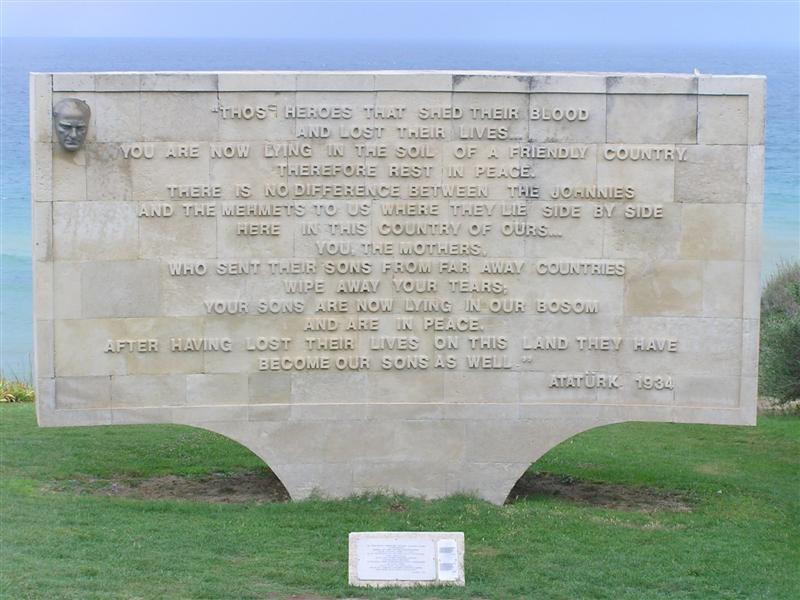
Ari Burnu Memorial

- Allied
  - Chunuk Bair – New Zealand
  - Lone Pine Memorial – Australia and New Zealand
  - Hill 60 – New Zealand
- Turkish
  - Sergeant Mehmet's Memorial
  - Chunuk Bair Soldiers’ Memorial
  - Chunuk Bair Atatürk Memorial
  - Scrubby Knoll Turkish War Memorial
- Turkish War Memorial at The Nek
  - Kabatepe (Gaba Tepe) Info Centre & Memorials
  - 27th Regiments' Queensland Point Memorial
  - Ari Burnu Memorial
  - Damakçilik Bair Memorial
  - Lone Pine Memorial (Turkish)
  - Respect to Turkish Soldiers Memorial
  - Respect to Enemy Soldier's Memorial
  - Chunuk Bair Unknown Soldiers' Memorial & Grave

== Suvla ==
=== Cemeteries ===
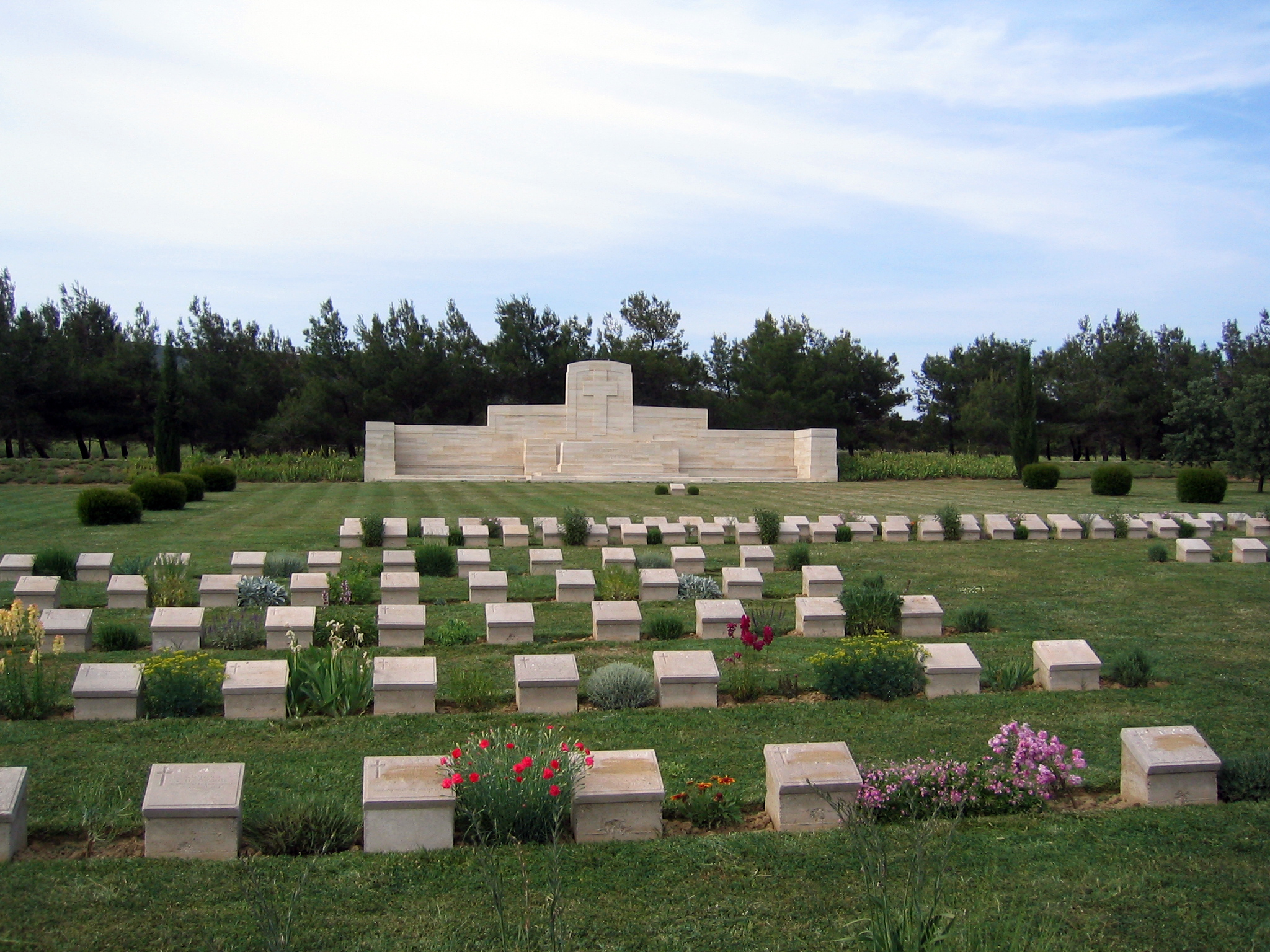
Azmak Cemetery near Suvla Bay

- Allied
  - Azmak Cemetery
  - Green Hill Cemetery
  - Hill 10 Cemetery
  - Lala Baba Cemetery
- Turkish
  - 1st Lt Halid & 2 Lt Ali Riza's Graves
  - 1st Lt Hasan Tahsin & Regtl Mufti's Graves
  - Kireçtepe Gendarmes Cemetery
  - Lt Colonel Halit & Ziya's Graves
  - Pine Monastery Cemetery

There is also a single isolated marked Turkish grave, belonging to a German nurse, Erica Ragip, the wife of a medical officer, who was killed by a howitzer shell.

=== Memorials ===
- Allied
  - Gallipoli Newfoundland Memorial
- Turkish
  - Scimitar Hill Memorial
  - Suvla Point Memorial
  - Kireçtepe Memorial

== European bank of the Dardanelles ==
- Turkish
  - Kilitbahir Castle (Fort)
  - Akbas Cemetery and Memorial
  - National Park Main Information Centre Memorials
  - A Captain's Grave
  - Çamburnu Martyr's Memorial
  - An Artillery Captain's Grave
  - Captain Tahir's Memorial
  - "Stop Traveller" Memorial
  - Corporal Seyit’s Statue
  - Mecidiye Cemetery and Memorial
  - Havuzlar Cemetery and Memorial

== Asian bank of the Dardanelles ==
These are included for completeness, although they are located just across the Dardanelles from the peninsula. They also commemorate aspects of the Gallipoli Campaign.

- Turkish
  - Hasan-Mevsuf Battery Cemetery
  - Kumkale Plain Intepe Battery Cemetery
  - Replica of the minelayer Nusret
