= Hill 60 =

Hill 60 may refer to:

- Battle of Hill 60 (disambiguation), a name shared by two battles of World War I:
  - Battle of Hill 60 (Western Front) (April 17–April 22, 1915), fought south of Ypres in Belgium
  - Battle of Hill 60 (Gallipoli) (August 21–August 29, 1915), the last major assault of the Battle of Gallipoli
- Hill 60 (Ypres), geographical feature and World War I battle site near Ypres, Belgium
- Hill 60 in Roundhay Park, Leeds, named in honour of those who had died in the WWI battles around Ypres
- Hill 60, Port Kembla is a World War II fortification in Port Kembla, New South Wales, Australia
- "Hill 60" (The Unit), an episode of the television series The Unit
- Hill 60 Commonwealth War Graves Commission Cemetery, cemetery dating from World War I at the Northern end of the former Anzac sector of the Gallipoli Peninsula, Turkey
