= Carew Reynell =

Carew Reynell may refer to:

- Carew Reynell (politician) (1563–1624), English courtier, soldier and politician
- Carew Reynell (writer) (1636–1690), English economic writer
- Carew Reynell (bishop) (1698–1745), Anglican bishop
- Carew Reynell (winemaker) (1883–1915), Australian winemaker
