= Walter Balmer Hislop =

Scottish painter (1886–1915)

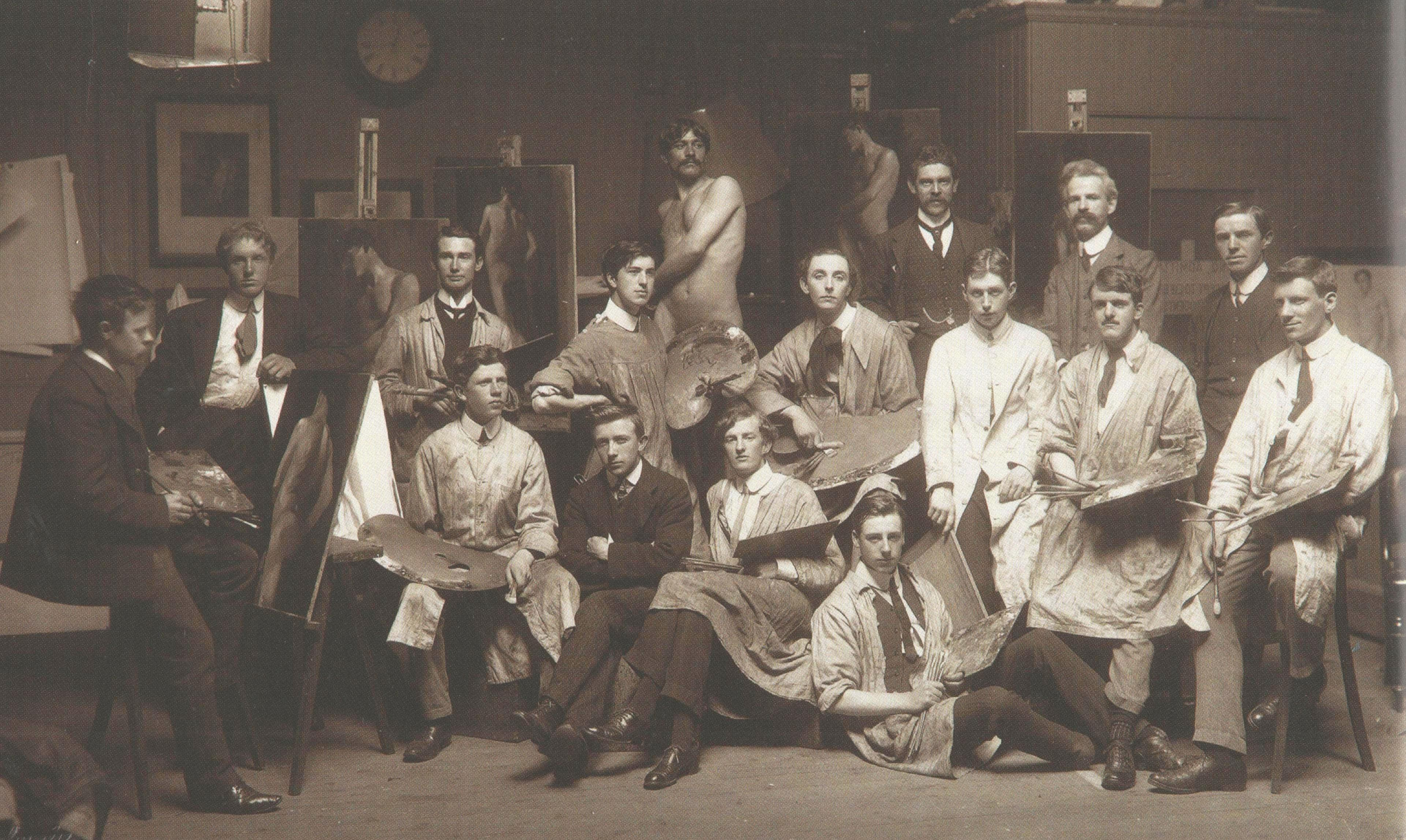
- Life Class, School of Art at the Royal Institution, on the Mound, Edinburgh (1908). Adam Bruce Thomson is third from the left, and Walter Balmer Hislop is standing fourth from the left.
- Born: Walter Balmer Hislop; 26 November 1886; Edinburgh, Scotland
- Died: 28 April 1915 (aged 28); Gallipoli, Ottoman Turkey
- Cause of death: Killed in action
- Education: Edinburgh College of Art
- Known for: Painting, Art education

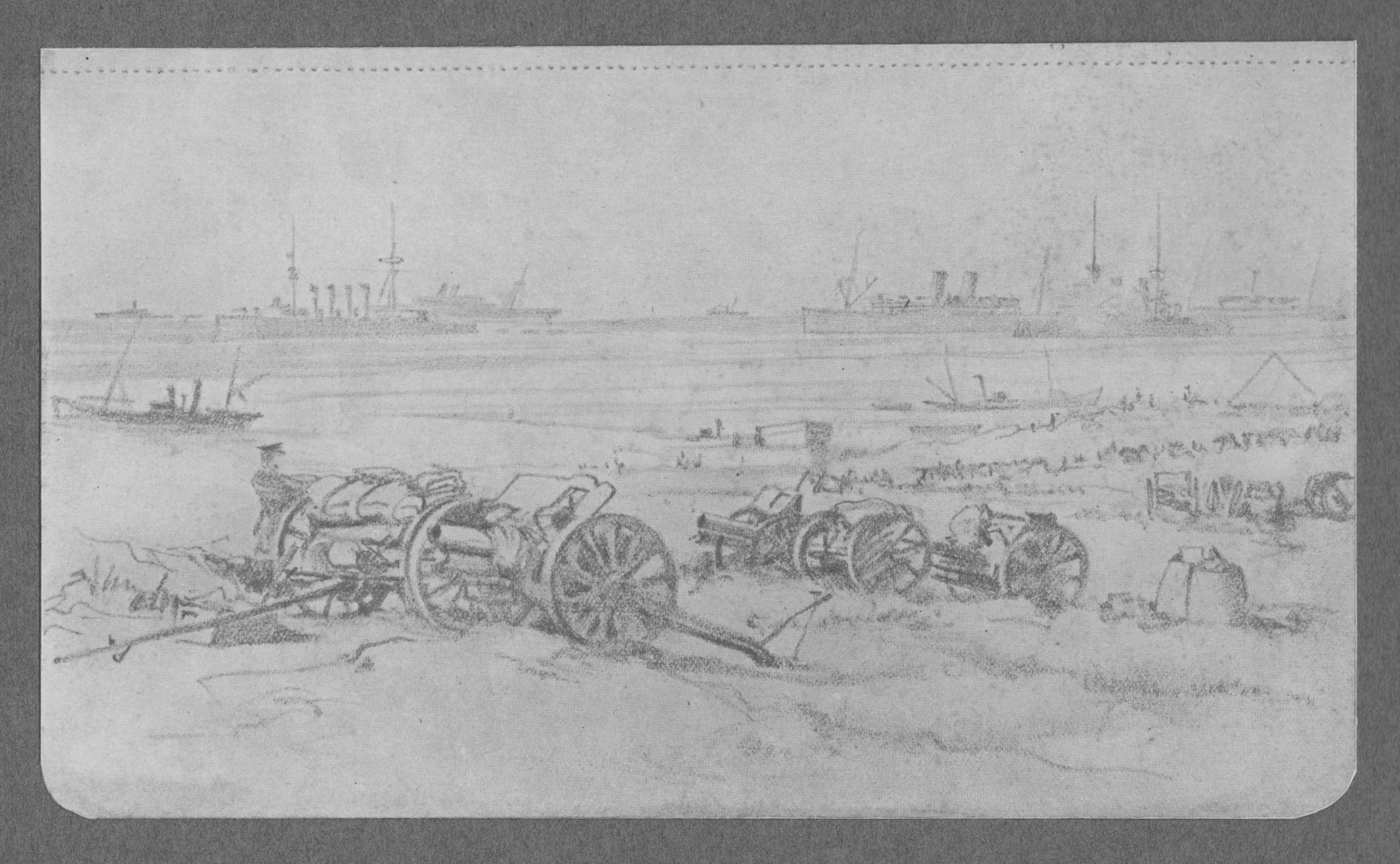
This pencil drawing by W.B.Hislop of battleships firing to cover the Gallipoli landings was made on about 26 April 1915. This drawing was found in a sketchbook in his pocket when his body was found some time later in an advanced position.

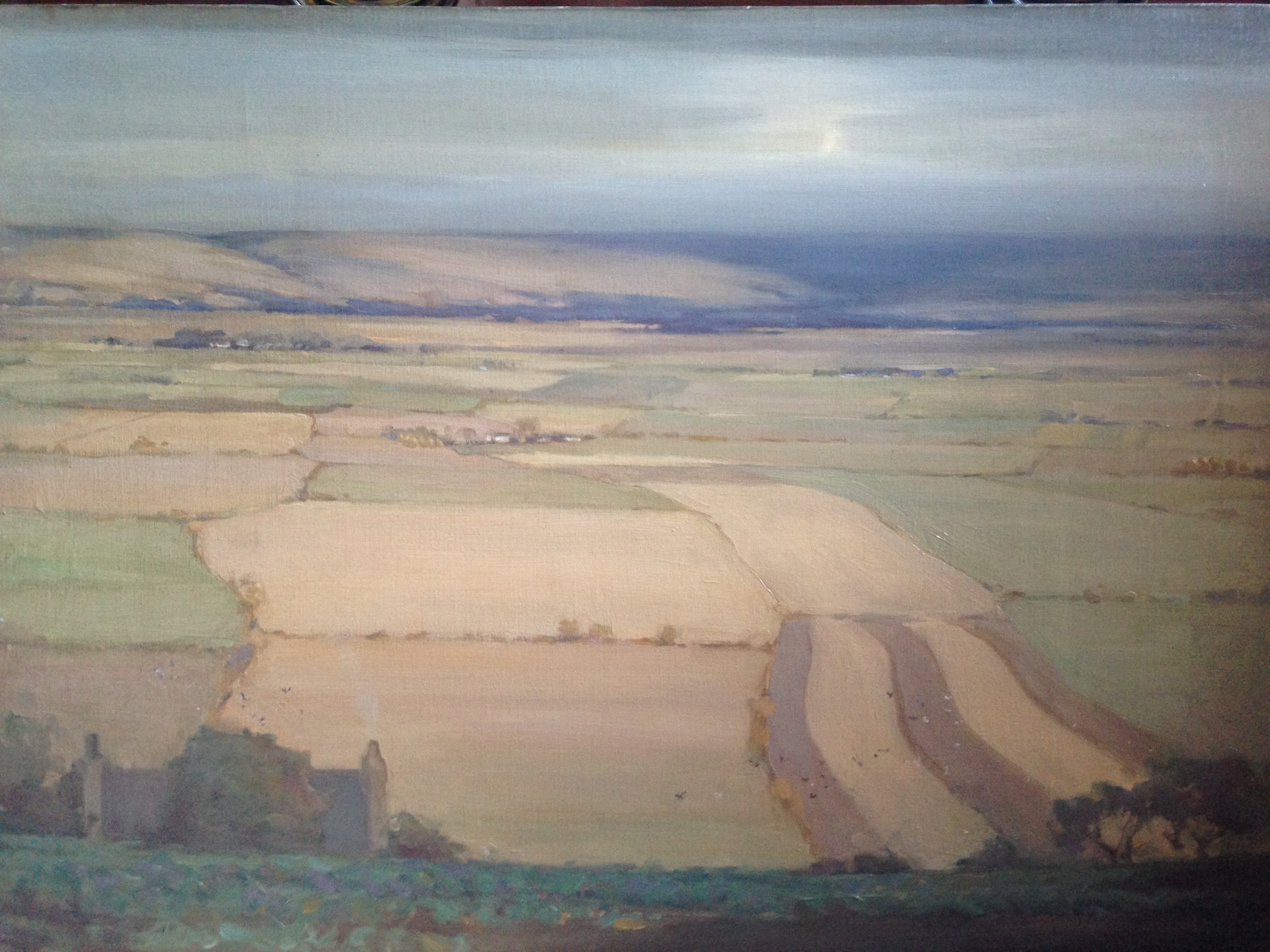
Oil painting by WB Hislop of an East Lothian landscape painted ca. 1910.

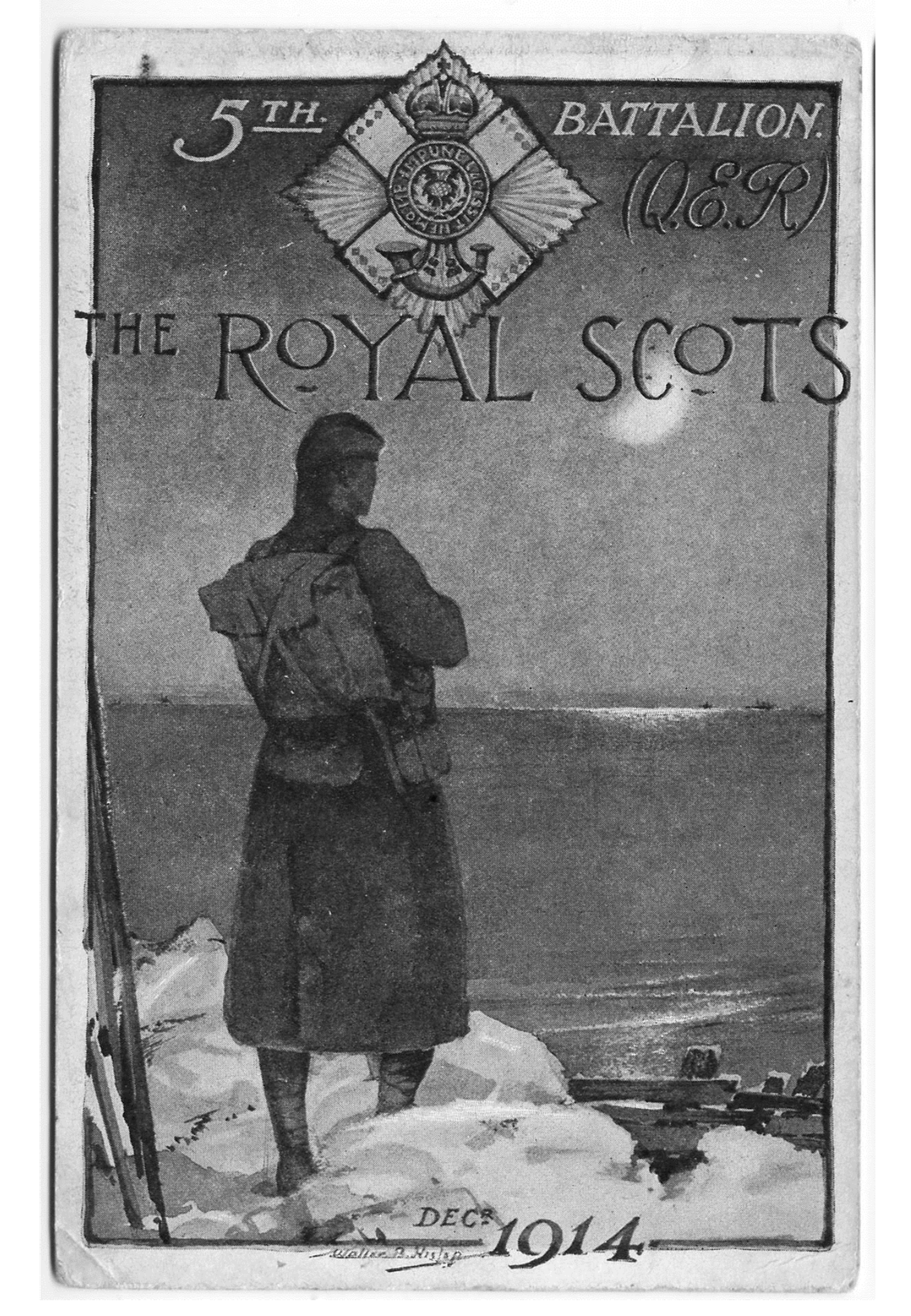
Christmas card drawn by WB Hislop (December 1914)

Walter Balmer Hislop (26 November 1886 – 28 April 1915) was a portrait painter and landscape artist.

Hislop trained at the Edinburgh College of Art. His parents were Margaret Robertson Hislop and John Hislop (ex-bailie of Leith), and they lived in a house named 'Summerside' on Pentland Avenue in Colinton, Edinburgh. He attended Leith Academy and in 1901 was awarded a Dux medal. He graduated with a Diploma in Drawing and Painting in 1909 and served on the staff from 1911-12.

During World War I Hislop served with ‘D’ Company, 1/5th (Queen's Edinburgh Rifles) Battalion, Royal Scots, having been commissioned into the regiment as a Second lieutenant in March 1914. He was involved in the Gallipoli Campaign but died on 28 April 1915 (aged 28) and is buried in Redoubt Cemetery Helles, Gallipoli, Turkey. His name appears on the War Memorial in the grounds of Colinton Parish Church. His sister was Jessie Hislop who married the Edinburgh artist Adam Bruce Thomson in 1918.

Hislop mainly painted portraits and landscapes particularly around Edinburgh and East Lothian. His work rarely appears on display or on sale, although two oil works on canvas were sold in 2017, and two in 2025.
