= Battle of Hill 60 =

Battle of Hill 60 is a name shared by two battles of World War I:

- Battle of Hill 60 (Western Front) (April 17–April 22, 1915), a subsidiary battle to the Battle of Neuve Chapelle
- Battle of Hill 60 (Gallipoli) (August 21–August 29, 1915), the last major assault of the Battle of Gallipoli

== See also ==
- Hill 60 (disambiguation)
