= Richard Reynell (RAF officer) =

Australian test pilot and fighter pilot

Richard Carew Reynell (12 April 1912 – 7 September 1940) was a test pilot and fighter pilot in the Second World War.

He was born into the prominent Reynell family of winemakers from Reynella, South Australia. His father, Carew Reynell, who was a leading winemaker died at Gallipoli in 1915 while commanding the 9th Light Horse. Reynell was educated at St Peter's College in Adelaide, and left Australia in 1929 to read agriculture at Balliol College, Oxford University. In 1931 he joined the Royal Air Force, serving in No. 43 Squadron and became an instructor at No. 8 Flying Training School, Montrose. Before the start Second World War he took a job as a test pilot with Hawker Aircraft.

While in England, Reynell met Marjorie Watts-Allan. They married and had a son, John, who died in a helicopter accident in 1973.

In August 1940, Reynell rejoined No. 43 Squadron to assess the Hawker Hurricane in combat conditions. In two weeks of combat he shot down one aircraft and scored several probables. On 7 September, Reynell was called back to Hawker to replace a pilot who had been killed. He elected to complete the day's flying operations. This was the day of the Luftwaffe's first large scale raids against London and his squadron of 12 aircraft attacked 100 German planes. Reynell's plane was shot down near Blackheath and broke apart. Reynell bailed out but his parachute did not open. Reynell survived bailing out with serious injuries but died at the scene. In 2013, a stone in memory of Reynell was unveiled in Point View park, Greenwich, close to the site. He is buried at Brookwood Cemetery in Surrey.
