= Carew Reynell (winemaker) =

Australian winemaker and soldier

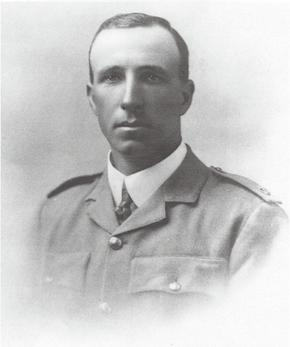
- Born: 16 September 1883; Magill, Adelaide, Australia
- Died: 28 August 1915 (aged 31); Gallipoli, Ottoman Empire
- Military career
- Allegiance: Australia
- Branch: Australian Army
- Service years: 1908–1915
- Rank: Lieutenant Colonel
- Units: 16th Light Horse Regiment; 22nd Light Horse Regiment; Australian Imperial Force; 9th Light Horse Regiment
- Conflicts: Battle of Hill 60 †

Carew Reynell (16 September 1883 – 28 August 1915) was an Australian winemaker and army commander. Born into the pioneering wine-making Reynell family of Reynella, South Australia, he was killed in action during the Battle of Hill 60.

== Early life ==
Reynell was born on 16 September 1883 in Magill, Adelaide, the fourth child and first son of Walter Reynell and his wife Emily (née Bakewell). His grandfather John Reynell had established wine-making in the region shortly after the settlement of South Australia. He was raised in Reynella and attended St Peter's College. At age 19, he took over his family's winery from his father, substantially improving it and increasing its size. Having become interested in brandy production since 1906, his distillery's Reynella Hospital Brandy soon became the premier hospital brandy in Australia. By 1914, his vineyard had around 500 ares (540,000 sq ft) of vine. He also reared Shropshire sheep and horses.

== Military career and death ==
Reynell attempted to enlist in the Australian army to fight in the Second Boer War but was prevented from doing so by his father. Nonetheless, in July 1908, he became a member of the pre-war militia as a second lieutenant in the 16th Light Horse Regiment (South Australian Mounted Rifles), reaching the rank of major in the 22nd Light Horse Regiment in November 1912. Shortly after the outbreak of the First World War, Reynell volunteered to serve in the Australian Imperial Force. He rose rapidly through the ranks and was appointed as a major in the 9th Light Horse Regiment. During the Gallipoli Campaign, he took command of the regiment after its commanding officer was killed at the Battle of the Nek. Promoted to lieutenant colonel, he was killed shortly after on 28 August at the Battle of Hill 60, aged 31. He was buried in the Hill 60 British Cemetery and posthumously mentioned in dispatches on 5 November 1915.

== Personal life ==
A Roman Catholic, Reynell was a member of the Adelaide Hunt Club and enjoyed polo in his spare time. On 11 May 1910, he married May Marian Byard (died 1967), the eldest daughter of Hahndorf College headmaster D. J. Byard. They had two children: a daughter, Lydia, and a son, Richard, who became a fighter and test pilot, and died in combat during the Battle of Britain almost 25 years to the day after his father was killed at Gallipoli.
