= D. J. Byard =

Headmaster of Hahndorf College, South Australia, Australia

Douglas John Byard (9 February 1859 – March 1949) was proprietor and headmaster of Hahndorf College, South Australia.

== History ==
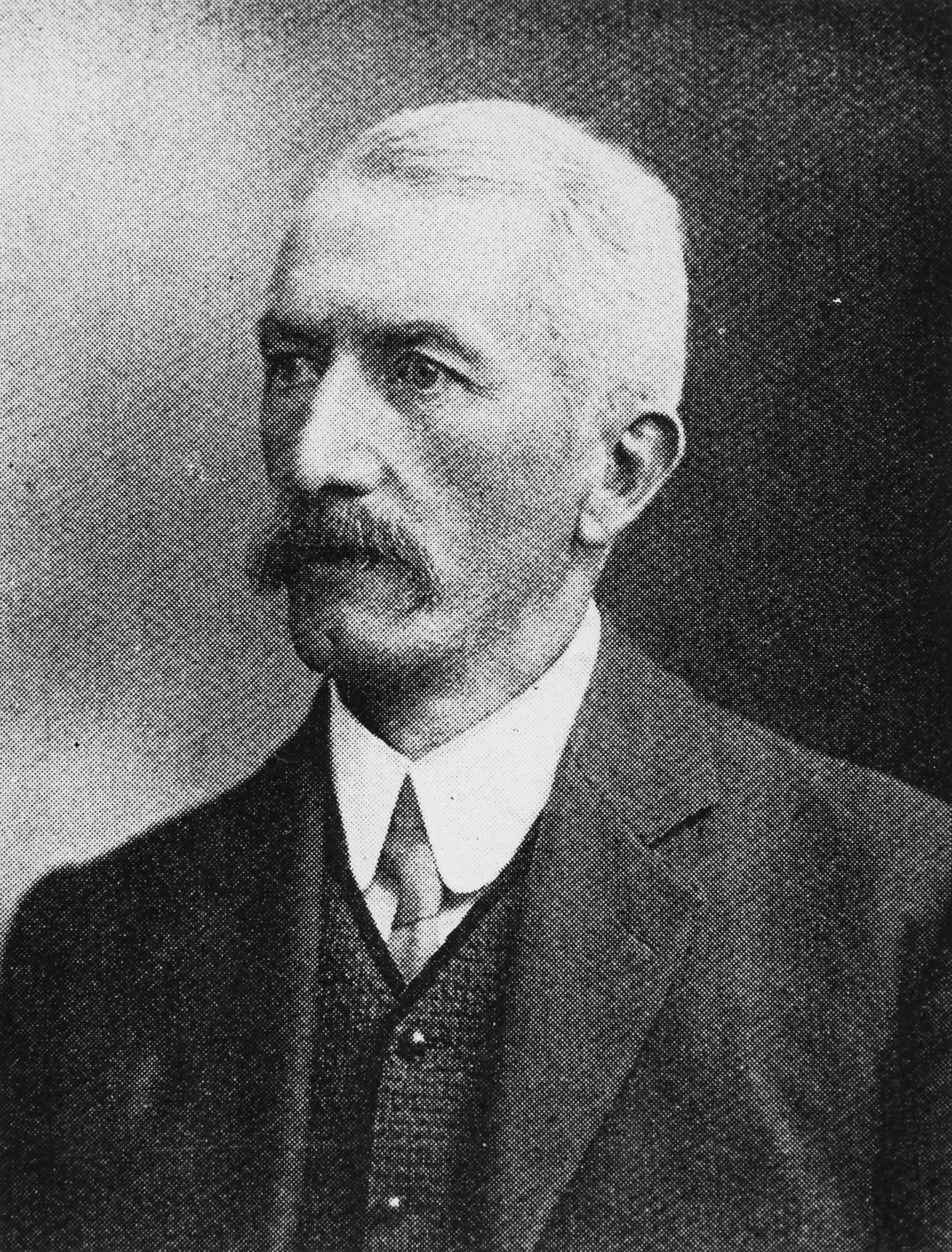
D. J. Byard, headmaster of Hahndorf College

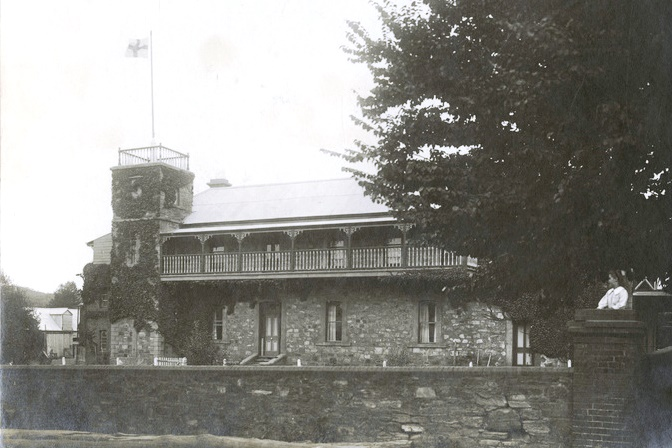
Hahndorf College building c. 1886

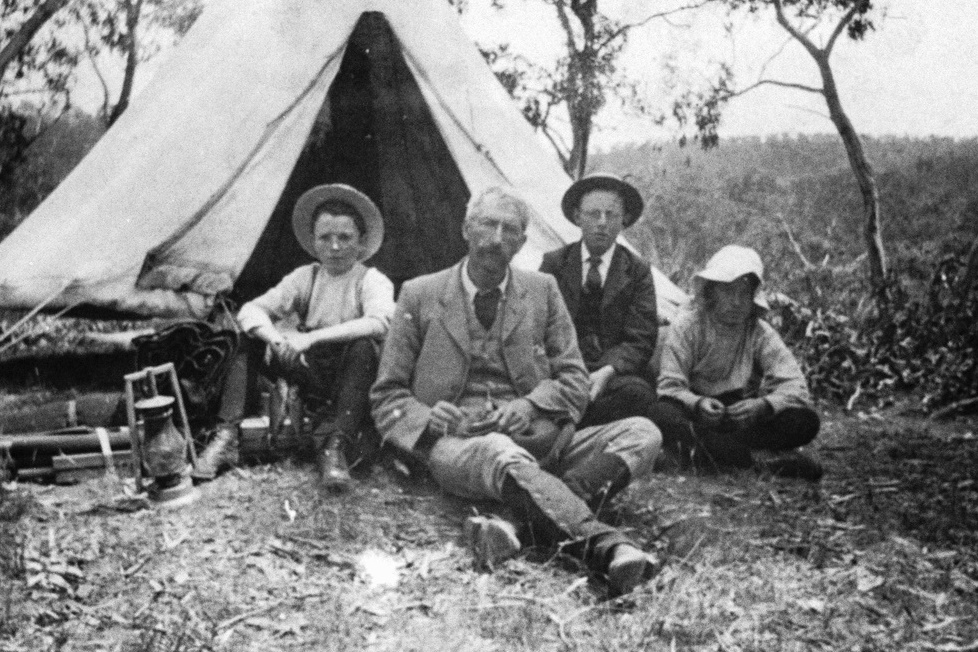
Byard and three Boy Scouts

Byard was born in Madras, India and educated at Clifton College, Bristol, then Exeter College, was awarded BA degree by Oxford University, admitted to a similar degree ad eundem at Adelaide University in 1888.

Byard arrived in South Australia sometime before 1885, when he started teaching at Whinham College, and took evening classes in Senior Latin at the University of Adelaide. The following year, he and Herbert S. Steer ran evening classes at Whinham College and was elected president of the Collegiate Schools Association. In July 1886 he reopened Hahndorf College (it had closed due to the illness of its headmaster and proprietor T. W. Boehm), with himself and Steer as joint principals. He also served as honorary lay reader at St Paul's College, Hahndorf. Byard and Steer had borrowed £1,200 to purchase the college building, and prospects appeared rosy when a typhoid epidemic struck the school and many potential students stayed away.

Steer's wife was among those infected, and was sent to a private hospital in North Adelaide. Steer was then in severe financial difficulties, and Byard took over the business of the school and its liabilities. Steer then found employment in Mount Gambier, and had just opened a private school in the town when his wife contracted diphtheria, again leading to loss of enrolments and additional expenses, and Steer was forced to declare himself insolvent.

Byard started an affiliated Hahndorf College Boy Scout troop sometime in or before 1909, in which year the first Christmas camp (jamboree) was held at Milang.

Byard closed the school at the end of 1912, citing ill-health. In later years Byard lived in Reynella. His wife died in 1932 and in April 1935 Byard left on the Orama for England, never to return, living in "North Lodge" or Winstowe Lodge, Charles road, St Leonards-on-Sea, Sussex (previously the home of H. Rider Haggard), where he had the services of a nurse.

== Publications ==
- Essential Spelling (1914)

== Other interests ==
- Byard was captain of the Hahndorf Cricket Club 1888–1894; hon. secretary 1899
- He was a Freemason, a member of the Prince of Wales Lodge, Mount Barker.
- He served as trustee of the Hahndorf Institute 1893–
- He was a vice-president of the Literary and Debating Society, founded in 1910.
- He was an enthusiastic member of both the choir of St Michael's (Lutheran) church and the Liedertafel.

== Family ==
Byard (8 February 1859 – March 1949 at St Leonards, Sussex) married Matilda Eunice Rogers (8 April 1859 – 19 May 1932) c. November 1881 in Woolwich, Kent. Their children include:

- May Marian Byard (c. 1881 – 1967) married Carew Reynell (16 September 1883 – 27 August 1915) on 18 May 1910. He was master of the hounds and polo player. Served with 9th Light Horse Regiment as Major and Lieut. Colonel, killed at Gallipoli. Their son and only child, Dick Reynell, was killed 25 years later in the Battle of Britain. He too left a widow and a child.
- Alfred John Byard (c. November 1883 – 1 May 1916) married Phoebe Elizabeth Gemmell (c. 1883 – 10 July 1955) on 20 May 1908. They had three children.
- Douglas Austin Byard (19 June 1887 – 30 April~3 May 1915) enlisted in 1914, served as private with 16th Battalion of 1st AIF, killed at Gallipoli.
- Amy Mathilde Byard (26 April 1889 – 1981) married Reginald Lancaster Beddome ( – 24 June 1940) on 5 January 1910, lived at "Rockford", Mylor
- Frank Liddell Byard (4 March 1891 – 25 June 1954) served in France and Belgium during WWI, noted as a diarist, later a winemaker and distiller of Reynella.
- Lancelot Walker Byard (12 December 1895 – 3 October 1947) was a vigneron at Reynella.

He married again, to Isobel Anderson (26 June 1861 – 31 January 1941) daughter of General Standen.
