= Walker's Ridge Commonwealth War Graves Commission Cemetery =

WWI CWGC cemetery in Gallipoli, Turkey

Walker's Ridge
- Commonwealth War Graves Commission
- Used for those deceased Aug–Dec 1915
- Established: 1915
- Location: 40°14′30″N 26°17′17″E
- Total burials: 92
- Unknowns: 12

Burials by nation
- Allied Powers: New Zealand: 48; Australia: 30; United Kingdom: 1

Burials by war
- World War I: 92

Walker's Ridge Cemetery is a small Commonwealth War Graves Commission cemetery located near Suvla Bay in Turkey. It contains the remains of Allied soldiers killed during the Battle of Gallipoli.

It was constructed on a spur which was named by the occupying troops after the headquarters of the New Zealand Infantry Brigade, under the command of Brigadier-General Harold Walker, which was located there. The cemetery was formed during the occupation in 1915 and is divided into two plots 20 metres apart and originally separated by a trench.

== Notable graves ==
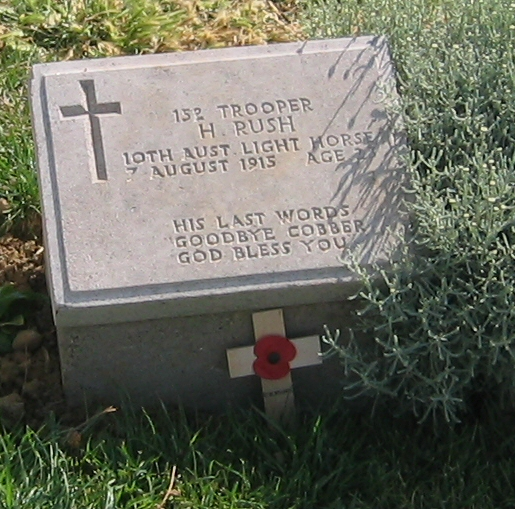
Harold Rush's grave marker in Walker's Ridge Cemetery

Amongst the graves is that of 23-year-old Trooper Harold Rush of the 10th Australian Light Horse regiment. Rush was in the third wave of troops to charge Turkish trenches at the battle of the Nek on 7 August 1915. Seeing that previous two waves had been slaughtered, just before his wave attacked he turned to a fellow soldier and said "Goodbye Cobber, God bless you". His parents had these last words recorded on his grave marker.
