= Johnston's Jolly Commonwealth War Graves Commission Cemetery =

WWI CWGC cemetery in Gallipoli, Turkey

Coordinates: 40°13′57″N 26°17′15″E

Johnston's Jolly
- Commonwealth War Graves Commission
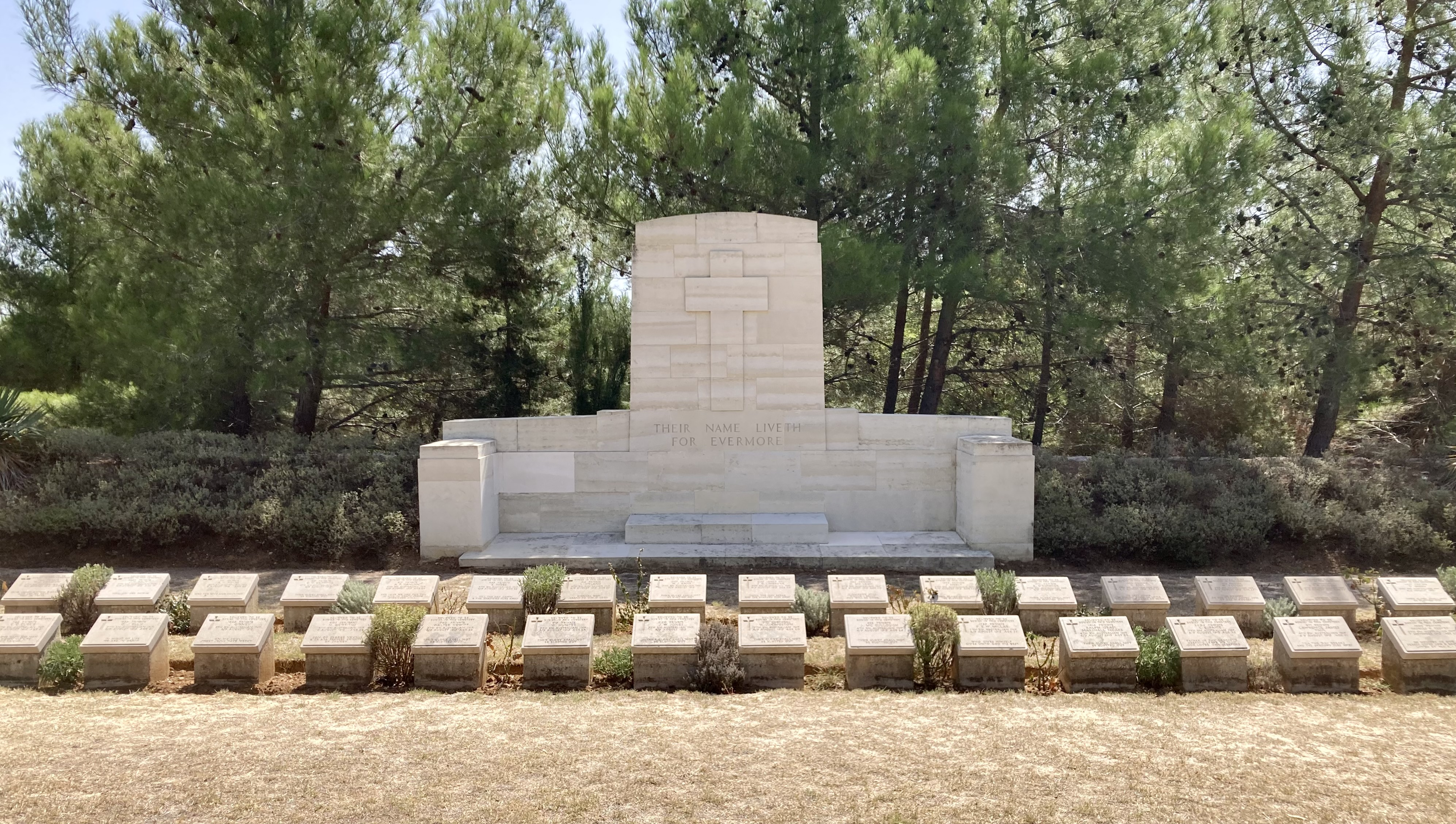
- Used for those deceased April–December 1915
- Established: 1915
- Location: near Gallipoli, Turkey
- Total burials: 181
- Unknowns: 180

Burials by nation
- Allied Powers: Australian: 3; New Zealand: 1

Burials by war
- World War I: 181

Johnston's Jolly Cemetery is a Commonwealth War Graves Commission cemetery containing the remains of some of the Allied troops who died during the Battle of Gallipoli.

The battles at Gallipoli were an eight-month campaign fought by British Empire and French forces against the Ottoman Empire in an attempt to force Turkey out of the war and to open a supply route to Russia through the Dardanelles and the Black Sea.

Johnston's Jolly was the north end of Plateau 400 in the ANZAC sector which was captured by the 2nd Australian Infantry Brigade on 25 April 1915, the day of the landing, but recaptured by Turkish forces the following day and remained under Turkish control for the rest of the campaign.

The Turkish name for the position was Kirmezi Sirt, Red Ridge, whilst the ANZAC troops called it Johnston's Jolly because it was opposite Colonel George Johnston's field artillery position which would be used to "jolly up" the defending Turks.

The cemetery was constructed after the Armistice and populated with remains found on the surrounding battlefield. There is only one identified individual, although the nationalities of a few other graves are known and special memorials record the names of 36 Australian soldiers known to be buried in the cemetery.
