= Skew Bridge Commonwealth War Graves Commission Cemetery =

British war graves cemetery in Helles, Gallipoli, Çanakkale, Turkey

Skew Bridge
- Commonwealth War Graves Commission
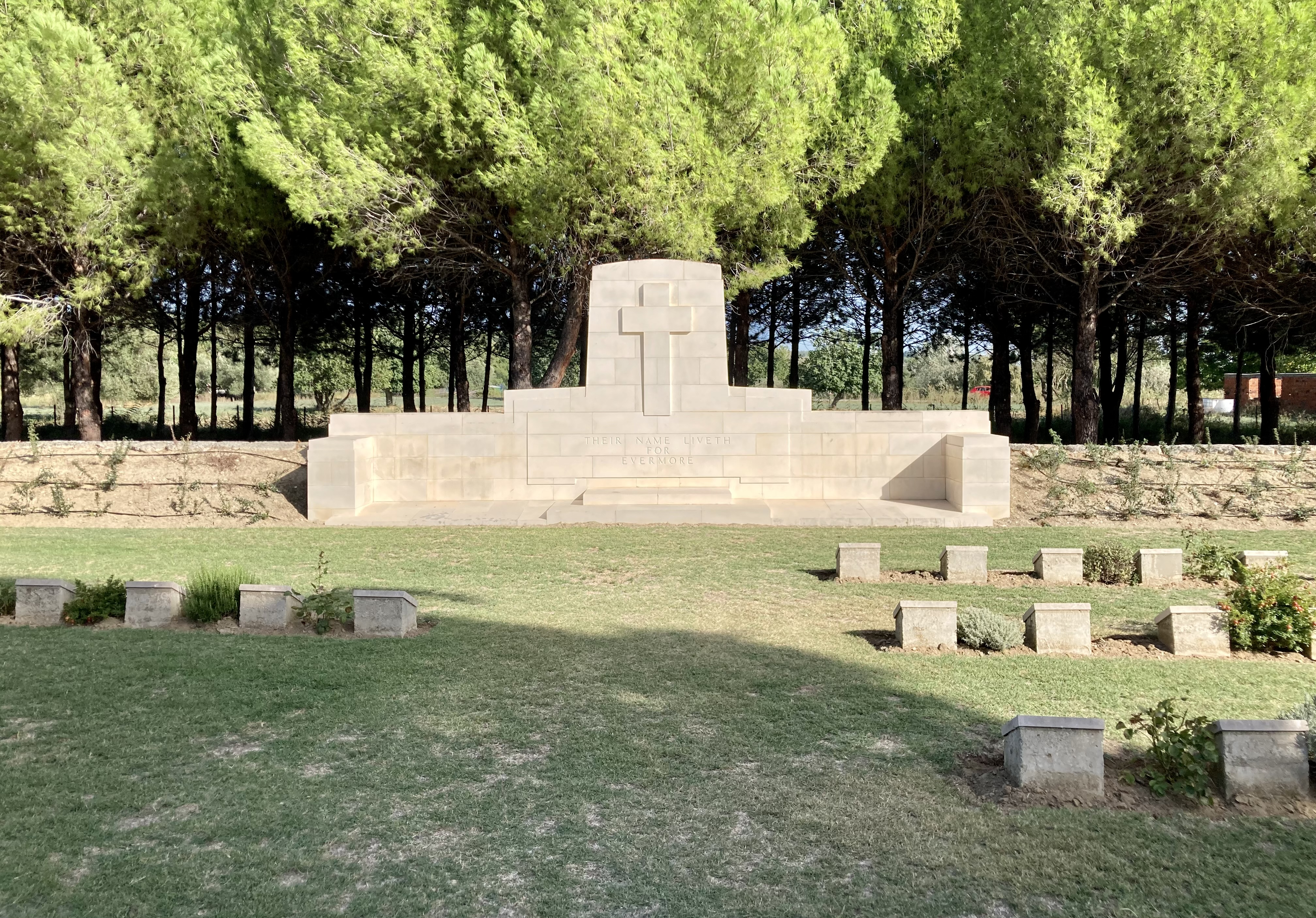
- Used for those deceased April–December 1915
- Established: 1915
- Location: 40°03′15″N 26°12′01″E near Gallipoli, Turkey
- Total burials: 607
- Unknowns: 351

Burials by nation
- Allied Powers: British: 249; Australian: 9; Newfoundland: 8; New Zealand: 2; India: 1

Burials by war
- World War I: 607

Skew Bridge Cemetery is a Commonwealth War Graves Commission cemetery containing the remains of Allied troops who died during the Battle of Gallipoli, including the youngest British soldier.

== History ==
The battles at Gallipoli were an eight-month campaign fought by British Empire and French forces against the Ottoman Empire in an attempt to force Turkey out of the war and to open a supply route to Russia through the Dardanelles and the Black Sea.

The cemetery is 2 kilometres northeast of Seddülbahir on the Gallipoli Peninsula. Is named after a skewed wooden bridge which carried the road from Helles to Krithia across the Dere, a stream about 45 metres west of the cemetery and just behind the centre of the Allied lines. The cemetery was created during the fighting of 6–8 May 1915 and used until the Allied evacuation in January 1916. It originally contained only 53 graves, but now contains 607 graves, a consequence of its enlargement following the Armistice as graves were moved in from the surrounding including clearing Backhouse Post, Orchard Gully, R.N.D., and Romanos Well cemeteries. Special memorials record 125 British and 4 Australians who are known to be buried in the cemetery but the location of whose graves is not known more precisely.

== Notable graves ==
Amongst those known to be buried in the cemetery is the youngest British soldier to be killed during the campaign and the youngest Allied serviceman to be buried on the peninsula. Drummer Joseph Aloysius Townsend of D Company, 1/4th Battalion of the East Lancashire Regiment was 15 when he was killed on 18 May 1915.

(The youngest Allied soldier to die on service was an Australian, Private James Martin, aged 14 years 9 months. He contracted typhoid and was evacuated to a hospital ship where he died and was buried at sea.)
