= The Nek Commonwealth War Graves Commission Cemetery =

WWI CWGC cemetery in Gallipoli, Turkey

The Nek Cemetery
- Commonwealth War Graves Commission
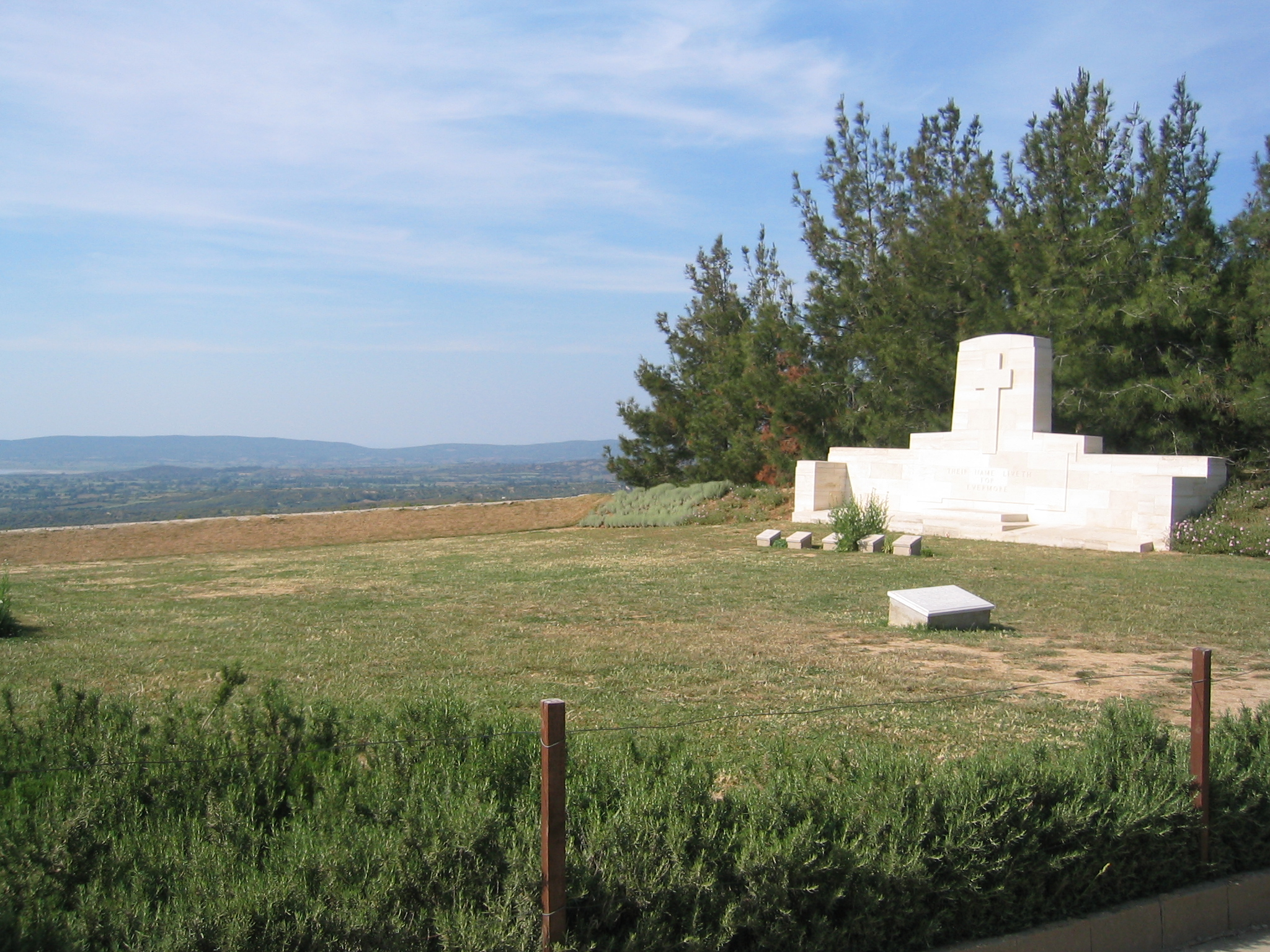
- Used for those deceased August–December 1915
- Established: 1919
- Location: 40°14′33″N 26°17′24″E
- Total burials: 326

Burials by nation
- Allied Powers: Unknown: 316; Australia: 6; New Zealand: 4

Burials by war
- World War I: 326

The Nek Cemetery is a small Commonwealth War Graves Commission cemetery near Suvla Bay on the Gallipoli Peninsula in Turkey.

The cemetery was constructed following the Armistice in 1919 on the site of the Battle of the Nek, at which time the ground was still covered with the remains of Australian 8th and 10th Light Horse troopers killed in the battle four years previously. They likely form the majority of the unknown graves in the cemetery. The cemetery has the graves of only five identified soldiers and special memorials to another five known to be buried there.
