= Canterbury Commonwealth War Graves Commission Cemetery =

WWI burial ground in Gallipoli, Turkey

Coordinates: 40°14′40″N 26°16′59″E

Canterbury
- Commonwealth War Graves Commission
- Used for those deceased Aug – Dec 1915
- Established: 1919
- Location: near Gallipoli, Turkey
- Total burials: 27
- Unknowns: 5

Burials by nation
- Allied Powers: New Zealand: 27

Burials by war
- World War I: 27

Canterbury Cemetery is a small Commonwealth War Graves Commission cemetery located at ANZAC Cove in Turkey. It contains the remains of 27 soldiers from the New Zealand Expeditionary Force. 26 were from the Canterbury Mounted Rifles and one from the Wellington Regiment. It is the only CWGC cemetery on the Gallipoli peninsula which has no epitaphs on any of the grave markers.
