= Carew Reynell (writer) =

English economic writer

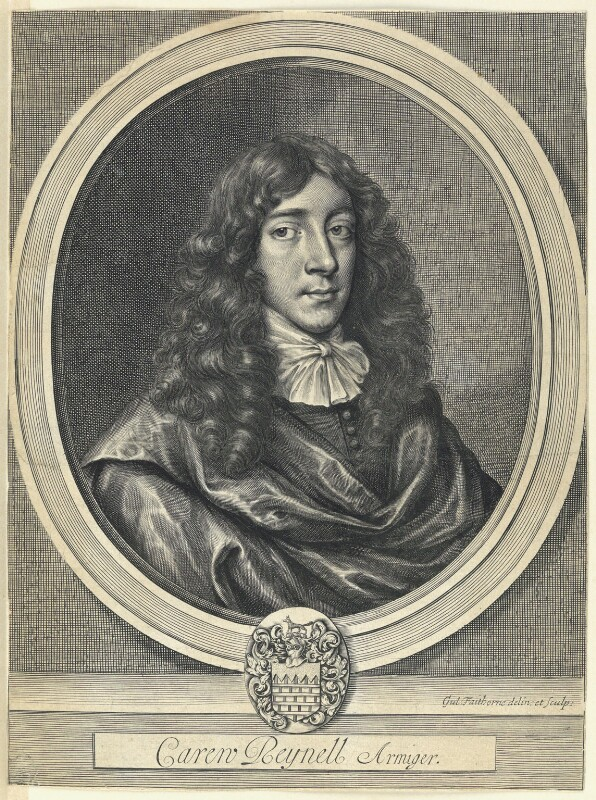
- Born: 1636
- Died: 1690 (aged 53–54); Shoreditch
- Occupation: Economic writer

Carew Reynell (1636–1690) was an English economic writer.

== Biography ==
Reynell born in 1636, and descended of the family of Reynell of East Ogwell, Devonshire, was grandson of Sir George Reynell, marshal of the king's bench, and son of Carew Reynell (died 1657), also marshal of the king's bench, who resided at Rivershill in the parish of Binstead, Hampshire. His mother was Mary, daughter of Marcellus Rivers of St. Saviour's, Southwark, and Rivershill. His only brother, George, was fellow of Corpus Christi College, Oxford, and canon of Lincoln from 1682 till his death in 1687, when he was buried in the chapel of his college.

Carew entered at Wadham College, Oxford, on 16 July 1652 as a gentleman commoner. He left Oxford without a degree, and in 1654 was entered a student of the Middle Temple (Gardiner, Wadham College, p. 198). In 1655 he was sent to Exeter jail on a charge of complicity in the rising against the government at Salisbury of John Penruddock (see State Papers, Dom. Interreg. cxxviii. 8). His father petitioned the council to pardon him on account of his youth, and General Desborough was ordered, after taking security from the elder Reynell for his good conduct, to send him home. It is probable that he then went abroad. In 1657 he succeeded to his patrimony of Rivershill, and in 1661 greeted the Restoration with an extravagant ode, ‘The Fortunate Change, being a Panegyrick to his sacred Majesty King Charles II,’ London, 1661, fol. It was reprinted in ‘Fugitive Poetical Tracts’ (2nd ser. No. xxiv). Thenceforth Reynell devoted himself to economic studies. He died, at his house in Shoreditch, in 1690.

He married, first, Anna, widow of one Metcalfe; his second wife was named Elizabeth, widow of Ralph Took of Took's Court (cf. Chester, Marriage Licences, ed. Foster, col. 1125). By the first wife he had a son, Carew, and by the second wife a daughter, Anne.

Reynell's economic study resulted in ‘The True English Interest, or an Account of the Chief Natural Improvements and some Political Observations demonstrating an Infallible Advance of this Nation to infinite Wealth and Greatness, Trade and Populacy, with Employment and Preferment for all Persons,’ London, 1674, 8vo (licensed 5 Sept. 1673). It is a noticeable book, though it accepts the mercantile theory without question. It was noticed in ‘Philosophical Transactions,’ No. 102, 27 April 1674, vol. ix. In the twenty-seventh chapter (p. 79), ‘of learning’ (and libraries), Reynell says: ‘Much more would be said of this subject, but I refer that to my “Discourse of the Advancement of Learning,”’ of which nothing is known.
