= New Zealand No.2 Outpost Commonwealth War Graves Commission Cemetery =

WWI CWGC cemetery in Gallipoli, Turkey

Coordinates: 40°15′11″N 26°16′51″E

New Zealand No. 2 Outpost Cemetery
- Commonwealth War Graves Commission
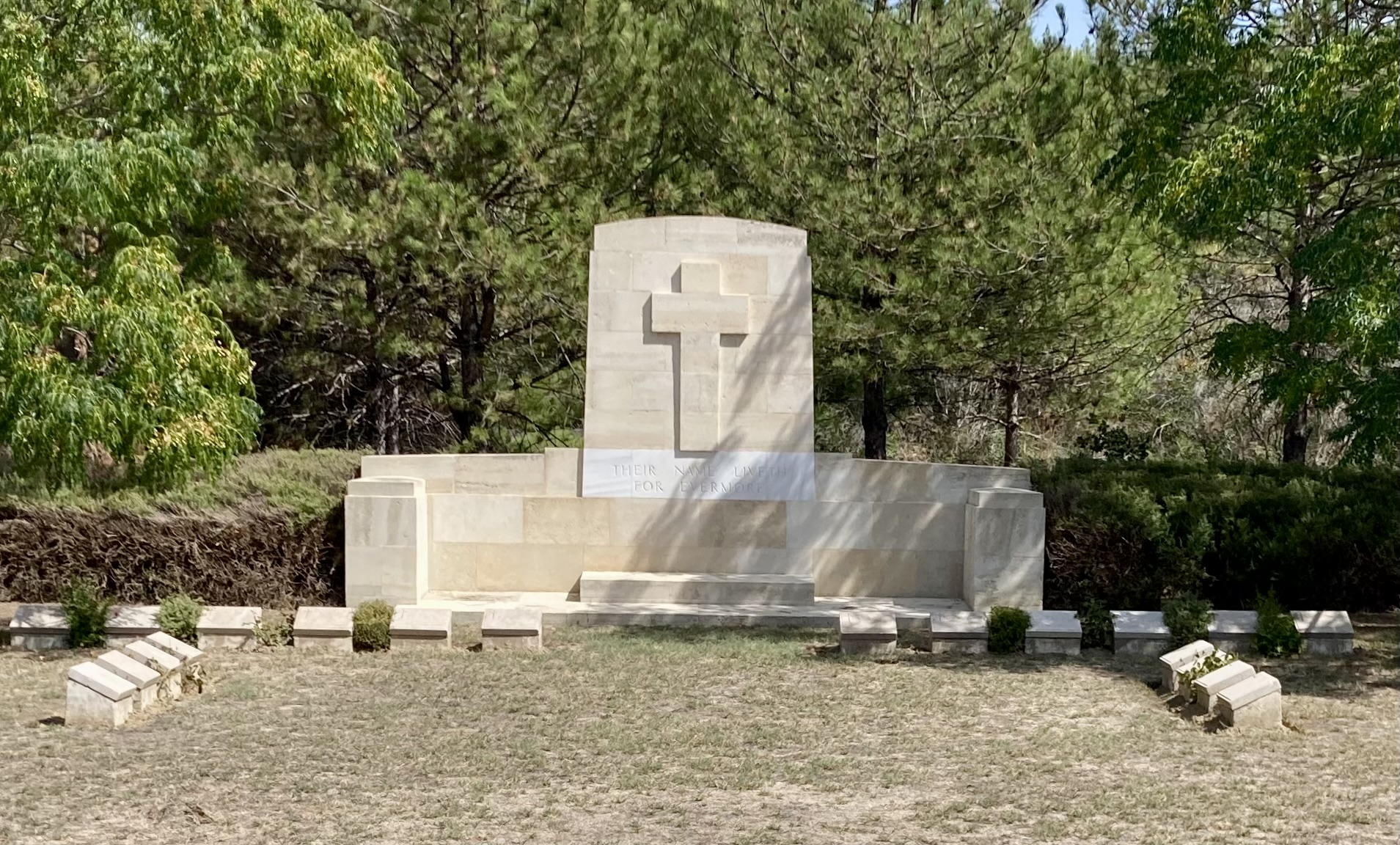
- Used for those deceased April–December 1915
- Established: 1915
- Location: near Gallipoli, Turkey
- Total burials: 183
- Unknowns: 150

Burials by nation
- Allied Powers: Australian: 8; New Zealand: 13

Burials by war
- World War I: 183

New Zealand No. 2 Outpost Cemetery is a small Commonwealth War Graves Commission cemetery containing the remains of some of the Allied troops who died during the Battle of Gallipoli.

The battles at Gallipoli were an eight-month campaign fought by British Empire and French forces against the Ottoman Empire in an attempt to force Turkey out of the war and to open a supply route to Russia through the Dardanelles and the Black Sea.

The NZEF Canterbury Infantry Battalion created No. 1 and 2 Outposts on 30 April 1915. The 16th Casualty Clearing Station and the New Zealand Dental Corps clinic were established near No. 2 Outpost, which had a well. Heavy fighting took place there at the end of May and it was later one of the jumping off points for the battle of Sari Bair. The cemetery is one long grave containing burials. Special memorials commemorate 31 casualties thought to be buried among them. Outpost No. 2 Cemetery is within 100 metres of it.
