= Hill 60 Commonwealth War Graves Commission Cemetery =

CWGC cemetery in Gallipoli, Turkey

Coordinates: 40.2726°N 26.2931°E

Hill 60
- Commonwealth War Graves Commission
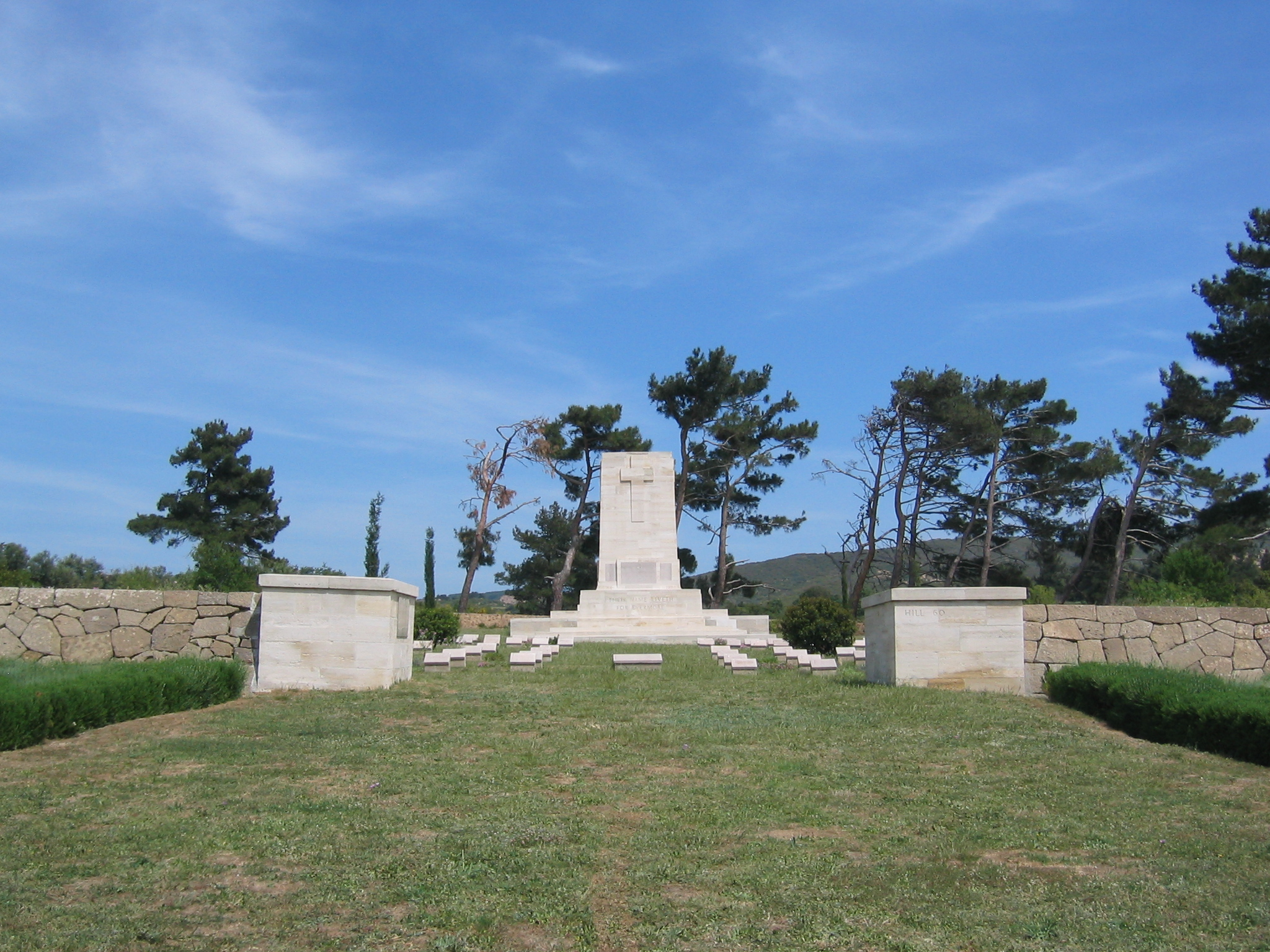
- Used for those deceased August–December 1915
- Established: 1915
- Location: near Gallipoli, Turkey
- Total burials: 754
- Unknowns: 712

Burials by nation
- Allied Powers: Australian: 25; British: 18; New Zealand: 12

Burials by war
- World War I: 754

Hill 60 Cemetery is a Commonwealth War Graves Commission cemetery dating from World War I at the Northern end of the former Anzac sector of the Gallipoli Peninsula, Turkey and the location of Hill 60 (New Zealand) Memorial, one of four memorials on the peninsula which commemorate New Zealanders killed in the campaign but who have no known grave.

The battles at Gallipoli, some of whose participating soldiers are buried at this cemetery, was an eight-month campaign fought by Commonwealth and French forces against Turkish forces in an attempt to force Turkey out of the war, to relieve the deadlock of the Western Front (France/Belgium) and to open a supply route to Russia through the Dardanelles and the Black Sea.

The main landings were in April 1915, but failure to make any progress led to a further landing at Suvla Bay to the North of the existing Allied positions on 6 August. However indecision and confusion led delays allowing the Turkish defenders to reinforce their positions, resulting in a stalemate.

Hill 60 was a low Turkish occupied knoll 60 metres above sea level at the northern end of the Sari Bair range which nevertheless dominated the Allied positions near Suvla bay. It was the location of the Battle of Hill 60, the last major assault of the campaign, launched on 21 August 1915 to coincide with the attack on Scimitar Hill made from the Suvla front by General Stopford's British IX Corps. The battle lasted for 8 days, and although Australian troops reached the top of the hill the vital north facing slopes which overlooked Suvla remained in Turkish hands.

The cemetery, on the site of some of the trenches fought over during the battle, was used following the battle and extensively enlarged after the Armistice from remains found on the surrounding battlefield and from 42 graves moved in from Norfolk Trench Cemetery. 712 of the graves are unidentified, but special memorials commemorate 34 casualties thought to be amongst them.

The cemetery also contains one of four memorials commemorating New Zealand troops who do not have known graves, the Hill 60 (New Zealand) Memorial, and contains the names of 183 New Zealand soldiers killed during the battle. The cemetery also contains the identified graves of 13 New Zealanders (one of whom was in the Australian Imperial Force), and a further 16 are thought to be buried in the cemetery.
