= Redoubt Commonwealth War Graves Commission Cemetery =

Cemetery in Turkey

Redoubt
- Commonwealth War Graves Commission
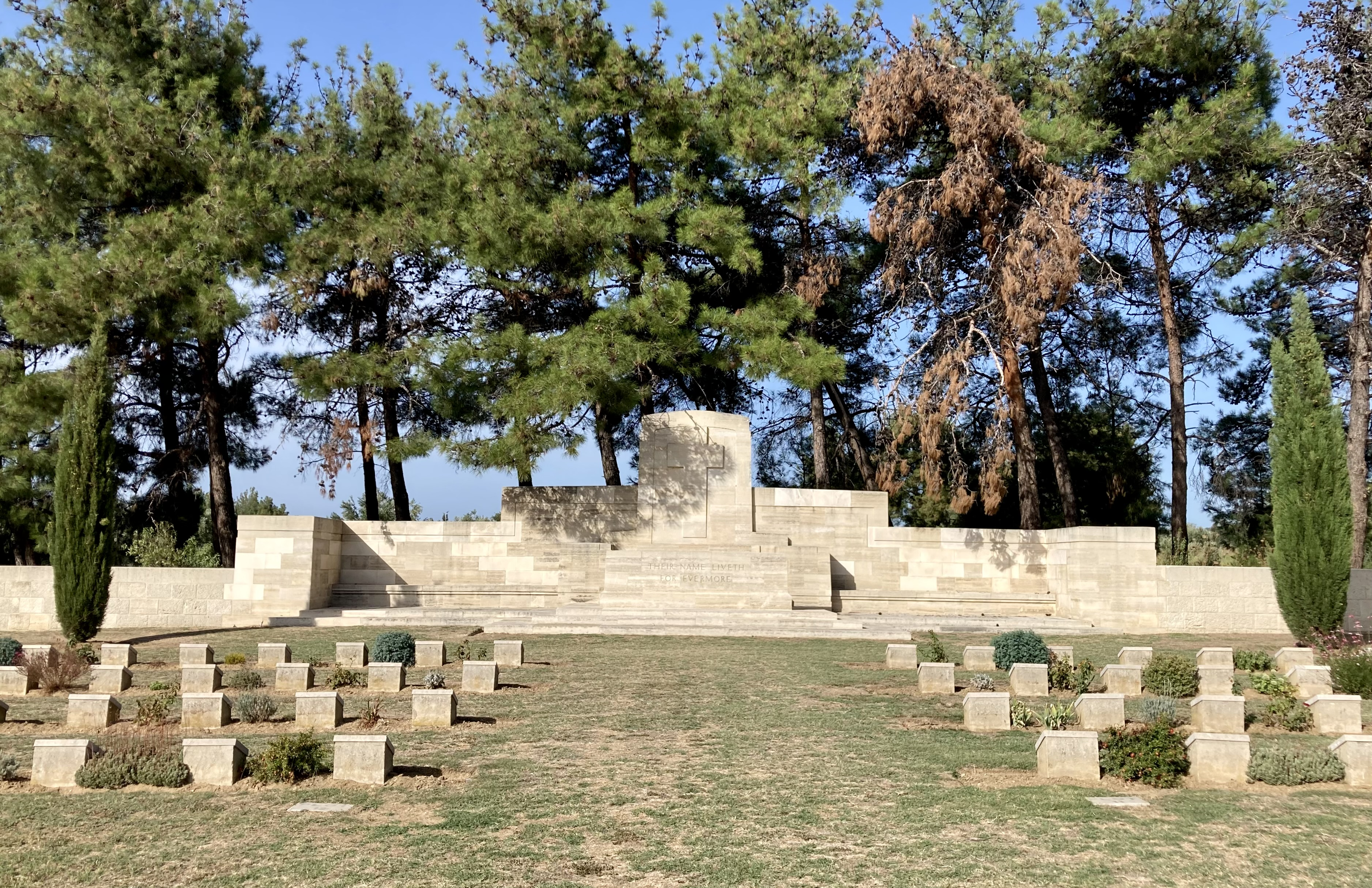
- Used for those deceased May 1915–January 1916
- Established: 1915
- Location: 40.078°N 26.214°E near Alcitepe, Turkey
- Total burials: 2,037

Burials by nation
- Allied Powers

Redoubt Cemetery is a Commonwealth War Graves Commission (CWGC) cemetery containing the remains of allied troops who died during the Battle of Gallipoli in Turkey. It is located near Krithia on the Gallipoli Peninsula.

The cemetery is named after the Redoubt Line, a chain of strongpoints built by the Ottoman forces across the southern end of the peninsula during the battles for Krithia. The cemetery was started by the 2nd Australian Infantry Brigade in May 1915 and continued to be used throughout the campaign until the evacuation in January 1916.

After the war many graves were moved into it from the surrounding area and it was consequently enlarged to its current 2,037 graves. The cemetery also contains an oak tree planted by the parents of Second Lieutenant Eric Duckworth in 1922; he had been killed on 7 August 1915 but his body was never found. This memorial is unique in the peninsula as the only private memorial located within a CWGC cemetery.
