= Battle of Hill 60 (Gallipoli) =

Battle in 1915 during the First World War

- Part of the Gallipoli campaign in the Middle Eastern Theatre of the First World War
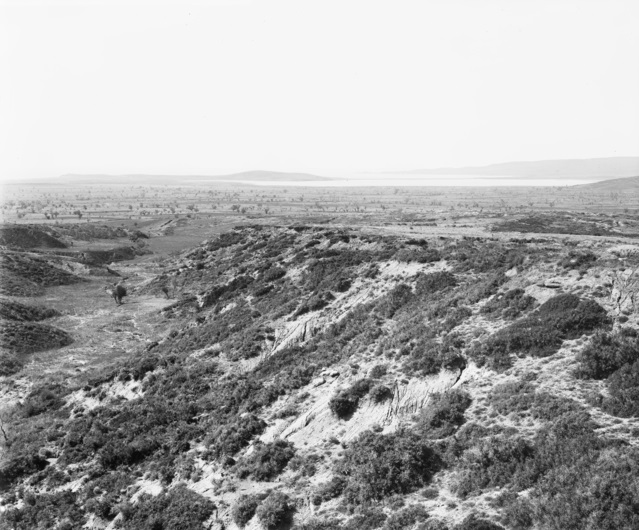
- Kaiajik Dere and Hill 60, 1919
Date	21–29 August 1915
Location	Gallipoli, Ottoman Empire 40°16′21″N 26°17′35″E
Result	Ottoman victory

Belligerents
United Kingdom and Empire: Australia; India; New Zealand	Ottoman Empire

Commanders and leaders
(British Empire) William Birdwood	(Ottoman Empire) Mustafa Kemal (Ottoman Empire) Cevat Pasha

Strength
4,000	Unknown

Casualties and losses
1,100	Unknown
- Location within Turkey

The Battle of Hill 60 was one of the last major assaults of the Gallipoli Campaign. It was launched on 21 August 1915 to coincide with the attack on Scimitar Hill made from the Suvla front by Major-General H. de B. De Lisle's British IX Corps, Frederick Stopford having been replaced in the few days previous. Hill 60 was a low knoll at the northern end of the Sari Bair range which dominated the Suvla landing. Capturing this hill along with Scimitar Hill would have allowed the Anzac and Suvla landings to be securely linked.

Two major attacks were made by Allied forces, the first on 21 August and the second on 27 August. The first assault resulted in limited gains around the lower parts of the hill, but the Ottoman defenders managed to hold the heights even after the attack was continued by a fresh Australian battalion on 22 August. Reinforcements were committed, but nevertheless the second major assault on 27 August fared similarly, and although fighting around the summit continued over the course of three days, at the end of the battle the Ottoman forces remained in possession of the summit.

== Background ==
Hill 60 (Kaiajik Aghala) commanded the low ground occupied by a thin line of outposts between the Allied forces at Anzac and Suvla. The hill was to be taken as part of an attack that stretched over a two-mile front from Hill 60 through Hetman Chair, Hill 70 and Oglu Tepe. The initial attacking force was based on troops allocated to Major-General Herbert Cox by Lieutenant-General William Birdwood:

Canterbury Mounted Rifles and the Otago Mounted Rifles of the New Zealand Mounted Rifles Brigade (400 men)
13th and 14th Battalions of the Australian 4th Infantry Brigade (500 men),
2 Gurkha battalions of the 29th Indian Brigade of the 10th Indian Division,
5th Battalion of the Irish Connaught Rangers (700 men), 10th Hampshires (330 men) and 4th South Wales Borderers of the British 29th Division.

Starting positions and projected advance for 21 August 1915

The initial plan allocated the primary objective of Hill 60 to the New Zealand Mounted Rifles (NZMR). To their left, the Connaught Rangers were to take the water wells at Kabak Kuyu and the Gurkhas the wells at Susak Kuyu. To the right of the NZMR, troops of the Australian 4th Infantry Brigade (4 Aust) supported by the 10th Hampshires were to launch a feint attack, on the spur just above the knoll itself, to draw off Turkish reserves.

== Battle ==
On the morning of 21 August, it was decided that the New Zealand artillery support, that had been planned to pre-empt the attack, would be diverted to support the Suvla offensive. The start time for the advance on Hill 60 was put back by 30 minutes, by which time it was expected that the artillery would be available to support it. As a consequence Hill 60, and the area around it, received practically no bombardment and the attackers were guaranteed to face severe opposition because the Turks were alerted.

Situation at nightfall, 21 August

The NZMR moved out at 3:30 with a 400-metre (1,300 ft) approach march to the Ottoman positions. A number of Turks, on seeing the advancing lines abandoned their front trench, ran back to their rear trenches and, by 3:45, the New Zealanders began occupying the forward position. At 4 pm, the NZMR were in their first objective but neither the Indian Brigade on their left nor 4 Aust on their right were up with them though the Connaught Rangers had secured their first objective, the wells at Kabak. Brigadier-General Andrew Hamilton Russell, the NZMR commander, ordered the Australians to push forward and requested that the Connaughts assist on the left flank. Although only 'A' Company was ordered forward, the Connaughts had become very mixed and the charge was made up from a crowd of men from all the companies, "mad with the lust for battle". Passing the first line trench on the west of the hill, with Turks running before them, the Connaughts were stopped by heavy rifle and machine gun fire from the crest as well as accurate artillery fire.

The survivors consolidated their position in the first-line trench, and were relieved by the Gurkhas from 5:15, leaving the Connaughts to concentrate on securing and fortifying the wells. The right flank was still having difficulties. From Hill 100 down to Hill 60, the Turkish trenches and artillery commanded the Kaiajik Dere valley which 4 Aust and the Hampshires had to cross. Those that survived the crossing had dug in at 5 pm. An artillery shell had set undergrowth on fire, burning many of the wounded to death. The Connaughts joined up with the NZMR to their right by 7 pm, but there was still a gap between the NZMR and the Australian 4th Infantry Brigade.

On 22 August, the attack was reinforced by the Australian 18th Battalion which was part of the newly arrived Australian 2nd Division. The men were fresh and healthy, in stark contrast to the veteran troops, but were inexperienced and ill-equipped. Attacking only with the bayonet, they suffered 383 casualties, out of 750 men, in their dawn attack on Hill 60.

Situation of Allied and Turkish forces at 29 August

The assault resumed on 27 August and further progress was made up the slope, but the summit of the hill was still held by the Ottomans. On the evening of 27 August 1915, the 9th Light Horse Regiment, of the Australian 3rd Light Horse Brigade, were sent in as reinforcements. One wave of 75 men led by the new commander, Lieutenant Colonel Carew Reynell, lost its way and was caught in the open by Ottoman machine guns, with many soldiers and Reynell being killed. The 10th Light Horse Regiment was committed to the fighting, and on 28 August, some trenches at the summit were captured but the Ottomans clung to the vital northern face which overlooked Suvla. Attacking and counter-attacking continued until this final assault on Hill 60 ended on 29 August 1915.

== Aftermath ==
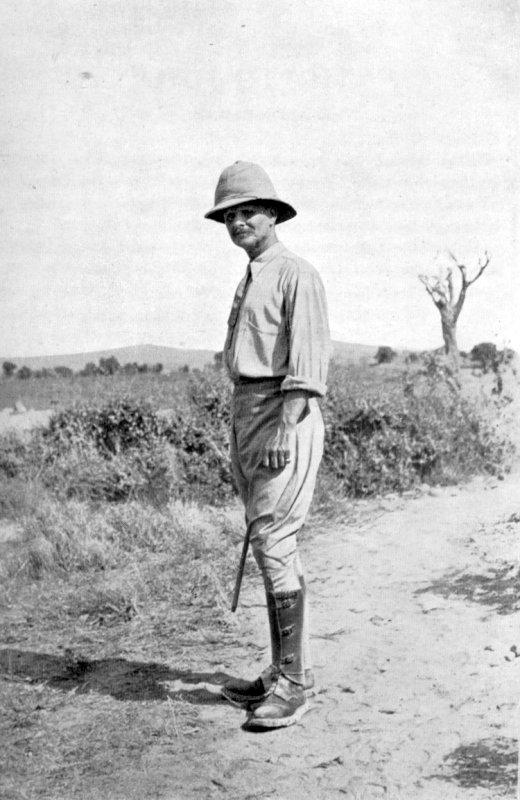
Lieutenant General Birdwood near Hill 60 in October 1915

The attack on Hill 60 was the last offensive action undertaken around Anzac by the Allies prior to the evacuation in December 1915. Historian Chris Coulthard-Clark describes the battle as a series of "...badly handled attacks which resulted in costly and confused fighting". The Allies were ultimately unsuccessful in capturing the hill's summit, although according to Brad Manera, the attack gained some advantage for the Allies, stating that by capturing the "seaward slopes, the Anzac flank was secured and the link with Suvla opened". Nevertheless, it proved costly with the Allies suffering over 1,100 casualties; the Australian 18th Battalion alone was reduced to one third of its original strength after less than a fortnight of action. One Australian, Second Lieutenant Hugo Throssell of the 10th Light Horse, received the Victoria Cross for his actions during the battle, the last VC to be awarded on the peninsula.

General Ian Hamilton, the overall Allied commander, recorded on 29 August that "this evening we were all in good form owing to the news from Anzac. Knoll 60, now ours throughout, commands the Biyuk Anafarta valley with view and fire —a big tactical scoop." This was based on a report from Birdwood who mistakenly believed that the knoll itself had been taken, whereas in reality, the Turks still occupied half of Hill 60.

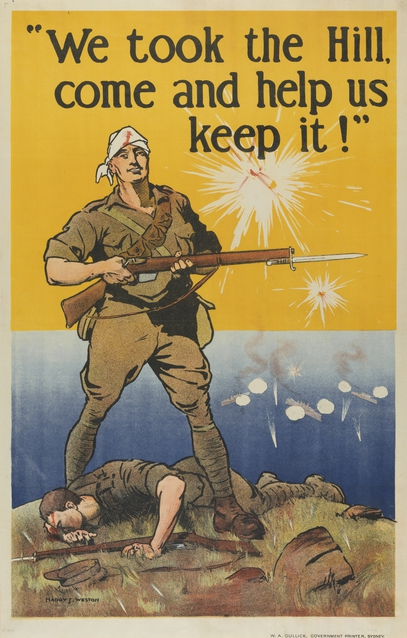
Australian recruiting poster, 1915

During November, New Zealand sappers drove a mine under Hill 60 creating a large crater at the summit though the Allies did not occupy it. The Turks later mined the Allied positions. The positions on Hill 60 were mined prior to evacuation on 12 December, which was scheduled for 45 minutes prior to the evacuation of Russell's Top. On the night of 19–20 December, all survivors of the Anzac front were evacuated from Gallipoli.

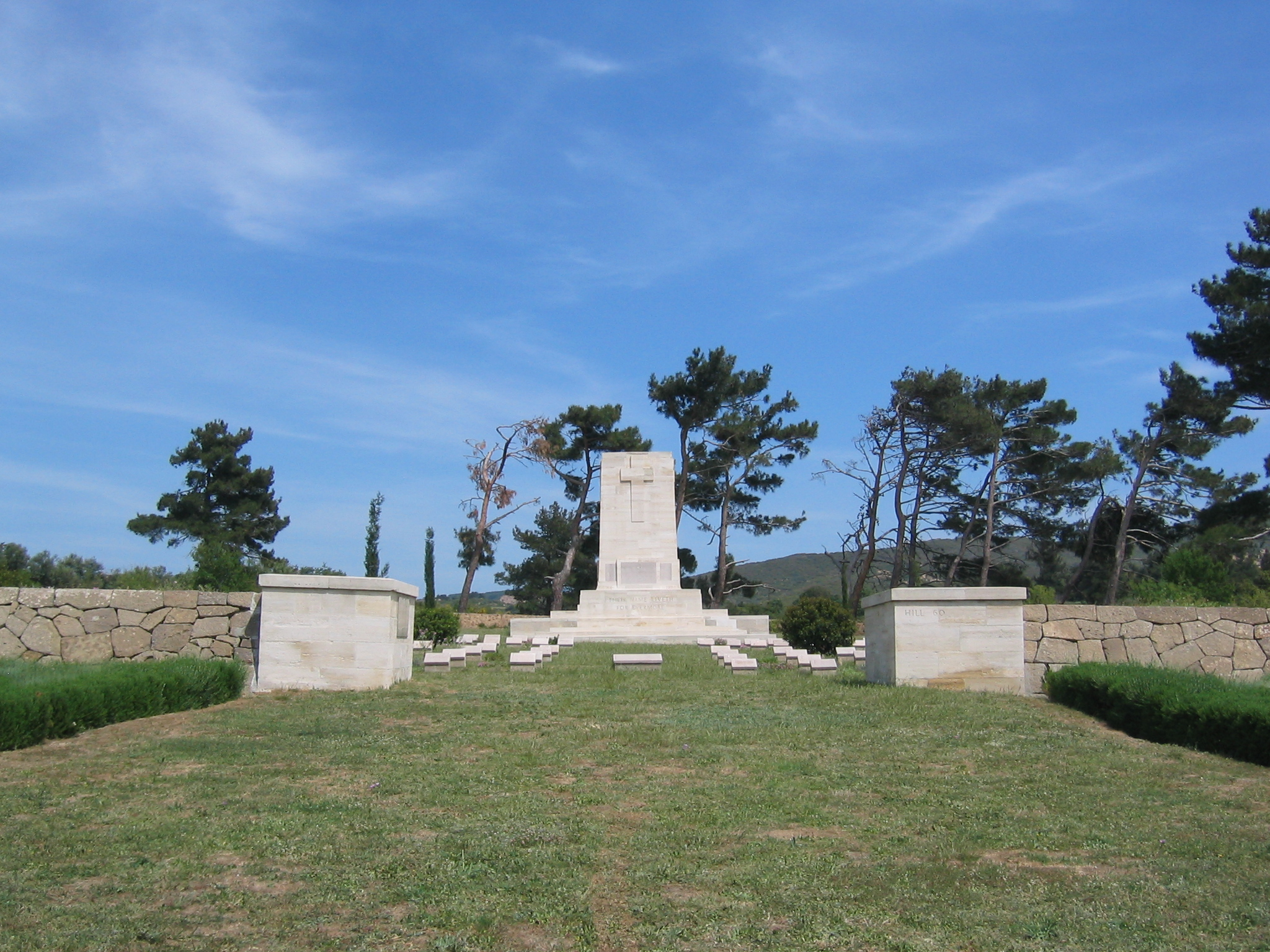
Hill 60 Cemetery

After the war, the peace treaty with Turkey included a provision for "full and exclusive rights of ownership over the land in which are situated the graves of those who fell in action, for the purpose of laying out cemeteries or erecting memorials". In 1920, the Central Graves unit handed over the cemetery to the Imperial War Graves Commission. Today, the hill is the location of the Hill 60 Commonwealth War Graves Commission Cemetery.
