= 1921 South Africa rugby union tour of Australia and New Zealand =

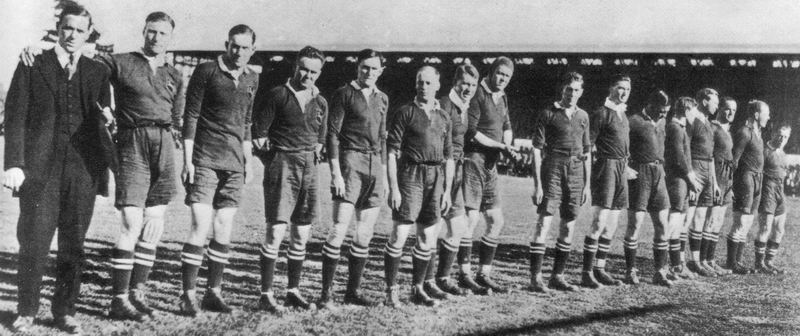
- The South Africa side for their first ever Test match against New Zealand
Summary
P	W	D	L
Total
24	20	2	2
Test match
3	1	1	1
Opponent
P	W	D	L
(New South Wales) NSW Waratahs (Note: The three matches played by New South Wales were retroactively accorded Test status by the Australian Rugby Union in 1986, but remain as tour matches only for the SARU.)
3	3	0	0
New Zealand
3	1	1	1

Tour chronology
- ← 1912–13 Europe 1931–32 Britain & Ireland →

The 1921 South Africa rugby union tour of Australia and New Zealand was the third tour made by the Springboks rugby team, and their first tour to Australia and New Zealand. South Africa played three Test matches against the All Blacks. The series was drawn 1–all, and the long-running controversy between the countries over the All Blacks' inclusion of Maori players began.

The Springboks played five matches in Australia, winning them all. The three most important matches against New South Wales, were retroactively accorded Test status by the Australian Rugby Union in 1986, but remain as tour matches only for the South African Rugby Board.

South Africa then played nineteen matches in New Zealand, winning fifteen, losing two and drawing two.

== Match summary ==
Complete list of matches played by the Springboks in Australia and New Zealand

Test matches

#	Date	Rival	City	Venue	Country	Score
1	18 Jun	(Victoria (state)) Victoria XV	Melbourne		Australia	51–0
2	25 Jun	New South Wales	Sydney	Showground	Australia	25–10
3	27 Jun	New South Wales	Sydney	Showground	Australia	16–11
4	2 Jul	New South Wales	Sydney	University Oval	Australia	28–9
5	6 Jul	(Sydney) Metropolitan	Sydney		Australia	14–8
6	13 Jul	Wanganui	Wanganui	Cooks Gardens	New Zealand	11–6
7	16 Jul	Taranaki	Taranaki	Pukekura Park	New Zealand	0–0
8	20 Jul	Wairarapa	Masterton	Memorial Park	New Zealand	18–3
9	23 Jul	Wellington	Wellington	Athletic Park	New Zealand	8–3
10	27 Jul	West Coast-Buller	Greymouth	Rugby Park	New Zealand	33–3
11	30 Jul	Canterbury	Christchurch	Lancaster Park	New Zealand	4–6
12	3 Aug	South Canterbury	Timaru	Fraser Park	New Zealand	34–3
13	6 Aug	Southland	Invercargill	Rugby Park	New Zealand	12–0
14	10 Aug	Otago	Dunedin	Carisbrook	New Zealand	11-3
15	13 Aug	New Zealand	Dunedin	Carisbrook	New Zealand	5–13
16	17 Aug	Manawatu / Horowhenua	Palmerston North	Palmerston North Showgrounds	New Zealand	3–0
17	20 Aug	Auckland / North Auckland	Auckland	Eden Park	New Zealand	24–8
18	24 Aug	Bay of Plenty	Rotorua	Arawa Park	New Zealand	17–9
19	27 Aug	New Zealand	Auckland	Eden Park	New Zealand	9–5
20	30 Aug	Waikato	Hamilton	Claudelands Racecourse	New Zealand	6–0
21	3 Sep	Hawke's Bay / Poverty Bay	Napier	McLean Park	New Zealand	14–8
22	7 Sep	New Zealand Māori	Napier	McLean Park	New Zealand	9–8
23	10 Sep	Nelson / Golden Bay-Motueka / Marlborough	Nelson	Trafalgar Park	New Zealand	26–3
24	17 Sep	New Zealand	Wellington	Athletic Park	New Zealand	0–0

Notes

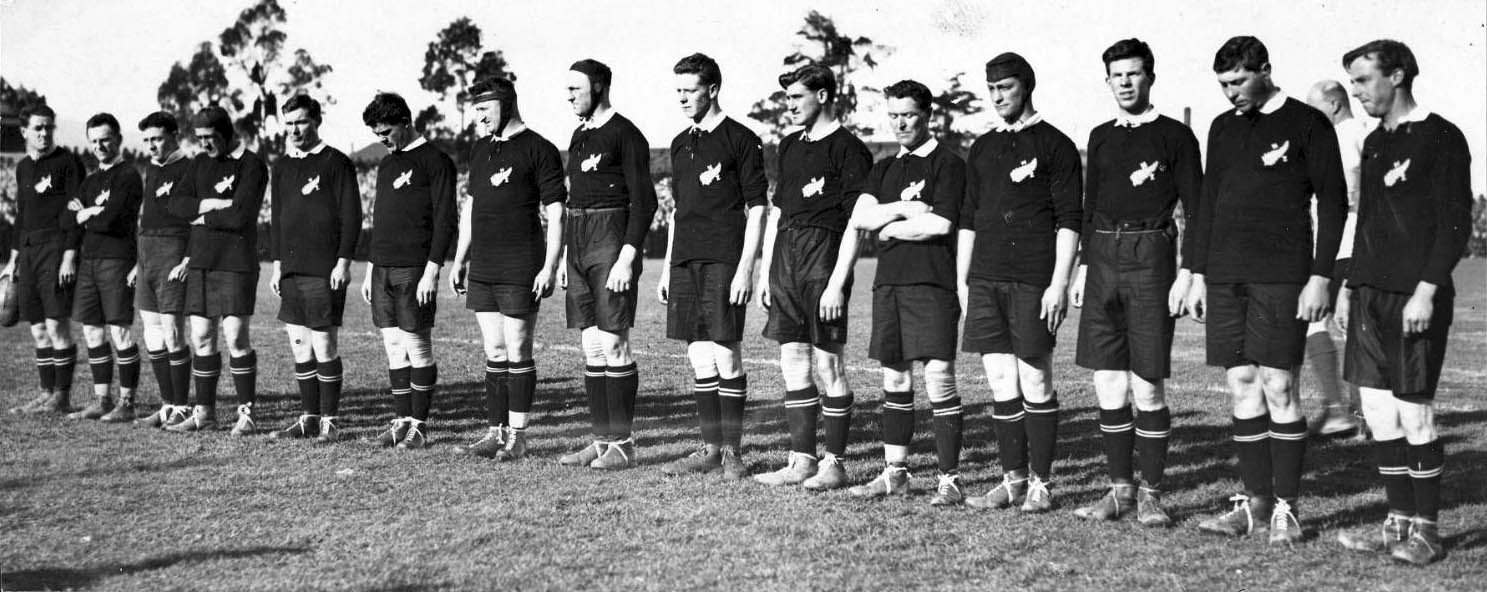
The New Zealand team that played the first test v the Springboks on 13 August

Balance
Played in	Pl	W	D	L	Ps	Pc
Australia	5	5	0	0	134	38
New Zealand	19	15	2	2	244	81
Total	24	20	2	2	378	119

== Match details ==
=== First Test ===
13 August 1921

New Zealand	13–5	South Africa
Try: Belliss; Steel; Storey; Con: M. Nicholls (2)	Report	Try: van Heerden; Con: G. Morkel

Carisbrook, Dunedin
Attendance: 25,000
Referee: Edward McKenzie

New Zealand	South Africa

FB	Charles Kingstone
W	Jack Steel
C	George Aitken (c)
C	Mark Nicholls
W	Percy Storey
FH	Ces Badeley
SH	Harry Nicholls
WF	Jim Donald
P	Ned Hughes
P	Bill Duncan
F	Richard Fogarty
L	Jim Moffitt
L	Jock Richardson
F	Moke Belliss
L	Andrew White

FB	Gerhard Morkel
W	Attie van Heerden
C	Charlie Meyer
C	Wally Clarkson
W	Henry Morkel
FH	Mannetjies Michau
SH	Taffy Townsend
P	Frank Mellish
H	Theuns Kruger
P	Phil Mostert
L	Baby Michau
L	Harry Morkel
F	Alf Walker
F	Tokkie Scholtz
N8	Boy Morkel (c)

=== Second Test ===
27 August 1921

New Zealand	5–9	South Africa
Try: McLean; Con: M. Nicholls	Report	Try: Sendin; Con: G. Morkel; Drop: G. Morkel

Eden Park, Auckland
Attendance: 40,000
Referee: Alf Neilson

New Zealand	South Africa

FB	Charles Kingstone
W	John Steel
C	George Aitken (c)
C	Mark Nicholls
W	Percival Storey
FH	Cecil Badeley
SH	Edward Roberts
WF	Jim Donald
P	Ned Hughes
P	Bill Duncan
F	Les McLean
L	Jim Moffitt
L	Jock Richardson
F	Moke Belliss
L	Alfred West

FB	Gerhard Morkel
W	Henry Morkel
C	Billy Sendin
C	Wally Clarkson
W	Bill Zeller
FH	Charlie Meyer
SH	Mannetjies Michau
P	Nic du Plessis
H	Theuns Kruger
P	Phil Mostert
L	Tank van Rooyen
L	Royal Morkel
F	Mervyn Ellis
F	Tokkie Scholtz
N8	Boy Morkel (c)

=== Third Test ===
17 September 1921

New Zealand	0–0	South Africa
	Report

Athletic Park, Wellington
Attendance: 35,000
Referee: Alf Neilson

New Zealand	South Africa

FB	Charles Kingstone
W	John Steel
C	Mark Nicholls
C	Karl Ifwersen
W	Keith Siddells
FH	Billy Fea
SH	Edward Roberts (c)
WF	Moke Belliss
P	Richard Fogarty
P	Bill Duncan
F	Les McLean
L	Jim Moffitt
L	Jock Richardson
F	Charles Fletcher
L	Alfred West

FB	Gerhard Morkel
W	Attie van Heerden
C	Charlie Meyer
C	Sarel Strauss
W	Bill Zeller
FH	Sas de Kock
SH	Mannetjies Michau
P	Frank Mellish
H	Phil Mostert
P	Nic du Plessis
L	Tank van Rooyen
L	Royal Morkel
F	Mervyn Ellis
F	Alf Walker
N8	Boy Morkel (c)

== See also ==
- History of rugby union matches between New Zealand and South Africa
