= Michau =

Michau is a surname. Notable people with the name include:

- Baby Michau (1890–1945), South African international rugby union player
- Friedrich Michau (born 1979), German international rugby union player
- Mannetjies Michau (1900–1960), South African international rugby union player
- Marcelle Michau (born 1963), South African cricketer
- Théobald Michau (1676–1765), conservative Walloon painter of landscapes

== See also ==
- Code Michau, legal proposals by Michel de Marillac (1563–1632)
- Michau Warriors F.C., South African soccer club
