= 1927 in sports =

1927 in sports describes the year's events in world sport.

== American football ==
- NFL championship – New York Giants (11–1–1)
- Rose Bowl (1926 season):
  - The Stanford Indians tie 7–7 with the Alabama Crimson Tide to split the national championship
- College football national championship – Illinois Fighting Illini

== Association football ==
Colombia

- America de Cali was founded on February 13.

England

- The Football League – Newcastle United 56 points, Huddersfield Town 51, Sunderland 49, Bolton Wanderers 48, Burnley 47, West Ham United 46
- FA Cup final – Cardiff City 1–0 Arsenal at Empire Stadium, Wembley, London
- Cardiff City's FA Cup victory remains the only time the competition has been won by a club outside England.

Germany

- National Championship – 1. FC Nürnberg 2–0 Hertha BSC at Berlin. It is the first match to be broadcast in full on German radio.

Italy

- AS Roma is founded by Italo Foschi, who initiates the merger of three older Italian Football Championship clubs from the city of Rome: Roman FC, SS Alba-Audace and Fortitudo-Pro Roma SGS.

Mexico

- Formation of the Mexican Football Federation (Federación Mexicana de Fútbol Asociación or FMF). It is also known as Femexfut.

Ukraine

- FC Dynamo Kyiv founded in former part of Soviet Union

== Australian rules football ==
VFL Premiership

- Collingwood wins the 31st VFL Premiership, beating Richmond 2.13 (25) to 1.7 (13) in the 1927 VFL Grand Final
  - The low scores, caused by a torrential fall of rain on the day before and during the match, set many records:
1. The lowest winning score since 1901 when Collingwood beat Fitzroy 3.6 (24) to 2.7 (19)
2. Richmond's score is the equal fourth lowest since 1915 and their second lowest score ever, behind 0.8 (8) against St. Kilda in 1961.
3. The aggregate score of 3.20 (38) is the lowest since 1900
4. It is the only time since 1908 a team has won scoring only two goals

Brownlow Medal

- The annual Brownlow Medal is awarded to Syd Coventry (Collingwood)

== Bandy ==
Sweden

- Championship final – IK Göta 5-1 Västerås SK

== Baseball ==
World Series

- 5–8 October — New York Yankees (AL) defeats Pittsburgh Pirates (NL) to win the 1927 World Series by 4 games to 0

Major League Baseball

- Babe Ruth hits 60 home runs, setting a major league record

Negro leagues

- For the second straight year, the Chicago American Giants (NNL) defeats the Bacharach Giants of Atlantic City, New Jersey (ECL), 5 games to 3, in the Negro World Series

== Basketball ==
Events

- January 7 – American exhibition basketball team Harlem Globetrotters, founded by Abe Saperstein in 1926, played their first road game in Hinckley, Illinois

ABL Championship

- Brooklyn Celtics over Cleveland Rosenblums (3–0)

Greece

- A first game for professional league of Greece, Panhellenic Basketball League, as predecessor for Greek Basket League held. G.S. Iraklis B.C.

== Boxing ==
Events

- In one of the most famous fights in boxing history, Gene Tunney successfully defends his World Heavyweight Championship in a return bout with Jack Dempsey at Soldier Field, Chicago. Tunney wins in 10 rounds but the fight is remembered as The Battle Of The Long Count after Tunney was knocked down for 13 seconds in the 7th round, the count being delayed because Dempsey did not retire to a neutral corner.

Lineal world champions

- World Heavyweight Championship – Gene Tunney
- World Light Heavyweight Championship – Jack Delaney → vacant → Tommy Loughran
- World Middleweight Championship – Mickey Walker
- World Welterweight Championship – Pete Latzo → Joe Dundee
- World Lightweight Championship – Sammy Mandell
- World Featherweight Championship – vacant
- World Bantamweight Championship – Charley Phil Rosenberg → vacant
- World Flyweight Championship – vacant

== Canadian football ==
Grey Cup

- 15th Grey Cup – Toronto Balmy Beach 9–6 Hamilton Tigers

== Cricket ==
Events

- New Zealand tours England with a team containing many players who will later play Test cricket for New Zealand. However, this tour does not include any Test matches and the 1927 English cricket season is the last, apart from the Second World War years and the cancelled South African tour of 1970, in which there has been no Test cricket in England.

England

- County Championship – Lancashire
- Minor Counties Championship – Staffordshire
- Most runs – Wally Hammond 2969 @ 69.04 (HS 197)
- Most wickets – Charlie Parker 193 @ 19.94 (BB 9–46)
- Wisden Cricketers of the Year – Roger Blunt, Charlie Hallows, Wally Hammond, Douglas Jardine, Vallance Jupp

Australia

- Sheffield Shield – South Australia
- Most runs – Bill Ponsford 1229 @ 122.90 (HS 352)
- Most wickets – Norman Williams 35 @ 32.02 (BB 6–88)

India

- Bombay Quadrangular – Hindus

New Zealand

- Plunket Shield – Auckland

South Africa

- Currie Cup – Western Province

West Indies

- Inter-Colonial Tournament – Barbados

== Cycling ==
Tour de France

- Nicolas Frantz (Luxembourg) wins the 21st Tour de France

== Figure skating ==
World Figure Skating Championships

- World Women's Champion – Sonja Henie (Norway)
- World Men's Champion – Willi Böckel (Austria)
- World Pairs Champions – Herma Szabo and Ludwig Wrede (Austria)

== Golf ==
Major tournaments

- British Open – Bobby Jones
- US Open – Tommy Armour
- USPGA Championship – Walter Hagen

Ryder Cup

- Inaugural Ryder Cup is held at Worcester, Massachusetts: United States defeats Great Britain by 9 1/2 to 2 1/2.

Other tournaments

- British Amateur – William Tweddell
- US Amateur – Bobby Jones

== Horse racing ==
Events

- The inaugural Champion Hurdle is run as part of the Cheltenham Festival.

England

- Champion Hurdle – Blaris
- Cheltenham Gold Cup – Thrown In
- Grand National – Sprig
- 1,000 Guineas Stakes – Cresta Run
- 2,000 Guineas Stakes – Adam's Apple
- The Derby – Call Boy
- The Oaks – Beam
- St. Leger Stakes – Book Law

Australia

- Melbourne Cup – Trivalve

Canada

- King's Plate – Troutlet

France

- Prix de l'Arc de Triomphe – Mon Talisman

Ireland

- Irish Grand National – Jerpoint
- Irish Derby Stakes – Knight of the Grail

USA

- Kentucky Derby – Whiskery
- Preakness Stakes – Bostonian
- Belmont Stakes – Chance Shot

== Ice hockey ==
Stanley Cup

- 4–13 April — Ottawa Senators defeats Boston Bruins in the 1927 Stanley Cup Finals by 2 games to 0

Events

- Memorial Cup – Owen Sound Greys defeats Port Arthur West End Juniors
- Allan Cup – University of Toronto Grads defeats Fort William Thundering Herd at Vancouver, British Columbia
- 14 February – Conn Smythe purchases the Toronto St. Patricks of the NHL and changes the name to the Toronto Maple Leafs.

== Multi-sport events ==
Far Eastern Championship Games

- 8th Far Eastern Championship Games is held at Shanghai, Republic of China

== Nordic skiing ==
FIS Nordic World Ski Championships

- 3rd FIS Nordic World Ski Championships 1927 are held at Cortina d'Ampezzo, Italy

== Rowing ==
The Boat Race

- 2 April — Cambridge wins the 79th Oxford and Cambridge Boat Race

== Rugby league ==
England

- Championship – Swinton
- Challenge Cup final – Oldham 26–7 Swinton at Central Park, Wigan
- Lancashire League Championship – St Helens Recs
- Yorkshire League Championship – Hull
- Lancashire County Cup – St. Helens 10–2 St Helens Recs
- Yorkshire County Cup – Huddersfield 10–3 Wakefield Trinity

Australia

- NSW Premiership – South Sydney 20–11 St George (grand final)

== Rugby union ==
Five Nations Championship

- 40th Five Nations Championship series is shared by Ireland and Scotland

== Snooker ==
World Championship

- Inaugural World Snooker Championship is won by Joe Davis who defeats Tom Dennis 20–11

== Speed skating ==
Speed Skating World Championships

- Men's All-round Champion – Bernt Evensen (Norway)

== Tennis ==
Australia

- Australian Men's Singles Championship – Gerald Patterson (Australia) defeats John Hawkes (Australia) 3–6 6–4 3–6 18–16 6–3
- Australian Women's Singles Championship – Esna Boyd Robertson (Australia) defeats Sylvia Lance Harper (Australia) 5–7 6–1 6–2

England

- Wimbledon Men's Singles Championship – Henri Cochet (France) defeats Jean Borotra (France) 4–6 4–6 6–3 6–4 7–5
- Wimbledon Women's Singles Championship – Helen Wills Moody (USA) defeats Lilí de Álvarez (Spain) 6–2 6–4

France

- French Men's Singles Championship – René Lacoste (France) defeats Bill Tilden (USA) 6–4 4–6 5–7 6–3 11–9
- French Women's Singles Championship – Kea Bouman (Netherlands) defeats Irene Bowder Peacock (South Africa) 6–2 6–4

USA

- American Men's Singles Championship – René Lacoste (France) defeats Bill Tilden (USA) 11–9 6–3 11–9
- American Women's Singles Championship – Helen Wills Moody (USA) defeats Betty Nuthall Shoemaker (Great Britain) 6–1 6–4

Davis Cup

- 1927 International Lawn Tennis Challenge – France 3–2 United States at Germantown Cricket Club (grass) Philadelphia, United States
