= Sas de Kock =

South African rugby union player

- Full name: Josias Servaas de Kock
- Born: 17 August 1896 Caledon, South Africa
- Died: 4 November 1972 (aged 76)
- Height: 1.68 m (5 ft 6 in)
- Weight: 64.4 kg (142 lb)

Rugby union career
- Position: Fly–half / Centre
International career
Years	Team	Apps	(Points)
1921	South Africa	2	(0)

Josias Servaas de Kock (17 August 1896 – 4 November 1972) was a South African international rugby union player.

Born in Caledon, de Kock was educated at Overberg High School and Stellenbosch University, where he formed a halfback partnership with Mannetjies Michau under the coaching of Oubaas Mark.

Capped twice for the Springboks, de Kock had an injury prone tour of Australia and New Zealand in 1921, playing only the final Test against the All Blacks, then had a home Test match against the British Lions in 1924.

A teacher by profession, de Kock was deputy principal of Outeniqua High School, as well as rugby coach.

== See also ==
- List of South Africa national rugby union players
