= Hottentots Holland High School =

Public high school in Somerset West, South Africa

Hottentots-Holland High School

Location
- Somerset West; South Africa
- 34°5′34″S 18°50′43″E

Information
- Type: High School - Public
- Motto: Sibi Fidelis Ipsi
- Established: 1930
- School district: Metropole East
- Principal: Mr F. Fouchè
- Staff: 52
- Grades: 8 - 12
- Enrollment: 1,232
- Colors: Black, Maroon, Gold
- Mascot: Shark
- Website: www.hhhs.co.za

Hottentots-Holland High School is an Afrikaans- and English-speaking school in the Western Cape in South Africa, situated between the towns of Somerset West and Strand. The parallel-medium, co-educational school, situated to the northeast of the N2 national road, was opened at its current site by Dr G. G. (Gawie) Cillie, Chairman of the School Board, in February, 1930. A portion of the land on which it now stands having been given by Mesdames Beynon and Osler, daughters of an early Somerset West shopkeeper and property owner. At this time the school had an enrollment of 220 pupils and a staff of 11 under Mr A. J. Ackerman. The school motto "Sibi Fidelis Ipsi" is Latin for "True To Oneself". Prior to 1930, the school operated under the name Somerset West Public School.

As of 2013, it has 1,232 students and 52 teachers. It has students registered in grades 8 through 12.

The school enjoys a strong sporting rivalry with its neighbour high schools, Hoërskool Strand and Parel Vallei High School.

The school is a site for students in the Scientific and Industrial Leadership Initiative (SAILI), a non-profit programme for promising science and engineering pupils which was set up in 2002 by the heads of the four universities in the province after they became frustrated at the low skills levels of first-year students.

SAILI identifies students in low-income families in the second-last year of primary schooling and provides catch-up and reinforcement classes, after which they can enter good quality high schools such as Hottentots Holland. They continue to take classes every two Saturdays at venues such as the MTN Sciencentre for the first two years of high school, after which they take booster lessons at the Cape Peninsula University of Technology.

== Notable alumni ==
- Adriaan Carelse, a South African rugby union player who has built a professional career as a versatile back for various teams, including the Boland Cavaliers in South Africa and the Chicago Hounds in Major League Rugby.
- Beáta Bena Green, is a South African actress, producer, and media creative widely recognized for her television roles as Kim Claasen in Arendsvlei, Shady Vermeulen in 7de Laan, and Shay in Wyfie. Matric 2014.
- Maria Valente de Almeida, a South African actress and model best known for her starring role as Samantha Abrahams in the kykNET & kie soapie Arendsvlei. Matric 2011.
- Shamilla Ismael Miller, known professionally as Shamilla Miller, a South African actress and model best known for her television roles in popular series like Netflix's Blood & Water, Showmax's The Girl From St. Agnes, and the BBC series Troy: Fall of a City. Matric 2005.
- Rouxmia Bougas, a former model and reality TV contestant, famous for her appearances in FHM Magazine. Matric 2004.
- Jo-Ann Strauss, TV presenter, model, public speaker and businesswoman and Miss South Africa 2000. Matric 1998.
- Trevor Immelman, professional golfer and winner of the 2008 Masters Tournament
- Nina Swart, a South African television and film director, accomplished Director of Photography, and former actress who is best known for her on-screen roles in soap operas like 7de Laan and for directing local dramas, reality shows, and Netflix titles like Tuiskoms.
- Lise Swart, a South African singer, actress, and media personality who is best known for presenting various Afrikaans television shows, such as Roer! and Kwêla, and for producing and hosting the popular mental health radio program Wie is ek? on RSG.
- Deon Lotter, SA rugby Springbok - 1993
- Belinda van Heerden, former Judge of Appeal at the Supreme Court of Appeal, Bloemfontein
- Ballie Wahl, SA rugby Springbok - 1949
- Eddie Stuart, SA soccer Springbok - 1924
- Harry Morkel, SA rugby Springbok - 1921
- Theo Pienaar, SA rugby Springbok (Captain) - 1921
- Phil Mostert, SA rugby Springbok - 1921, 1924, 1928 and 1931
- Jacky Morkel, SA rugby Springbok - 1912
- Boy Morkel, SA rugby Springbok - 1910, 1912 and 1921

== Coat of arms ==
The school's coat of arms, based on that of Simon van der Stel, was registered in the name of the Old Students' Union with the Department of the Interior in April 1937. The registered description is : A shield bordered maroon and divided horizontally into two sections; in the top section on a black background a representation of a lamp in silver and in the lower section on an old gold background representations of three castles in maroon placed equidistant two above and one below, with the inscription O.S.U. and the motto SIBI FIDELIS IPSI. The "castles" are actually towers.
