= Theo Pienaar =

South African rugby union player (1888–1960)

- Born: Theodorus Barend Pienaar; 23 November 1888 Barrydale, Cape Colony
- Died: 14 November 1960 (aged 71) Johannesburg, Transvaal
- School: Hottentots Holland High School, Somerset West
- University: Victoria College, Stellenbosch

Rugby union career
- Position: Forward
Provincial / State sides
Years	Team	Apps	(Points)
1914–1922	Western Province		
International career
Years	Team	Apps	(Points)
1921	South Africa (tour)		

Theodorus Barend Pienaar (23 November 1888 – 14 November 1960) was a South African rugby union player.

He received his schooling in Somerset West and then went to Victoria College in 1907, where he obtained his degree and teacher's diploma.

From 1908 to 1914 he played for Stellenbosch, first as captain of the under–19A and later of the first team. In 1915, as captain, Pienaar helped Malmesbury win the Grand Challenge Cup, the club competition in the Western Province and in 1920 and 1921 he was captain of Caledon. He played for Western Province from 1914 to 1922 and captained them against the combined New Zealand military team of 1919 and then again in the Currie Cup competition in 1920.

In 1921, Pienaar was selected as captain for the Springbok team that undertook a tour to Australia and New Zealand for the first time. He was already 32 years old at the time and it was also the first time that a player on an overseas tour becomes captain with his first appearance for a Springbok team. During the tour Pienaar was injured and consequently did not play in any Tests, but he did play 10 tour matches.

Pienaar became South African Selector in 1928 and served on that committee until 1931 when he was elected Manager of Bennie Osler's Springbok team that toured Britain and Ireland in 1931–32.

== See also ==
- List of South Africa national rugby union players – Springbok no. 164

Sporting positions
Preceded by Uncle Dobbin	Springbok Captain; 1921	Succeeded by Boy Morkel
