= Jim Donald =

Jim Donald may refer to:

- Jim Donald (politician) (1895–1976), member of the Queensland Legislative Assembly
- Jim Donald (businessman), CEO of Starbucks
- Jim Donald (footballer), with Dumfries club Queen of the South
- Jim Donald (rugby union) (1898–1981), New Zealand rugby player

== See also ==
- James Donald (disambiguation)
