= Pieter Kuyper Albertyn =

South African rugby union player

PK Albertyn
- Born: Pieter Kuyper Albertyn; 27 May 1897 Kleinmond, Cape Colony
- Died: 7 March 1973 (aged 75) Cape Town, Cape Province
- Height: 1.8 m (5 ft 11 in)
- Weight: 80 kg (176 lb)
- School: Stellenbosch Boys' High
- University: Victoria College; Guy's Hospital

Rugby union career
- Position(s): Centre, Wing
Provincial / State sides
Years	Team	Apps	(Points)
–	South Western Districts		
International career
Years	Team	Apps	(Points)
1924	South Africa	4	(3)

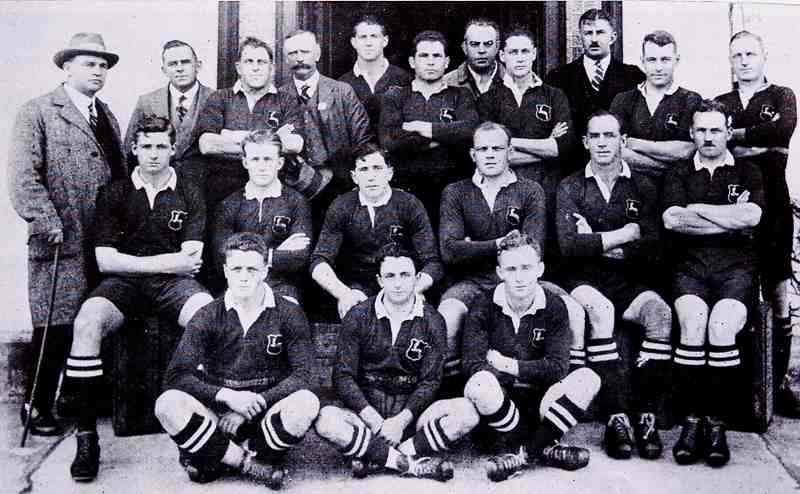
South Africa's national rugby team in 1924; Albertyn is the captain

Pieter Kuyper Albertyn (27 May 1897 – 7 March 1973), known as "PK" or "Pierre", was a South African rugby union player and 15th captain of the South Africa national rugby union team.

== Biography ==
Born in the small coastal town, Kleinmond, Albertyn received his schooling at the Stellenbosch Boys' High, after which he went on to the Victoria College in Stellenbosch. During his studies he represented the Maties on the rugby field and played mainly wing, where he was able to utilize his great speed. In 1919, Albertyn was selected to play against the combined New Zealand military team. In this match he injured his knee in such a way that it threatened to end his rugby career. After the injury and in an effort to protect his knee, he was obliged to switch to centre. In October 1920, Albertyn went to Guy's Hospital, London to study dentistry and on his return to South Africa in June 1923, he settled in George where he practiced as a dentist.

Before the 1924 tour of the British Islands to South Africa, the Sprinbok selectors held trials after which a provisional team was selected. Albertyn was not invited to the trials nor was he selected for the team. A practice match in Durban was arranged for the provisional team and it was then that Albertyn, even before he played any provincial matches, received a request from Oubaas Mark, a national selector, to be in Durban for the match. Albertyn was subsequently selected for the first test, as centre and captain of the team. He captained the Springboks in all four test matches in the series against the British Isles, scoring a try in the second test.

=== Test history ===
No.	Opponents	Results (SA 1st)	Position	Tries	Dates	Venue
1.	(United Kingdom) British Isles	7–3	Centre (c)		16 Aug 1924	Kingsmead, Durban
2.	(United Kingdom) British Isles	17–0	Centre (c)	1	23 Aug 1924	Wanderers Stadium, Johannesburg
3.	(United Kingdom) British Isles	3–3	Centre (c)		13 Sep 1924	Crusaders Ground, Port Elizabeth
4.	(United Kingdom) British Isles	16–9	Centre (c)		20 Sep 1924	Newlands, Cape Town

== See also ==
- List of South Africa national rugby union players – Springbok no. 179

Sporting positions
Preceded by Boy Morkel	Springbok Captain; 1924	Succeeded by Phil Mostert
