= James Donald (disambiguation) =

James Donald (1917–1993) was an actor.

James Donald may also refer to:

- James Donald (politician) (1889–1971), politician in Auckland, New Zealand
- Jim Donald (rugby union) (James George Donald, 1898–1981), New Zealand rugby player

== See also ==
- Jim Donald (disambiguation)
