= Wally Clarkson =

South African rugby union player

- Full name: Walter Arthur Clarkson
- Born: 8 July 1896 Durban, South Africa
- Died: 3 June 1973 (aged 76)
- Height: 1.80 m (5 ft 11 in)
- Weight: 73 kg (161 lb)

Rugby union career
- Position: Centre
Provincial / State sides
Years	Team	Apps	(Points)
- Natal
International career
Years	Team	Apps	(Points)
1921–24	South Africa	3	(0)

Walter Arthur Clarkson (8 July 1896 – 3 June 1973) was a South African international rugby union player.

Clarkson was born in Durban and attended Maritzburg College.

Primarily a centre, Clarkson made his representative debut for Natal in 1919 and won a place on the Springboks squad for their 1921 tour of Australasia. He was described by the local New Zealand press as a "cool, reliable (and) solid" player, who possessed "plenty of pace". His tour included two capped appearances, against the All Blacks at Carisbrook and Eden Park. He obtained a third Springboks cap in 1924 against the touring British Lions.

== See also ==
- List of South Africa national rugby union players
