= Taffy Townsend =

Welsh-born South African rugby union player

- Full name: William Henry Townsend
- Born: 12 March 1895 Newport, Wales
- Died: 27 January 1943 (aged 47) Sicily, Italy
- Height: 1.64 m (5 ft 5 in)
- Weight: 71.7 kg (158 lb)

Rugby union career
- Position: Scrum–half
Provincial / State sides
Years	Team	Apps	(Points)
- Natal
International career
Years	Team	Apps	(Points)
1921	South Africa	1	(0)

William Henry "Taffy" Townsend (12 March 1895 – 27 January 1943) was a Welsh–born South African international rugby union player of the 1920s.

Born and raised in Newport, Wales, Townsend was employed briefly as a shipbroker's clerk upon leaving school, before departing for South Africa aged 18. He served with the Natal Mounted Rifles in World War I and his nickname "Taffy" was coined during his time as a soldier. After the war, Townsend waa based in Durban and worked as a diamond digger.

Townsend got experience against international opposition as a member of the South African Services side in the 1919 King's Cup. A scrum–half, Townsend played for Durban club Old Collegians and gained selection to the Springboks squad for their 1921 tour of Australia and New Zealand, where he turned out in ten fixtures. He scored the winning try against New Zealand Maori and played his only Test match against the All Blacks at Carisbrook.

During World War II, Townsend served as a bombardier with the South African Artillery 1AA Regiment and was involved in the North African campaign. After being captured by enemy forces sometime in 1942, Townsend died on 27 January 1943, while being held at a Sicilian prisoner of war camp. He is the only Springbok known to have been killed in the conflict.

== See also ==
- List of South Africa national rugby union players
