= Deon Lotter =

South African rugby union footballer

- Born: Deon Lotter; 10 November 1957 (age 69) Stellenbosch, Western Cape, South Africa
- Height: 1.97 m (6 ft 6 in)
- Weight: 108 kg (238 lb)
- School: Hottentots Holland High School, Somerset West, Western Cape
- University: Stellenbosch University

Rugby union career
- Position(s): Loose forward, Lock
Amateur team(s)
Years	Team	Apps	(Points)
- Maties
–	Ammosal		
–	Pirates		
Provincial / State sides
Years	Team	Apps	(Points)
1981–1982, 1985–1988	Western Province	40	
1983–1984	Griqualand West		
1989–1993	Transvaal		
International career
Years	Team	Apps	(Points)
1993	South Africa	3	

Deon Eugene Lotter (born 10 November 1957) is a former South African rugby union player.

== Playing career ==
Lotter first started playing rugby in his final year at school. After school and his national service, he enrolled at the Stellenbosch University for a degree in engineering. He made his debut for Western Province against Boland in a friendly match in 1981, replacing an injured Morne du Plessis. During his years with Western Province, he competed with players such as Theuns Stofberg, Kulu Ferreira and Gert Smal for a place in the first team. After obtaining his degree he spent two year at Griqualand West, after which he returned to Western Province. In 1989 Lotter moved to the Transvaal. He was part of the Transvaal team that won the Currie Cup in 1993.

Lotter made his test debut for South Africa during the 1993 French tour of South Africa, in second test on 3 July 1993 at Ellis Park in Johannesburg. In 1993 Lotter toured with the Springboks to Australia, playing in two of the three tests. Lotter played in three tests matches and four tour matches, scoring one try for the Springboks.

=== Test history ===
No.	Opponents	Results (SA 1st)	Position	Tries	Dates	Venue
1.	France	17–18 Flank	Flank	3 July 1993	Ellis Park, Johannesburg	
2.	Australia	19–12	Flank		31 July 1993	Sydney Football Stadium (SFG), Sydney
3.	Australia	20–28	Flank		14 August 1993	Ballymore Stadium, Brisbane

== See also ==
- List of South Africa national rugby union players – Springbok no. 588
