= Henry Morkel =

South African rugby union player

- Full name: Henry William Morkel
- Born: 14 July 1894 Somerset West, South Africa
- Died: 25 December 1969 (aged 75)
- Height: 1.84 m (6 ft 0 in)
- Weight: 81.6 kg (180 lb)

Rugby union career
- Position: Wing three–quarter
Provincial / State sides
Years	Team	Apps	(Points)
- Western Province
International career
Years	Team	Apps	(Points)
1921	South Africa	2	(0)

Henry William Morkel (14 July 1894 – 25 December 1969) was a South African international rugby union player.

Morkel was born in Somerset West and educated at Hottentots-Holland.

A pre–war Western Province representative, Morkel was a strong running, rather than pacy, wing three–quarter. His international opportunity came in 1921 as a member of the Springboks squad for a tour of Australia and New Zealand. He was one of five players with the surname Morkel in the touring party, and hailed from the same hometown as the others, but was the only one that wasn't a close relation. During the New Zealand leg, Morkel played on the right wing for the first two Test matches against the All Blacks, before succumbing to an elbow injury.

== See also ==
- List of South Africa national rugby union players
