= Tokkie Scholtz =

South African rugby union player

- Full name: Hugo Scholtz
- Born: 29 August 1891 Somerset West, South Africa
- Died: 8 April 1959 (aged 67) Stellenbosch, South Africa
- Height: 1.79 m (5 ft 10 in)
- Weight: 83.9 kg (185 lb)
- School: Paul Roos Gymnasium

Rugby union career
- Position: Wing–forward
Provincial / State sides
Years	Team	Apps	(Points)
- Western Province
International career
Years	Team	Apps	(Points)
1921	South Africa	2	(0)

Hugo "Tokkie" Scholtz (29 August 1891 – 8 April 1959) was a South African international rugby union player.

Scholtz was born in Somerset West and educated at Paul Roos Gymnasium.

A back row forward, Scholtz was a Springboks representative on their 1921 tour of Australia and New Zealand, playing two of the three Test matches against the All Blacks, at Carisbook and Eden Park.

Scoltz was a wine farmer by profession.

== See also ==
- List of South Africa national rugby union players
