= Scrum (rugby union) =

Means of restarting play after a minor infringement in rugby union

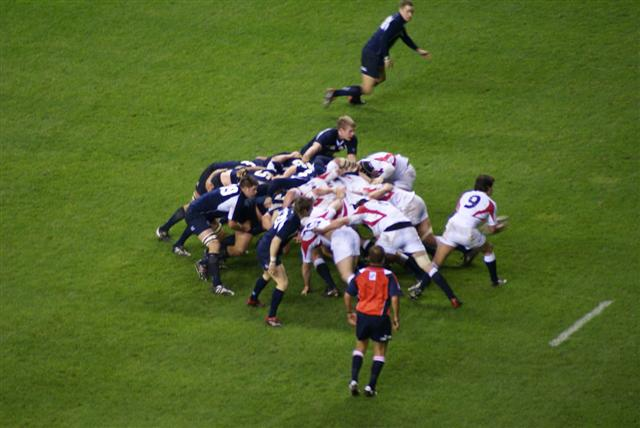
A scrum in an England versus Scotland international

In rugby union, a scrum is a means of restarting play after a minor infringement. It involves up to eight players from each team, known as the pack or forward pack, binding together in three rows and interlocking with the three opposing teams front row. At this point the ball is fed into the gap between the two forward packs and they both compete for the ball to win possession. Teams can be penalised for intentionally causing the scrum to collapse, and for not putting the ball into the scrum correctly. A scrum is most commonly awarded when the ball is knocked forward, or passed forward, or when a ball becomes trapped in a ruck or maul. Because of the physical nature of scrums, injuries can occur, especially in the front row.

== Overview ==
Diagram showing the relative body positions of the players in a Rugby union scrum.

To prepare for a scrum, each team's eight forwards (referred to as the pack or forward pack) bind together in three rows — the front row, second row and back row. The front row is composed of the two props and the hooker. To the left is the loosehead prop with the hooker in the middle, and the tighthead prop on the right (jersey numbers one, two and three). The "tighthead" prop, number three, earns that name as his head and shoulders sits between the hooker and the loosehead prop of the opposing side, meaning he sits in a "tighter" scrum position. The loosehead prop, by contrast, has one shoulder open to the outside of the scrum, and so is in a "looser" scrum position. The three bind together tightly and there is no gap between the hooker and either prop. According to the laws of the game; "When a player binds on a team-mate that player must use the whole arm from hand to shoulder to grasp the team-mate’s body at or below the level of the armpit." Failing to bind properly results in a penalty, and the opposition team being awarded a free kick.

The two second row forwards (jersey numbers four and five) bind together and directly behind the front row with each putting their heads between the props and the hooker. They are more commonly referred to as locks as they "lock" the scrum. Lastly the back row is made up of the two flankers and the number eight. The flankers bind on each side of the scrum — next to a lock and behind a prop. Generally the number seven flanker is referred to as the openside flanker, and with the number six flanker as the blindside flanker. "Openside" and "blindside" refer to the wide and narrow side of the pitch respectively, as scrums usually occur closer to one of the touchlines than the other. The openside flanker's job is to get to the next ruck or maul as quickly as possible, so they will usually bind on that side. The number 8 binds behind the two locks, with his/her head between them.

To form a scrum the two forward packs approach to within an arms length of each other. The referee gives the command crouch and the opposing front rows then crouch so that their backs are parallel to the ground and their head and shoulders are no lower than their hips; this crouching posture also allows them to isometrically preload their muscles enabling them to perform their subsequent drive more powerfully. The referee then calls bind and "using their outside arm each prop binds onto the point of the opposing prop’s outside shoulder." This command is to ensure that the two front rows are not too far apart. Finally the referee then says set (this is not a command, but rather permission to the front rows to engage) and the two front rows come together. When this happens both front rows thrust forward with the tighthead props' heads going between the opposing hooker and loosehead prop. The props then bind by gripping the back or side of the opposing prop's jersey.

The scrum-half from the team that has possession (referred to as having the feed or put in) then throws the ball in the gap formed between the two front rows, from the side where the hooker of his team is closest. This gap is called the tunnel. With the ball in the tunnel the two hookers (and sometimes the props) compete for possession by trying to hook the ball backwards with their feet, while the entire pack tries to push the opposing pack backwards. The side that wins possession usually transfers the ball to the back of the scrum — which is done with their feet. Once at the back it is picked up either by the number 8, or by the scrum-half. From here the ball is in play and the player with possession will either run, pass or kick the ball. On other occasions the forwards will hold the ball in the scrum by controlling it with their feet and try to gain ground by pushing the opposition backwards.

== Infringements ==
There are a large number of rules regarding the specifics of what can and cannot be done during a scrum. This is mainly for safety reasons, because if a scrum is not conducted properly there is a greater chance of injury. Many of the rules regard behaviour of the front row. Front rowers must engage square on, rather than bore in on an angle. The tight-head prop doing this limits the movement of the opposing hooker. As well, a loose-head prop pushing into the opposition tight-head prop's chest causing their body to pop out of the scrum. Both infringements are punished with penalties. Front-rowers are also banned from twisting their bodies, pulling opponents, or doing anything that might collapse the scrum. They must not push an opponent in the air. Finally, the back row must remain bound until the ball has left the scrum. For flankers, this means keeping one arm, up to the shoulder, in contact with the scrum. The number 8 must have both hands touching the scrum until the scrum has ended.

Other rules regard the scrum-halves and how they throw in the ball. The scrum must be stable, stationary and parallel to the goal-lines when they feed the ball; otherwise a free kick is awarded to the non-offending team. If the scrum is acceptable then the scrum-half must feed the ball into the scrum without delay. The referee will often warn a team and if the warning is not heeded the opposition is awarded a free kick. The ball must be fed into the middle of the tunnel with its major axis parallel to the ground and touchline. The ball must be thrown in quickly and in a single movement — this means that a feed cannot be faked. Once the ball has left the hands of the scrum-half the scrum has begun.

== Players ==
The front row are usually the stockiest members of the scrum. Hookers are normally smaller than props so they may manoeuvre their lower bodies within the tight confines of the front row and tunnel. Props and locks both need to be strong, but the positions differ in their main criteria for selection. Since props are more directly involved in wrestling for position and channelling the drive forward, strength and weight are of prime importance for them. Strength is also important for locks, since they also push; however, height is more important for them than it is for front-row players. Locks are virtually always the tallest players on the team; they are used as the primary contestants for possession in another phase of the game, the line-out. Flankers and the number 8 do less of the pushing in the scrum, and need more speed, because their task is to quickly tackle or cover the opposing half-backs if the opposition wins the scrum. Approximately 40% of the power of the scrum is produced in the front row itself. In most professional teams the forward pack weighs at least 800 kg (1764 lbs).

== Awarding ==
A scrum is awarded in a number of situations. The most common is if the ball has been knocked on (knocked forward) or passed forward. The two other major times when a scrum is called for is when someone is accidentally offside; or when the ball is trapped in a ruck or maul with no realistic chance of it being retrieved. The scrum feed goes to the team that did not offend, except in the case of the ball being trapped in a ruck or maul. In this situation the feed is awarded to the team that was "going forward" — that is, the team that had the forward momentum at the ruck. If the ball is held up at a maul, the scrum is awarded to the team not in possession when the maul started.

If a penalty is awarded for a more serious offence, the team to which it is awarded may elect to have a scrum rather than take a penalty kick or free kick. This usually happens when the attacking team is close to the opposition's goal-line, and wants to occupy all the opposition's forwards in one area to give the backs more space. They may also think they can force the scrum over the goal-line and score a "pushover" try.

A pushover try can occur the instant the ball touches the goal line. This is because a scrum is defined in the Laws of the Game to only exist within the field of play and not within the in-goal. Hence as soon as the ball reaches the line, the scrum ceases to exist and any player can ground the ball without risking a penalty for "handling in the scrum".

Pushover tries are rare, however, because scrums are awarded a minimum of five metres (16.4 ft) from either goal-line, and either touchline. This means for a pushover try to occur, the scrum must be forced several metres in one direction without collapsing.

== Safety ==
Scrums are one of the most dangerous phases in rugby, since a collapse or improper engage can lead to a front row player damaging or even breaking their neck. For this reason, only trained players may play in the front row to help avoid injuries. If a team is without sufficient specialist front row players, for example because of injury or sin-binning, all scrums may be "uncontested scrums". In this situation, the packs engage, but do not push, and the team that still puts the ball into the scrum must win it without effort. Teams use a Scrum machine to train players.

In 2006, a leading consultant surgeon in the UK has called for the ban of contested scrums, asserting they are too dangerous. There is very significant support for contested scrums however — former England hooker Brian Moore argued that "You would change the whole nature of the game and it would no longer be a game for all shapes and sizes as it is, uniquely, today."

== History ==
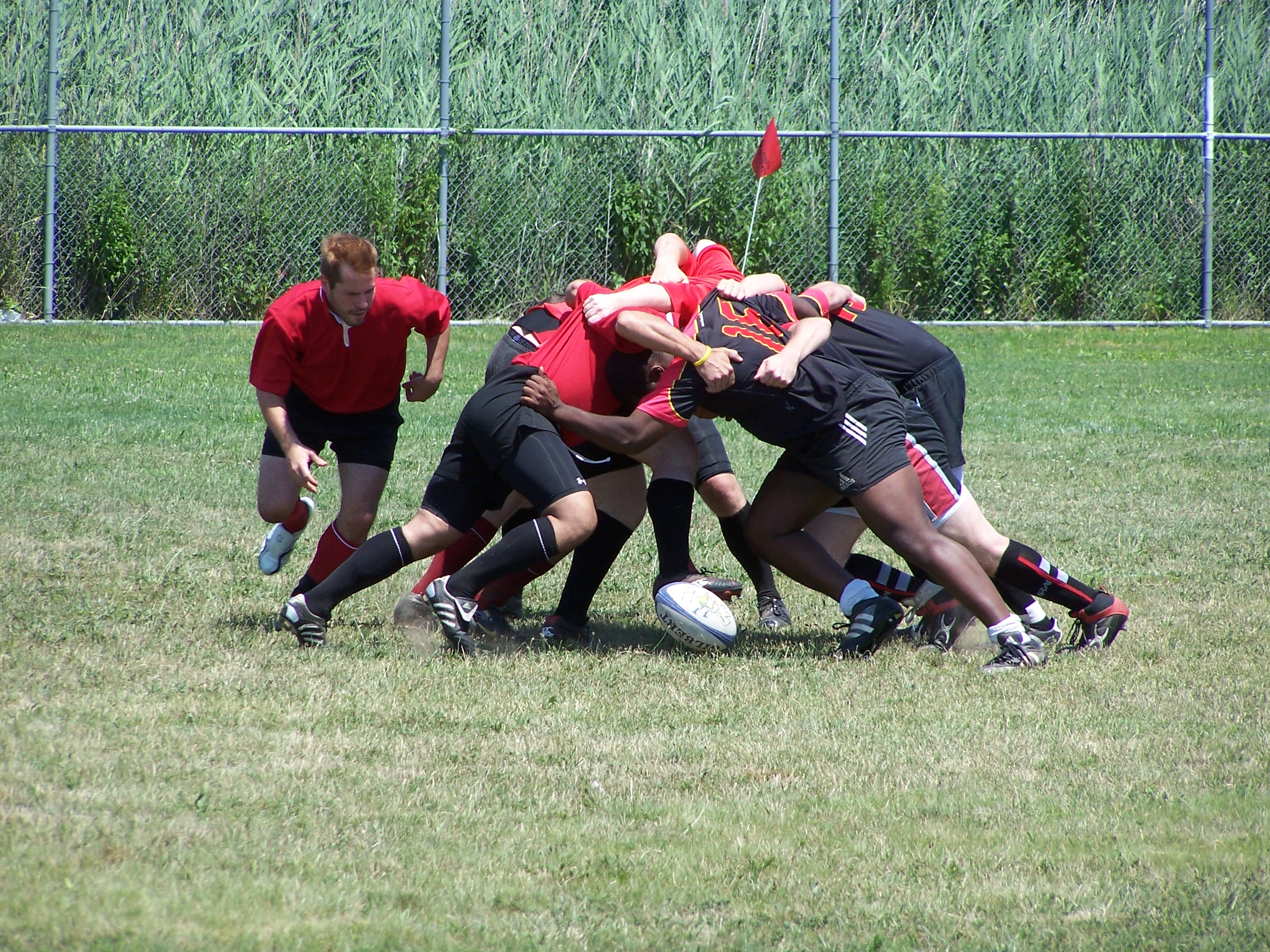
A scrum in rugby sevens

Like many aspects of rugby union, the scrum has evolved since the sport's invention. Many of the rules regarding the scrum have been changed. These changes have not always had the desired long-term effect, as many have been changed quite frequently.

Originally there was no distinction between an awarded or scrum and a loose scrum (today known as a ruck). The side awarded the scrum had one player put the ball on the ground and let go of it; there was no requirement of a tunnel. The onside line was dictated by the ball; so players were required to remain behind it. A scrum would most commonly be awarded when a stalemate occurred between the player with the ball, who would declare "held", and opposition holding him, who would call "Have it down". The early rules did not draw a clear distinction between players in or out of a scrum, and did not require players in the scrum to bind. The early rules of rugby, even after re-codification as "Laws of the Rugby Union", said the object of players in the scrum was to kick the ball towards their opponents' goal line. This provision remained in the laws for approximately 20 years after practice had changed in the late 19th century.

For a long time players did not have specific positions within a scrum. They adopted the "first up, first down" down method, with the first players to a scrum packing down in the front row and the rest of the forwards filling the remaining positions. Although the 1905 All Blacks are often credited with introducing specialised scrum positions, the 1888-1889 New Zealand Native football team had in fact practised this. As well, Thomas Ellison, one of the Natives, invented the 2-3-2 scrum formation. This seven man scrum was very popular in New Zealand until being outlawed in 1932. The extra man available because he was not in the scrum was called a wing forward and his job was to feed the ball into the scrum. Wing forwards were frequently accused of obstructing the opposing scrum-half, and this contributed to the International Rugby Football Board, later known as the International Rugby Board (IRB) and now as World Rugby (WR), outlawing a two-man front row.

Until the second half of the 20th century there were many configurations of scrum; including 3-2-3, 3-4-1 and 3-3-2.

The 1906 Springboks became "the first national team to utilize the 3-4-1 formation". South Africans credit Springbok Fairy Heatlie for developing the 3-4-1 formation in 1901 at the Villagers Rugby Club in Cape Town, fellow Villager Paddy Carolin for applying it on the 1906 South African tour of Britain, and Stellenbosch coach "Oubaas Mark" Markötter for perfecting it afterwards. Under Markötter's instigation, and that of his protégé Danie Craven, South Africa had by 1949 perfected the 3-4-1 scrum formation. The hooker bound very loosely, and could swing his body so that he could get his feet to the ball as soon as it was fed into the scrum. The two locks would not push on the hooker, but their props, to make this easier. This made it very difficult for the opposition to get anywhere near the ball before it was hooked to the back of the scrum. It was at this time the terms loosehead and tighthead entered rugby terminology. Ever since the team feeding the ball has had a significant advantage, and won their own ball much more frequently.

In the 1960s rule changes were introduced to try and limit the effect the loose forwards were having on back play. There was no obligation to bind to a scrum for flankers at this time. The offside line was dictated by the position of the ball even when it was in the scrum, and so when it emerged at the back of the scrum the scrum-half would often find the opposition flankers and scrum-half arriving with it. The new offside line became the hindmost foot of the scrum. Only the opposition scrum-half could move forward of that point, and all flankers had to stay bound unless they remained behind the hindmost foot of the scrum. Another rule change introduced allowed the number 8 or the rear-most bound forward to detach from a scrum with the ball, previously it could only be retrieved by the scrum-half.

=== The scrum in the professional era ===
Around 1996, the All Blacks came up with a strategy where their pack would push at the same time the hooker would strike for the ball. This not only meant they got the hooked ball, but also the opposition had to retreat to stay onside.

Eventually, other teams found out what the All Blacks were doing and copied them. Referees stopped enforcing the straight feed into the scrum, and as a result scrum-halves started feeding the ball further on their side of the scrum.

Opposing hookers gave up trying to hook for the ball and instead focused on adding power to the pack's drive. This turned the scrum from a hooking and pushing contest into one of power pushing, which led to a rise in collapsed scrums.

In 2007 the scrum law was amended to a four-step, "crouch", "touch", "pause", "engage" process in an attempt to control scrum engagement. Prior to this, there was no obligation for each prop to touch the opposing prop's shoulder, and the distance between the two front rows was often larger. The new rule fixed the distance between the front rows and as a result cut the force of impact from the engagement. The reason for the rule change was to reduce the number of serious neck injuries to front rowers.

The IRB made further changes to the laws in 2009 in an attempt to eliminate uncontested scrums. Beginning in the 2007–08 season, the IRB sanctioned a trial of the following new rules in France:

- Matchday squads would be increased from the standard 22 to 23, with two props and one hooker required among the substitutes.
- If a team lost all of their available front-row substitutes, uncontested scrums would take place, but with that team having to play with 14 players instead of 15, eliminating any possible advantage of uncontested scrums.

In the last season before the trial (2006–07), 145 matches in the country's three top divisions (Top 14, Pro D2, and Fédérale 1) ended with uncontested scrums. In 2007–08, only two matches out of 994 in the same divisions finished with uncontested scrums.

In July 2009, the IRB authorised all of its member unions to adopt these changes in competitions that they completely control, and also allowed these changes in transnational club and provincial competitions (such as the Magners League and Super 14) with the permission of all unions involved.

=== More recent scrum law changes ===
In March 2013, former England hooker Brian Moore wrote a scathing article on the BBC website about the state of scrums, in which he outlined his concerns that the rule changes had made things worse instead of better.

Starting with the 2012–13 rugby season, the IRB issued trial law amendments, one of which affected the call sequence. The referee continued to start with "crouch" and "touch," but then issued the command "set," which replaced "engage" as the indication that the packs may push forward. "Pause" was removed in order to speed up the scrum and to minimize resets due to collapsed scrums.

As of the 2013–14 rugby season, the calls were changed to crouch, bind and set. This change required the props to bind before the pack is allowed to push, reducing the impact between the two packs when they engage. The IRB stated that this change was expected to reduce the impact "by up to 25 per cent in elite competition." In addition to changes in how the scrum is set, the IRB asked referees to renew their focus on the existing law, particularly preventing pushes before the ball is in and ensuring that the ball is fed in straight.

More recently, World Rugby announced that starting in 2017–18, it would conduct a worldwide trial of changes to the scrum law as part of a larger trial of law changes. These changes will be used for at least a year before WR decides on whether to make them permanent.

- The scrum-half must still throw the ball in straight, but is allowed to align his or her shoulder on the middle line of the scrum. This will allow the scrum-half to stand on his or her own side of the middle line.
- Once the ball touches the ground, any front-row player—not just the hookers—may contest possession.
- The number 8 may pick the ball up once it reaches the feet of the second-row players.

== See also ==
- Line-out
- Playing rugby union
- Rugby union positions

== Bibliography ==
- Verdon, Paul (2000). Born to Lead: The Untold Story of the All Black Test Captains. Auckland, New Zealand: Celebrity Books. ISBN 1-877252-05-0.
