= Billy Sendin =

South African rugby union player

- Full name: William Daniel Sendin
- Born: 4 October 1896 Kimberley, South Africa
- Died: 16 July 1977 (aged 80)
- Height: 1.69 m (5 ft 7 in)
- Weight: 52.2 kg (115 lb)

Rugby union career
- Position: Centre
Provincial / State sides
Years	Team	Apps	(Points)
- Griqualand West
International career
Years	Team	Apps	(Points)
1921	South Africa	1	(3)

William Daniel Sendin (4 October 1896 – 16 July 1977) was a South African international rugby union player.

Born in Kimberley, Sendin was an exceptionally light centre three–quarter, weighing a little over 50 kg. He was an elusive player who possessed a good side–step. A Griqualand West representative, Sendin featured for the Springboks on their 1921 tour of Australia and New Zealand. He played the second Test match against the All Blacks at Eden Park as an outside centre and scored his team's only try in a 9–5 win.

Sendon also competed as a lightweight boxer.

== See also ==
- List of South Africa national rugby union players
