= Flanker (rugby union) =

Playing position in rugby union

In the rugby union scrum formation, the flankers (numbered 6 and 7) are located on the 'flanks' of the two forward packs.

Flanker is a position in the sport of rugby union. Each team of 15 players includes two flankers, who play in the forwards, and are generally classified as either blindside or openside flankers, numbers 6 and 7 respectively. The name comes from their position in a scrum in which they 'flank' each set of forwards. They compete for the ball – most commonly in rucks and mauls. Flankers also assist in pushing in a scrum, but are expected to detach from the scrum as soon as the ball is out to get to the play before the opposition's forwards. Flankers also participate in line-outs, either being lifted to contest or win possession, or to lift other players. Flankers are usually the key participants in the tackling process. The flankers, especially the openside, are often the fastest forwards on the team but still relied upon for tackling.

== Naming ==
Flankers can be known by several different names. Historically, they were often called wing-forwards, although this name had a more specific meaning in New Zealand when they used a now-archaic scrum formation. This term is rarely used any more, but the terms breakaway, flank, and flank forward are sometimes used. Collectively, the flankers and the number eight can also be known as the back-row forwards – referring to their scrum positions – or as loose forwards because they are loosely bound to the scrum.

== Role ==
Flankers are the position where the player should have all-round attributes: speed, strength, fitness, tackling and handling skills. Flankers are always involved in the game, as they are the players most commonly involved in winning the ball in open play, especially the openside flanker. Blindside flankers tend to be bigger, but not as fast as their partners on the openside.

In open play, flankers will often stand behind the backs, supporting them. If any ball is dropped by the backs, the flankers' job is to clear up messy ball and start a new phase of play. Because they are always close to the ball, they are often first to the breakdown.

Flankers do less pushing in the scrum than the tight five, but need to be fast as their task is to break quickly and cover the opposing half-backs if the opponents win the scrum. At one time, flankers were allowed to break away from the scrum with the ball but this is no longer allowed and they must remain bound to the scrum until the ball is out. Flankers also have to defend at the back of the scrum if the opposition wins the ball and the opposing number 8 decides to pick and go (i.e. pick up the ball from the back of the scrum and drive forward with it).

New Zealand openside flanker Richie McCaw, who was nominated for World Rugby Player of the Year a record eight times from 2002 to 2012, described three key roles for the flanker:

- "My main role as a flanker is, defensively, to tie in with the back line to ensure that the defence works well.
- On attack I think my primary role at first phase is to look after our ball. You attack the back line and I'm usually the first person there to make sure we secure that ball.
- Thirdly I put pressure on break downs and make sure I disturb their ball and try to turn their ball over."

=== Openside and blindside ===
The two flankers do not usually bind to the scrum in a fixed position. Instead, the openside (occasionally known as the strong side, traditionally wearing number 7) flanker attaches to the scrum on whichever side is further from the nearer touchline, while the blind-side (occasionally known as weak side or closed side, traditionally number 6) flanker attaches themselves to the scrum on the side closer to the touchline.

Since most of the back play is usually on the open side, where there is more space, it is usually the openside flanker's job to be the first to any breakdown of play and to get their hands on any loose ball (or to cause a breakdown by tackling the ball carrier or otherwise hurrying him into error). At a scrum where the ball has been won by the opposition, the openside flanker often has the best view of when the ball is out and is able to break away and close down the opposing ball-carrier, reducing the time available for a pass or kick. Openside flankers are often smaller and quicker than their blindside counterparts.

The blindside flanker has the job of stopping any move by the opponents on the blind (or 'narrow') side from a scrum. Blindside flankers are often responsible for cover defence from set pieces and may play a more physical role at the line-out, where they may well be used as a jumper. They can also be used for breaking their opposition line in open play using their speed and strength to break tackles.

Most countries prefer a quicker openside flanker with the ability to get off the scrum quickly so that he can scavenge for the ball. In South Africa, however, it is preferred for the blindside flanker to be quicker as it is often their duty to carry the ball, meaning they prefer the person running with the ball being quicker rather than the person trying steal it.

Flankers are not always assigned specific roles as opensides and blindsides. For example, Scotland flankers Finlay Calder and John Jeffrey played left and right, rather than open and blind. French teams tend not to make a distinction between the two roles, and their flankers also usually play left and right rather than open and blind: thus, Serge Betsen often wore the number 6 but would pack down on either the open or blind sides of the scrum, and will often harass the opposition fly-half in the manner of an openside; like Calder and Jeffrey for Scotland, Betsen and Olivier Magne formed an outstanding left-right partnership for France.

== See also ==
- Rugby union positions
- Scrum (rugby union)
- Playing rugby union
