= Charlie Meyer =

South African rugby union player

- Full name: Charles du Plessis Meyer
- Born: 14 January 1897 Harrismith, South Africa
- Died: 31 May 1980 (aged 83) Odendaalsrus, South Africa
- Height: 1.73 m (5 ft 8 in)
- Weight: 79.4 kg (175 lb)

Rugby union career
- Position: Utility back
Provincial / State sides
Years	Team	Apps	(Points)
- Western Province
- Orange Free State
International career
Years	Team	Apps	(Points)
1921	South Africa	3	(0)

Charles du Plessis Meyer (14 January 1897 – 31 May 1980) was a South African international rugby union player.

== Biography ==
Meyer was born in Harrismith and lived through the Second Boer War as a young child, during which he was held at the Howick concentration camp. He learned rugby at Hoogenhout High School in Bethal, captaining the school's XV for two seasons. While still a high school student, Meyer turned out with the local Bethal club, and afterwards joined Maties.

A utility back, Meyer got his early opportunities for Western Province as a wing three–quarter. It was in this role that Meyer made the Springboks 1921 tour of Australia and New Zealand, but ended up featuring in most backline positions, and missed only two fixtures. He scored two tries in one of their wins over the New South Wales Waratahs and played all three Test matches against the All Blacks, twice as a centre and once at fly–half.

Meyer later represented Orange Free State when he took over a farm near Ficksburg.

== See also ==
- List of South Africa national rugby union players
