= Nick du Plessis =

South African rugby union player

- Full name: Nicolaas Johannes du Plessis
- Born: 4 December 1894 Steynsburg, South Africa
- Died: 10 August 1949 (aged 54)
- Height: 1.82 m (6 ft 0 in)
- Weight: 90.7 kg (200 lb)

Rugby union career
- Position: Prop / Lock
Provincial / State sides
Years	Team	Apps	(Points)
- Western Transvaal
International career
Years	Team	Apps	(Points)
1921–24	South Africa	5	(0)

Nicolaas Johannes du Plessis (4 December 1894 – 10 August 1949) was a South African international rugby union player of the 1920s.

Born in Steynsburg, du Plessis learned his rugby at Paul Roos Gymnasium and was known by the nickname "Kake". He represented Western Transvaal and was capped five times for the Springboks, consisting of two Test match appearances against the All Blacks on their 1921 tour of New Zealand, then three home Test matches against the 1924 British Lions.

Outside of rugby, du Plessis was a teacher and served as principal of Klerksdorp High School.

His nephew, Felix, captained the Springboks, as did Felix's son Morné.

== See also ==
- List of South Africa national rugby union players
