= Theuns Kruger =

South African rugby union player

- Full name: Theunis Lodewicus Kruger
- Born: 17 June 1896 Steynsburg, South Africa
- Died: 6 July 1957 (aged 61)
- Height: 1.83 m (6 ft 0 in)
- Weight: 90.7 kg (200 lb)

Rugby union career
- Position: Hooker
Provincial / State sides
Years	Team	Apps	(Points)
- Transvaal
International career
Years	Team	Apps	(Points)
1921–28	South Africa	8	(0)

Theunis Lodewicus Kruger (17 June 1896 – 6 July 1957) was a South African international rugby union player.

Kruger was educated at Paul Roos Gymnasium and Paarl Boys' High School.

A highly mobile hooker, Kruger competed for the Springboks during the 1920s, attaining eight caps. His Springboks career consisted of two Test matches on a 1921 tour of New Zealand, four home Tests against the British Lions in 1924, then two appearances when the All Blacks visited South Africa in 1928. He also served as captain of Transvaal.

Kruger was the father in law of Springbok Ryk van Schoor.

== See also ==
- List of South Africa national rugby union players
