= Charles Kingstone =

New Zealand sportsman

Charles "Nipper" Kingstone
- Born: Charles Napoleon Kingstone; 2 July 1895 Auckland, New Zealand
- Died: 6 May 1960 (aged 64) New Plymouth, Taranaki, New Zealand

Rugby union career
- Position: Fullback
International career
Years	Team	Apps	(Points)
1921	New Zealand	3	(0)

Charles Napoleon "Nipper" Kingstone (2 July 1895 – 6 May 1960) was a New Zealand sportsman who played international rugby union for New Zealand. He was also a first-class cricketer.

Kingstone served as an artillery gunner in the New Zealand forces in World War I as "Napoleon Kingstone".

A fullback, Kingstone played all three of his Tests during South Africa's 1921 tour of New Zealand. He was injured in a motor accident in 1922 and didn't play again for New Zealand.

Kingstone played just one first-class cricket match. He captained a "Rest of New Zealand" team in a fixture against the national team at Basin Reserve in 1927. Despite coming in at 10 in the batting order, Kingstone scored 43, the second highest of the innings. He was his team's wicket-keeper but didn't claim any catches. He played non-first-class cricket for Taranaki in the 1920s, captaining them to victory in the Hawke Cup in December 1926.

He died in New Plymouth in May 1960, aged 64, leaving a widow, two sons and two daughters.
