= Boy Morkel =

South African rugby union player

- Born: William Herman Morkel; 2 January 1885 Somerset West, Cape Colony
- Died: 6 February 1955 (aged 70) Worcester, Cape Province. South Africa
- Height: 1.85 m (6 ft 1 in)
- Weight: 89 kg (196 lb)
- School: Hottentots Holland High School, Somerset West

Rugby union career
- Position: Forward
Amateur team(s)
Years	Team	Apps	(Points)
- Diggers RFC
- Somerset West RFC
Provincial / State sides
Years	Team	Apps	(Points)
1908–1914	Western Province		
- Transvaal
International career
Years	Team	Apps	(Points)
1910–1921	South Africa	9	(6)

William Herman "Boy" Morkel (2 January 1885 – 6 February 1955) was a South African rugby union player and 14th captain of the South Africa national rugby union team.

== Biography ==
Morkel was born in Somerset West, but he played for Diggers Rugby Club in Johannesburg at the start of his career before returning to the Cape in 1908, joining Somerset West Rugby Club. He made his debut for Western Province in 1908 and later became captain. He was the captain of Western Province when the team won the Currie Cup in 1914.

Morkel made his test debut for South Africa during the third test against the British Isles on 3 September 1910 at Newlands in Cape Town. He was then selected for Springboks on the tour to Europe of 1912–13. Alongside Morkel in the team were his cousins Dougie, and the brothers Jacky and Gerhard. After 1914 Morkel relocated to the Transvaal where he farmed in the district of Potchefstroom. While farming and only occasionally playing some rugby, he was recalled to join Theo Pienaar's 1921 touring team to New Zealand. He was then 35 years old and yet, after the injury suffered by Pienaar, he led the Springboks in all three tests against the All Blacks.

During his rugby career, Morkel played 9 Test matches for South Africa, scored two tries and also played 22 tour matches and scored five tries in the tour matches.

=== Test history ===
No.	Opponents	Results (SA 1st)	Position	Tries	Dates	Venue
1.	(United Kingdom) British Isles	21–5	Forward		3 Sep 1910	Newlands, Cape Town
2.	Scotland	16–0	Forward	1	23 Nov 1912	Inverleith, Edinburgh
3.	Ireland	38–0	Forward		30 Nov 1912	Lansdowne Road, Dublin
4.	Wales	3–0	Forward		14 Dec 1912	Cardiff Arms Park, Cardiff
5.	England	9–3	Forward		4 Jan 1913	Twickenham, London
6.	France	38–5	Forward	1	11 Jan 1913	Le Bouscat, Bordeaux
7.	New Zealand	5–13	Number 8 (c)		13 Aug 1921	Carisbrook, Dunedin
8.	New Zealand	9–5	Number 8 (c)		27 Aug 1921	Eden Park, Auckland
9.	New Zealand	0–0	Number 8 (c)		17 Sep 1921	Athletic Park, Wellington

== See also ==
- List of South Africa national rugby union players – Springbok no. 128

Sporting positions
Preceded by Theo Pienaar	Springbok Captain; 1921	Succeeded by PK Albertyn
