= Beethoven Algar =

- Born: 28 May 1894 Wellington, New Zealand
- Died: 28 November 1989 (aged 95) Levin, New Zealand

Rugby union career
- Position: Utility back
Provincial / State sides
Years	Team	Apps	(Points)
1914–15, 19–22	Wellington	31	
International career
Years	Team	Apps	(Points)
1920–21	New Zealand	6	(9)

Beethoven Algar (28 May 1894 – 28 November 1989), commonly known as Beet, was a New Zealand rugby union player. A back who played in any position from first five-eighth to wing, Algar represented Wellington at a provincial level, and was a member of the New Zealand national side, the All Blacks, in 1920 and 1921. He played six matches for the All Blacks, including one as captain, but did not appear in any internationals.

Following the death of Bill Francis in 1981, Algar was the oldest living All Black.

== Early life ==
Beethoven Algar was born on 28 May 1894 in Wellington, New Zealand, the son of Clara Doris (née Hoskin; 9 November 1860 – 5 April 1928) and Albert Eric Algar (1845 – 19 August 1909). Algar was the fourth of five children. Algar was named after German composer Ludwig van Beethoven by his musical mother. He also had an older brother Haydn, named after Austrian composer Joseph Haydn.

Algar’s family originally lived on Taranaki Street in Wellington until his parents separated in 1901. He moved with his father and siblings to the Wellington suburb of Worser Bay.

Prior to the outbreak of the First World War, he worked for his brother as a joinery apprentice in Kilbirnie. He also played club rugby for Poneke.

== Early rugby career ==
Algar made his debut for Wellington in 1914 as a 20 year old. He scored a try and a drop goal in their challenge of Taranaki for the Ranfurly Shield, which Wellington won 12–6. He continued to play for Wellington in 1915 before joining the Wellington Mounted Rifles in August 1915.

== Military service ==
On 13 November 1915 Algar departed New Zealand with the 8th Reinforcements heading for Egypt, arriving there on 18 December 1915. His responsibility in Egypt was to look after a number of the horses that were part of the New Zealand Expeditionary Force.

Seeking more action in the war effort, he transferred to the Imperial Camel Corps in July 1916. He also acted as a bodyguard and escort for T. E. Lawrence. He eventually reached the rank of sergeant with the Imperial Camel Corps. Algar fought in the Battle of Magdhaba on 23 December 1916 and the Battle of Rafa on 9 January 1917.

Algar then took part in three battles around Gaza, getting wounded in the buttock on 30 November 1917. He was evacuated to Cairo by camel, nine days before Jerusalem was captured. His wound became infected but he was able to avoid amputation. While recovering at Port Said rest camp he was declared no longer fit for active service, invalidating him home to New Zealand. He was discharged from the army on 27 November 1918.

== Return to New Zealand ==
After returning home, Algar worked with his brother running a building company in Kilbirnie. He also returned to playing rugby with Poneke and Wellington in 1919. He helped Wellington defend the Ranfurly Shield in 1919 and 1920 and was selected for the All Blacks for there 1920 tour of Australia.

Algar made his debut for New Zealand on 10 July 1920 in a pre-tour match against Auckland at Eden Park, which was drawn 11–11. Algar scored a try in the game. He also captained the All Blacks for his first and only time in their next game against a combined Manawatu-Horowhenua-Wanganui team, which New Zealand won 39–0.

Records
Preceded by Bill Francis	Oldest living All Black; 28 November 1981 – 28 November 1989	Succeeded by Wiremu Heke
