= Sarel Strauss =

South African rugby union player

- Full name: Sarel Stephanus François Strauss
- Born: 24 November 1891 Bloemfontein, Orange Free State, South Africa
- Died: 6 March 1946 (aged 54) Pretoria, Transvaal, South Africa
- Height: 1.80 m (5 ft 11 in)
- Weight: 80.7 kg (178 lb)
- School: Grey College

Rugby union career
- Position: Centre
Provincial / State sides
Years	Team	Apps	(Points)
- Griqualand West
International career
Years	Team	Apps	(Points)
1921	South Africa	1	(0)

Sarel Stephanus François Strauss (24 November 1891 – 6 March 1946) was a South African international rugby union player and first-class cricketer.

== Biography ==
Born in Bloemfontein, Strauss spent some of his early years in a concentration camp during the Second Boer War. He attended Grey College in his native Bloemfontein and was later involved in World War I operations in East Africa as a staff sergeant. Post war, Strauss represented Griqualand West in both provincial cricket and rugby union. He was a strong running centre on the rugby field and represented the Springboks on their 1921 tour, playing his sole Test match against the All Blacks in Wellington.

== See also ==
- List of South Africa national rugby union players
