= Royal Morkel =

South African rugby union player

- Full name: Johannes Albertus Morkel
- Born: 22 March 1894 Kimberley, South Africa
- Died: 22 October 1926 (aged 32) Somerset West, South Africa
- Height: 1.90 m (6 ft 3 in)
- Weight: 108.9 kg (240 lb)

Rugby union career
- Position: Lock
Provincial / State sides
Years	Team	Apps	(Points)
- Western Province
International career
Years	Team	Apps	(Points)
1921	South Africa	2	(0)

Johannes Albertus Morkel (22 March 1894 – 22 October 1926) was a South African international rugby union player.

Morkel was born in Kimberley and educated at Hottentots-Holland.

A giant sized lock forward, Morkel was one of five players with the same family name to represent the Springboks on their 1921 tour of Australia and New Zealand, all of whom were either his brothers or cousins. He was capped in two Test matches against the All Blacks, at Eden Park in Auckland at Athletic Park in Wellington.

Morkel died of appendicitis in 1926 at the age of 32.

== See also ==
- List of South Africa national rugby union players
