= William Fea =

NZ international rugby union & squash player and doctor

- Born: William Rognvald Fea; 5 October 1898 Dunedin, New Zealand
- Died: 27 December 1988 (aged 90) Hamilton, New Zealand
- Height: 1.73 m (5 ft 8 in)
- Weight: 78 kg (172 lb)
- School: Otago Boys' High School
- University: University of Otago
- Occupation: Medical practitioner

Rugby union career
- Position: First five-eighth
Provincial / State sides
Years	Team	Apps	(Points)
1920–1923	Otago		
International career
Years	Team	Apps	(Points)
1920–1922	NZ Universities		
1921	New Zealand	1	(0)

William Rognvald Fea (5 October 1898 – 27 December 1988) was a New Zealand rugby union and squash player, and doctor.

== Early life and family ==
Born in Dunedin on 5 October 1898, Fea was the son of David Miller Fea and his wife Jane Scott Fea (née Clark). He was educated at Otago Boys' High School, and studied medicine at the University of Otago, graduating MB ChB in 1925. He married Grace Flora Morrell Samuel in 1923. The couple went on to have three children.

== Military service ==
Towards the end of World War I, Fea was part of the New Zealand Expeditionary Force 40th Reinforcements, arriving in Britain in September 1918. After the end of the war, he toured Britain, France and South Africa with the New Zealand Army rugby team of 1919.

In World War II, Fea served between 1941 and 1944, including almost a year in the Solomons, as an officer with the 8th and 24th Field Ambulance, commanding the latter. He was transferred to the retired list in late 1944 with the rank of lieutenant colonel.

== Rugby union ==
A first five-eighth, Fea represented Otago at a provincial level between 1920 and 1923. He played one match for the New Zealand national side, the All Blacks, the third test against the touring South African side in 1921.

== Squash ==
Fea twice won the New Zealand squash championship, in 1936 and 1937.

== Death ==
Fea died in Hamilton on 27 December 1988, and was buried at Hamilton Park Cemetery.
