= Wiremu Heke =

- Born: Wiremu Rika Heke; 3 October 1894 Mangakahia, New Zealand
- Died: 30 November 1989 (aged 95) Rotorua, New Zealand
- Height: 1.85 m (6 ft 1 in)
- Weight: 90 kg (200 lb)

Rugby union career
- Position: Loose forward
Provincial / State sides
Years	Team	Apps	(Points)
1924–30	North Auckland	17	
International career
Years	Team	Apps	(Points)
1926–28	New Zealand Māori	48	
1929	New Zealand	3	(0)

Wiremu Rika Heke (3 October 1894 – 30 November 1989) was a New Zealand rugby union player. A loose forward, Heke represented North Auckland at a provincial level, and was a member of the New Zealand national side, the All Blacks, on their 1929 tour of Australia. He played six matches for the All Blacks including three internationals.

Following the death of Beethoven Algar two days before his own death, Heke briefly held the distinction of being the oldest living All Black.

Records
Preceded by Beethoven Algar	Oldest living All Black; 28–30 November 1989	Succeeded by Johnstone Richardson
