= Bill Zeller (rugby union) =

South African rugby union player

- Full name: William Charles Zeller
- Born: 18 July 1894 Umtata, South Africa
- Died: 27 July 1969 (aged 75)
- Height: 1.83 m (6 ft 0 in)
- Weight: 76.2 kg (168 lb)

Rugby union career
- Position: Wing three–quarter
Provincial / State sides
Years	Team	Apps	(Points)
- Natal
International career
Years	Team	Apps	(Points)
1921	South Africa	2	(0)

William Charles Zeller (18 July 1894 – 27 July 1969) was a South African international rugby union player.

A Natal three–quarter, Zeller was a member of the Springboks squad for their 1921 tour of Australia and New Zealand. He played two of the three Test matches against the All Blacks, which included a scoreless draw in Wellington. In that match, Zeller had one of the few scoring opportunities when he missed a shot from the mark. He notably scored an unprecedented three hat–tricks in other tour fixtures, helping the Springboks to wins over West Coast Buller, Otago and Auckland North. His four tries against the latter was the most ever scored by a Springbok in New Zealand.

Zeller's son Ron also represented Natal as a winger and was a Springboks triallist.

== See also ==
- List of South Africa national rugby union players
