= Gerhard Morkel =

South African rugby union player

- Full name: Pieter Gerhard Morkel
- Born: 15 October 1888 Somerset West, South Africa
- Died: 5 September 1963 (aged 74)
- Height: 1.82 m (6 ft 0 in)
- Weight: 80.7 kg (178 lb)

Rugby union career
- Position: Fullback
Provincial / State sides
Years	Team	Apps	(Points)
- Western Province
International career
Years	Team	Apps	(Points)
1912–21	South Africa	8	(16)

Pieter Gerhard Morkel (15 October 1888 – 5 September 1963) was a South African international rugby union player.

Morkel was born in Somerset West and educated at Hottentots Holland High School.

A Western Province fullback, Morkel gained his first Springboks call up for the 1912–13 tour of Europe and appeared in all five internationals. The Springboks didn't play again until a 1921 tour of Australia and New Zealand, with Morkel retaining his place at fullback. He suffered a dislocated elbow towards the end of the Australian leg, sidelining him for several weeks, but recovered in time to play in the entire Test series against the All Blacks. In the second Test at Eden Park, Morkel won the match for the Springboks with a second half drop goal.

Morkel was the elder brother of Springboks centre Jacky Morkel.

== See also ==
- List of South Africa national rugby union players
