= Richard Fogarty =

New Zealand international rugby union player

Dick Fogarty
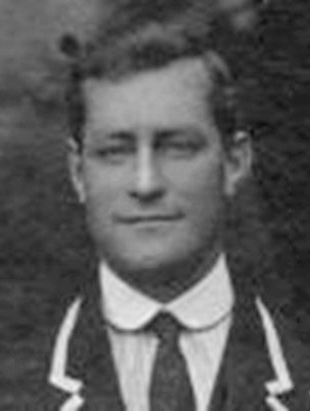
- Born: Richard Fogarty; 12 December 1891 Matakanui, New Zealand
- Died: 9 September 1980 (aged 88) Dunedin, New Zealand
- Height: 1.78 m (5 ft 10 in)
- Weight: 84 kg (185 lb)
- School: Christian Brothers School
- Occupation: Labourer

Rugby union career
- Position(s): Loose forward, hooker
Provincial / State sides
Years	Team	Apps	(Points)
1914	Otago		
1920–22	Taranaki	26	
1923–24	Auckland		
International career
Years	Team	Apps	(Points)
1921	New Zealand	2	(0)

Richard Fogarty MM (12 December 1891 – 9 September 1980) was a New Zealand rugby union player. He was a member of the All Blacks in 1914, playing in the loose forward and hooker positions.

== Early life ==
Born in the Central Otago gold-mining settlement of Matakanui, Fogarty was educated at Christian Brothers School in Dunedin, where he played rugby union.

== Senior rugby ==
Fogarty played for the Union club and represented Otago in 1914. He then played for the Hawera club and represented Taranaki from 1920 to 1922. He then shifted to Auckland, where he played for College Rifles RFC. He represented Auckland in 1923 and 1924. He was a New Zealand trialist in 1924 and played in the New Zealand Services team in 1918, 1919 and 1920.

== All Black ==
Fogarty was selected for the 1921 All Blacks. His two games for New Zealand were against the 1921 Springboks. He played in his usual position as a loose forward in the first test and as a hooker in the final test. The first test was won by New Zealand (13–5) and the second was a scoreless draw (0–0). Fogarty did not score any points for the All Blacks.

== Military service ==
During World War I, Fogarty served with the New Zealand Rifle Brigade, rising to the rank of sergeant. He was awarded the Military Medal for gallantry in 1918.

== Later life and death ==
Following the death of Frank Mitchinson in 1978, Fogarty was the oldest living All Black. He died in Dunedin in 1980 and was buried at Andersons Bay Cemetery.

Records
Preceded by Frank Mitchinson	Oldest living All Black; 27 March 1978 – 9 September 1980	Succeeded by Bill Francis
