= Bill Francis (rugby union) =

NZ international rugby union player (1894-1981)

- Born: William Charles Francis; 4 February 1894 New Plymouth, New Zealand
- Died: 28 November 1981 (aged 87) Pukekohe, New Zealand
- Height: 1.68 m (5 ft 6 in)
- Notable relative: Nelson Ball (cousin)

Rugby union career
- Position: Hooker
Provincial / State sides
Years	Team	Apps	(Points)
1913–15, 1921	Wellington	20	
International career
Years	Team	Apps	(Points)
1913–14	New Zealand	5	(6)

William Charles Francis (4 February 1894 – 28 November 1981) was a New Zealand rugby union player. A hooker, Francis represented Wellington at a provincial level, and was a member of the New Zealand national side, the All Blacks, in 1913 and 1914. He played 12 matches for the All Blacks including seven internationals.

Following the death of Richard Fogarty in 1980, Francis held the distinction of being the oldest living All Black.

Records
Preceded by Richard Fogarty	Oldest living All Black; 9 September 1980 – 28 November 1981	Succeeded by Beethoven Algar
