= George Aitken (rugby union) =

NZ & Scotland international rugby union player

- Born: George Gothard Aitken; 2 July 1898 Westport, New Zealand
- Died: 8 July 1952 (aged 54) Wellington, New Zealand
- Height: 1.75 m (5 ft 9 in)
- Weight: 78 kg (172 lb)
- School: Westport District High School
- University: Victoria University of Wellington; Oxford University

Rugby union career
- Position: Centre
Amateur team(s)
Years	Team	Apps	(Points)
1917-22	Victoria University		
1922-24	Oxford University		
1923	Leicester Tigers	1	
1922-25	Barbarians		
Provincial / State sides
Years	Team	Apps	(Points)
1914–15	Buller		
1917–22	Wellington		
1921	North Island		
International career
Years	Team	Apps	(Points)
1920	New Zealand Universities	4	
1921	New Zealand	2	(0)
1924–29	Scotland	8	(0)

George Gothard Aitken (2 July 1898 – 8 July 1952) was a rugby union footballer who represented New Zealand – known as the All Blacks – and then Scotland. He was born in Westport, New Zealand, and was selected to play provincially for Buller at the age of 16. After moving to Wellington, Aitken played for the province from 1917, and from there was selected for the All Blacks side that faced South Africa when they toured New Zealand in 1921. After only two Test matches for the All Blacks, both as captain, he was dropped from the team. In 1922 Aitken was awarded a Rhodes Scholarship and travelled to England to study at the University of Oxford. He played for the university's rugby club, and from there he was selected for Scotland. He first represented the country in 1924, and in 1925 appeared in all of their Five Nations matches; Scotland won all four of those games, and in doing so achieved their first ever Grand Slam.

== Early life and rugby career ==
Aitken was born in Westport in 1898, and was educated at Westport District High School. He played rugby at centre, and was selected for Buller as a 16-year-old – playing for them in 1914 and 1915. He moved to Wellington to attend Victoria University College (now Victoria University) where he played for the Victoria University club. In 1917 he was selected for the Wellington – that season representatives were restricted to players under military age due to the First World War. He continued to represent the province in the following seasons, and in 1919 Wellington resumed Ranfurly Shield matches; (Note: The Ranfurly Shield is a challenge trophy contested amongst New Zealand provincial rugby teams.) Wellington had won the Shield off Taranaki in 1914, but had not defended it at all due to the War. Aitken played in twelve Ranfurly Shield defences during his career.

Aitken continued to play for Wellington in 1920 – the province had a very strong team – when the side included a number of All Blacks. He was selected for New Zealand Universities when they faced the touring Sydney University team; Aitken played in both matches between the sides; the first was won 17–6 by New Zealand, and the second won 11–8 by Sydney University.

== All Blacks ==
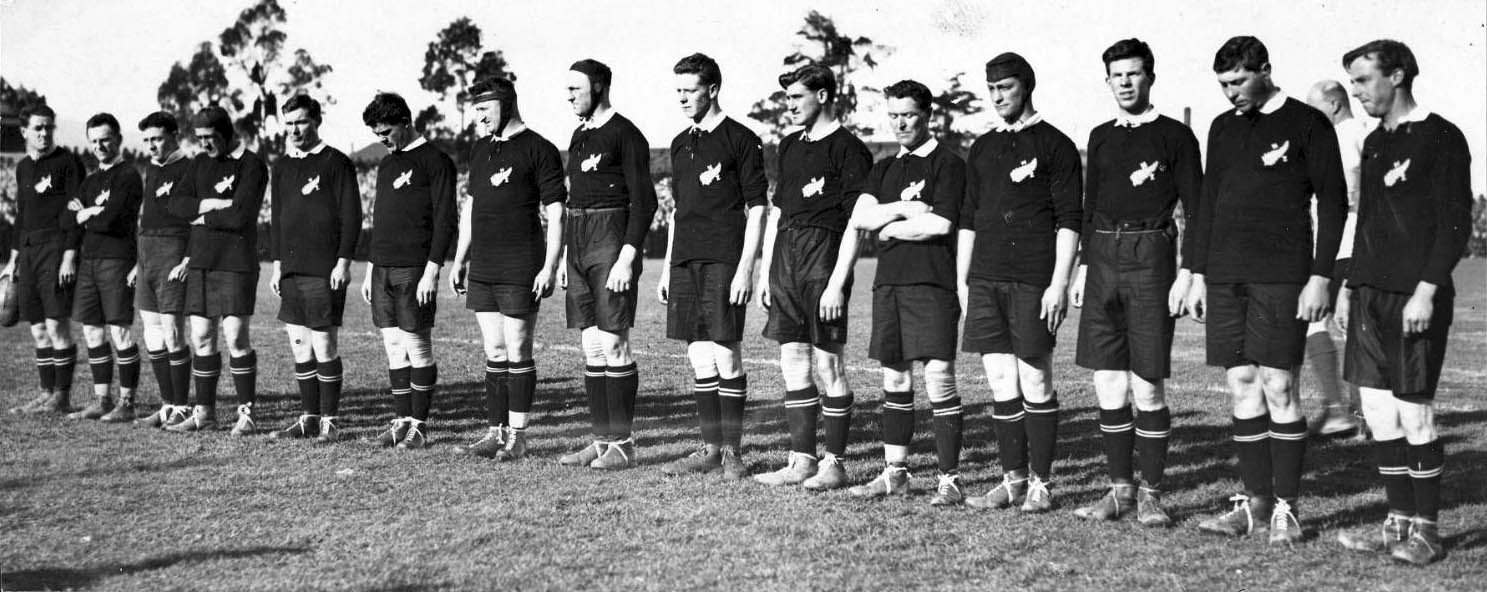
The 1921 All Blacks before playing South Africa – probably the first Test match in Dunedin. Aitken is standing on the far left.

The 1921 season was Aitken's most significant while in New Zealand. He was selected for the North Island side in the annual Inter-Island match, which was won by the North 28–13. For the second season he was selected for the New Zealand University team that played both Wellington and New South Wales. South Africa were touring New Zealand for the first time that year, and their itinerary included a three-Test series against the All Blacks. Aitken was selected at centre for the first Test match, and was surprisingly selected as captain, despite not having played for his country before, and never leading his province. He was described by rugby writer Winston McCarthy as "a beautiful mover of the ball who had the number one attribute of a good centre, to run his wings into position". The Test was at Carisbrook, Dunedin, in front of 25,000 spectators, and the game started well for the South Africans, who scored the first try, and led 5–0 at half-time. The New Zealanders responded with three tries in the second half to win 13–5.

The second Test was in Auckland; the All Black selectors made only three changes, and Aitken was again selected as captain and at centre. A crowd of 40,000 watched the two sides contest a close game; the scores were tied 5–5 until a late drop-goal from Springbok Gerhard Morkel (worth four points at the time), gave the South Africans a 9–5 victory. Aitken's form in the match was poor, however he had been ill with the flu leading up to the game. Consequently, for the third and deciding Test Aitken was dropped, and replaced as captain by Teddy Roberts, and at centre by Mark Nicholls. Aitken's dropping as a captain and a player was viewed as harsh, and he never played for New Zealand again, thereby becoming one of the few players to captain the All Blacks in every match they played. (Note: The deciding match of the series ended as a scoreless draw.)

== Scotland ==
The following year Aitken was awarded a Rhodes Scholarship to study at Oxford University in England. His last match in New Zealand was played on 9 August 1922. The match was a mid-week Ranfurly Shield challenge between Hawke's Bay and the holders Wellington. Aitken was in the strong Wellington side, who were expected to easily defeat the challengers. However Hawke's Bay upset Aitken's side 19–9, and went on to hold the Ranfurly Shield for five years.

After moving to England, Aitken played for Oxford Rugby Football Club, and was awarded a Blue for the University. He played one game for Leicester Tigers in 1923. He was eventually selected for Scotland, and played eight Tests for them between 1924 and 1929. The Scottish side included an all-Oxford University three-quarters; the other three were George MacPherson, Ian Smith, and Johnnie Wallace. In 1925 Scotland won their first ever Five Nations (now Six Nations) Grand Slam – victory over all four of their Five Nations opponents.

After graduating from Oxford, Aitken went into business in England. He later returned in New Zealand in 1939, where he worked for Department of Industries and Commerce. He died on 8 July 1952 in Wellington.

== Sources ==
=== Books ===
- Harding, Grant; Williams, David (2000). The Toughest of Them All: New Zealand and South Africa: The Struggle for Rugby Supremacy. Auckland, New Zealand: Penguin Books. ISBN 0-14-029577-1.
- McCarthy, Winston (1968). Haka! The All Blacks Story. London: Pelham Books.
- Swan, Arthur C.; Jackson, Gordon F. W. (1952). Wellington's Rugby History 1870 – 1950. Wellington, New Zealand: A. H. & A. W. Reed.
- Verdon, Paul (2000). Born to Lead: The Untold Story of The All Black Test Captains. Auckland, New Zealand: Celebrity Books. ISBN 1-877252-05-0.

=== Articles and web ===
- Ferrie, Kevin (3 September 2001). "Competition is severe among men in middle". Herald Scotland.
- "George Aitken". allblacks.com.
- "George Aitken New Zealand / Scotland". ESPN.
- MacDonald, Paul. "First Scottish Grand Slam". BBC.
