= Nelson Ball (rugby union) =

New Zealand rugby union player

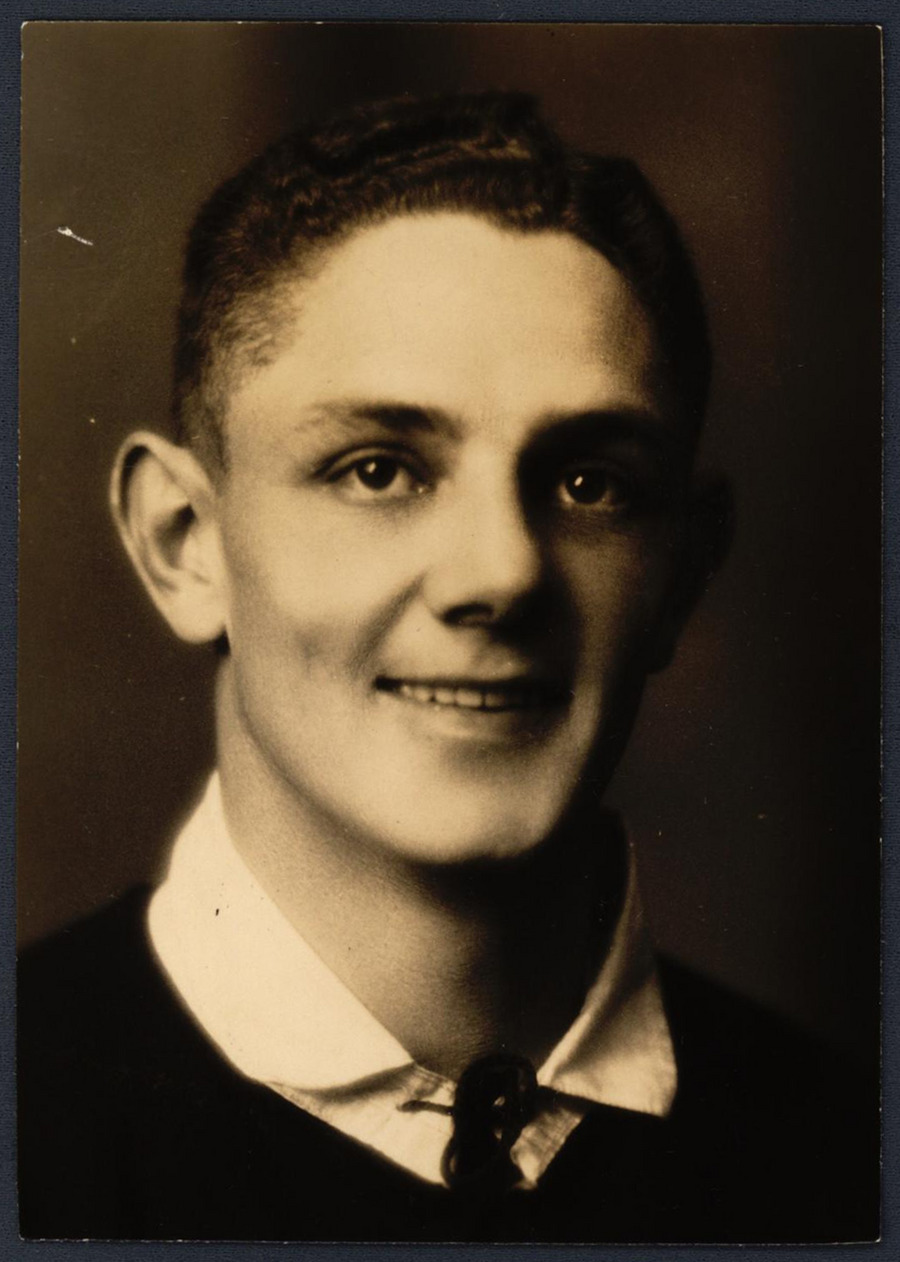
- Nelson in 1935
- Born: 11 October 1908 Foxton, New Zealand
- Died: 9 May 1986 (aged 77) Durban, South Africa
- Height: 1.75 m (5 ft 9 in)
- Weight: 68 kg (150 lb)
- School: Feilding Agricultural High School
- Notable relative(s): Murray Ball (son); Bill Francis (cousin)

Rugby union career
- Position: Wing
Provincial / State sides
Years	Team	Apps	(Points)
1927–29	Wanganui		
1930–35	Wellington		
International career
Years	Team	Apps	(Points)
1931–36	New Zealand	5	(12)

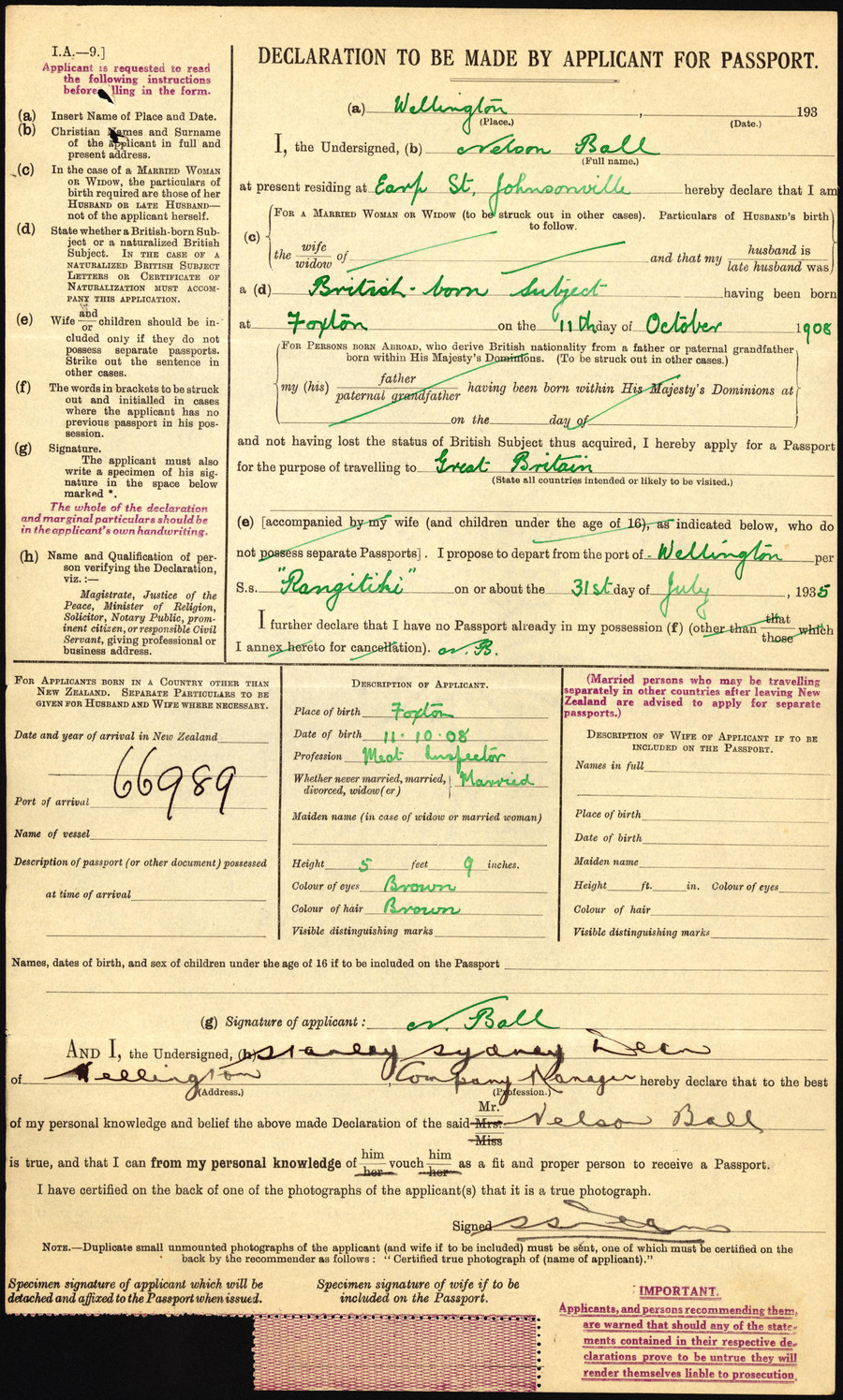
Nelson Ball passport application (1935)

Nelson "Kelly" Ball (11 October 1908 – 9 May 1986) was a New Zealand rugby union player. A wing, Ball represented Wanganui and Wellington at a provincial level, and was a member of the New Zealand national side, the All Blacks, from 1931 to 1936. He played 22 matches for the All Blacks including five internationals.

Ball moved to South Africa in 1948 and lived there for the rest of his life. He was the father of New Zealand cartoonist Murray Ball, and a first cousin of Bill Francis, who played for the All Blacks between 1913 and 1914.
