= Phil Mostert =

South African rugby union footballer

- Born: Phillippus Jacobus Mostert; 30 October 1898 Krugersdorp, South African Republic
- Died: 3 October 1972 (aged 73) Salisbury, Rhodesia
- Height: 1.83 m (6 ft 0 in)
- Weight: 88 kg (194 lb)
- School: Paul Roos Gym; Hottentots Holland High School
- Occupation(s): Accountant, AECI, Somerset West

Rugby union career
- Position: Prop
Amateur team(s)
Years	Team	Apps	(Points)
1918–34	Somerset West RFC		
Provincial / State sides
Years	Team	Apps	(Points)
1920–29	Western Province		
International career
Years	Team	Apps	(Points)
1921–33	South Africa	14	(6)

Phillippus Jacobus Mostert (30 October 1898 – 3 October 1972) was a South African rugby union player and 16th captain of the South Africa national rugby union team. He predominantly played in the forwards as prop, but could also play lock.

== Early life ==
Mostert was born 30 October 1898 in Krugersdorp, South African Republic. His father joined the Boer forces to fight for South African independence, and was killed in the Battle of Colenso, Natal, during the Second Boer War (15 December 1899). Mostert, his mother (Anna Francina Mostert) and 7 siblings (Martha, Gerbrecht, Johanna, Catherina, Francois, Frederik and Willem) were forcibly removed from their razed family farm in Krugersdorp (2 May 1901) and carried off to an infamous British concentration camp and survived there until the end of the war (15 October 1902). After release from the concentration camp, Mostert and his family moved down to the Western Cape to live with his maternal aunt.

== Career ==
Mostert started playing rugby at the age of thirteen and joined Somerset West RFC, where he was selected for the first team in 1918. Later he captained the team for nine seasons in a row, from 1923 to 1931.

In 1920, Mostert was chosen for Western Province to play in the Currie Cup competition. He also competed in the Currie Cup competitions of 1925 and 1927, and during the 1927 competition he scored six tries and kicked a drop goal. In 1929 Mostert captained Western Province, which again won the Cup.

Mostert debuted for the Springboks on 13 August 1921, against New Zealand in Dunedin. He played as tighthead prop in the first and second test matches and then moved to hooker for the third test. The second test series in which Mostert played was the 1924 test series against the touring team from the British Isles. During the second test in the series, he scored his first and only test try.

In 1928 New Zealand toured South Africa and Mostert was named captain of the Springboks. He played twice as a loosehead prop and twice as hooker in the test series which was shared 2 all by the teams. In 1931–32 Mostert toured with the Springboks to Britain and Ireland, playing last international match against Scotland at Murrayfield on 16 January 1932.

Overall Mostert played 14 international games, winning 10, losing 3 and drawing 1. He also played in 26 tour matches, scoring four tries.

After his playing days, Mostert coached and acted as selector in the Western Province and in 1965, he was elected an honorary life member of the Western Province RFU.

=== Test history ===
No.	Opponents	Results (SA 1st)	Position	Score	Dates	Venue
1.	New Zealand	5–13	Tighthead prop		13 Aug 1921	Carisbrook, Dunedin
2.	New Zealand	9–5	Tighthead prop		27 Aug 1921	Eden Park, Auckland
3.	New Zealand	0–0	Hooker		17 Sep 1921	Athletic Park, Wellington
4.	(United Kingdom) British Isles	7–3	Tighthead prop		16 Aug 1924	Kingsmead, Durban
5.	(United Kingdom) British Isles	17–0	Tighthead prop	1 try	23 Aug 1924	Wanderers Stadium, Johannesburg
6.	(United Kingdom) British Isles	16–9	Lock		20 Sep 1924	Newlands, Cape Town
7.	New Zealand	17–0	Loosehead prop (c)		30 Jun 1928	Kingsmead, Durban
8.	New Zealand	6–7	Loosehead prop (c)	1 penalty	21 Jul 1928	Ellis Park, Johannesburg
9.	New Zealand	11–6	Hooker (c)		18 Aug 1928	Crusaders Ground, Port Elizabeth
10.	New Zealand	5–13	Hooker (c)		1 Sep 1928	Newlands, Cape Town
11.	Wales	8–3	Tighthead prop		5 Dec 1931	St. Helen's, Swansea
12.	Ireland	8–3	Tighthead prop		19 Dec 1931	Lansdowne Road, Dublin
13.	England	7–0	Tighthead prop		2 Jan 1932	Twickenham, London
14.	Scotland	6–3	Tighthead prop		16 Jan 1932	Murrayfield, Edinburgh

== See also ==
- List of South Africa national rugby union players – Springbok no. 176

Sporting positions
Preceded by PK Albertyn	Springbok Captain; 1928	Succeeded by Bennie Osler
