= Johnstone Richardson =

Jock Richardson
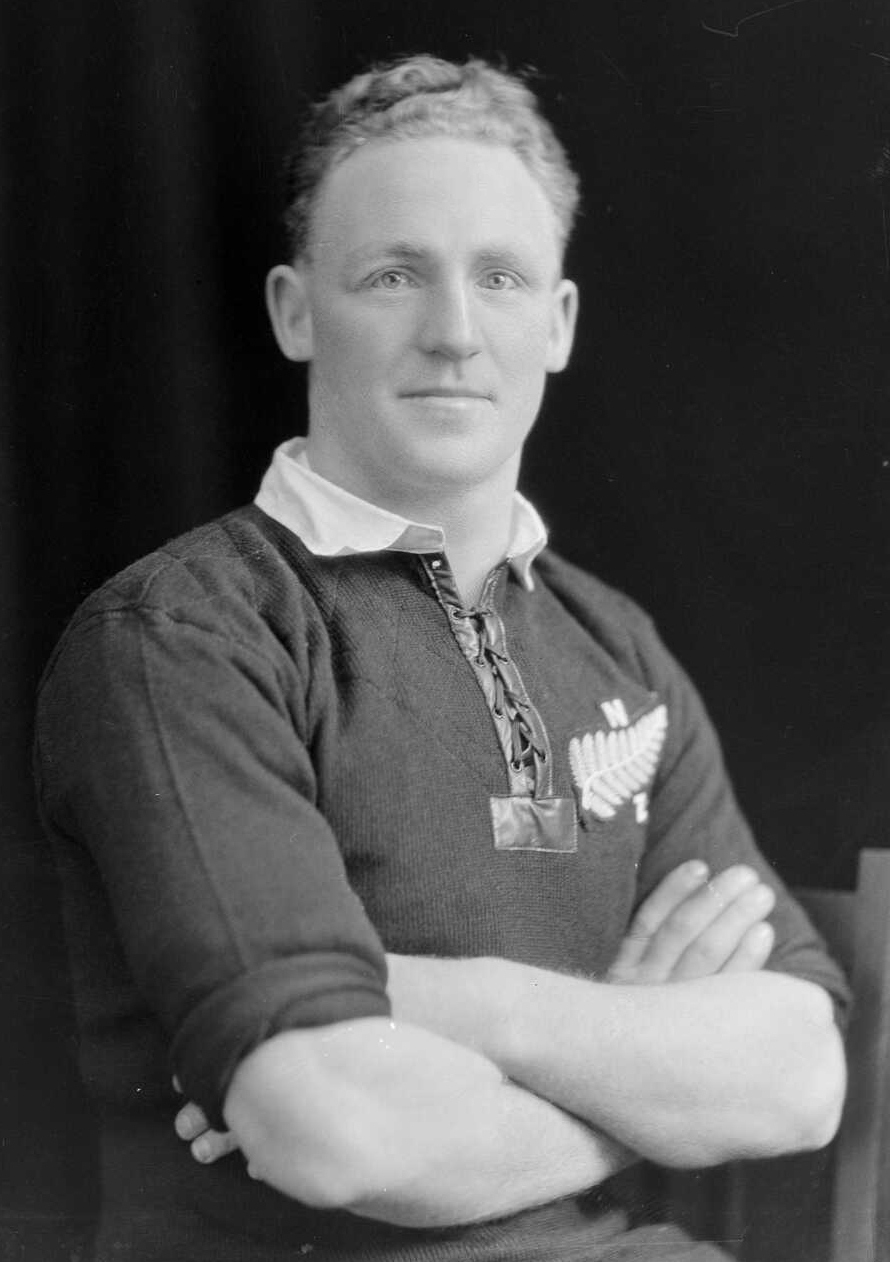
- Richardson in 1924
- Born: Johnstone Richardson; 2 April 1899 Dunedin, New Zealand
- Died: 28 October 1994 (aged 95) Nowra, New South Wales, Australia
- Height: 1.85 m (6 ft 1 in)
- Weight: 93 kg (205 lb)

Rugby union career
- Position: Loose forward
Provincial / State sides
Years	Team	Apps	(Points)
1920–22	Otago	14	
1923–26	Southland	15	
International career
Years	Team	Apps	(Points)
1921–25	New Zealand	7	(3)

Johnstone "Jock" Richardson (2 April 1899 – 28 October 1994) was a New Zealand rugby union player. A loose forward, Richardson represented Otago and Southland at a provincial level, and was a member of the New Zealand national side, the All Blacks, from 1921 to 1925. He played 42 matches for the All Blacks, 16 of them as captain, including seven internationals.

Following the death of Wiremu Heke in 1989, Richardson was the oldest living All Black.

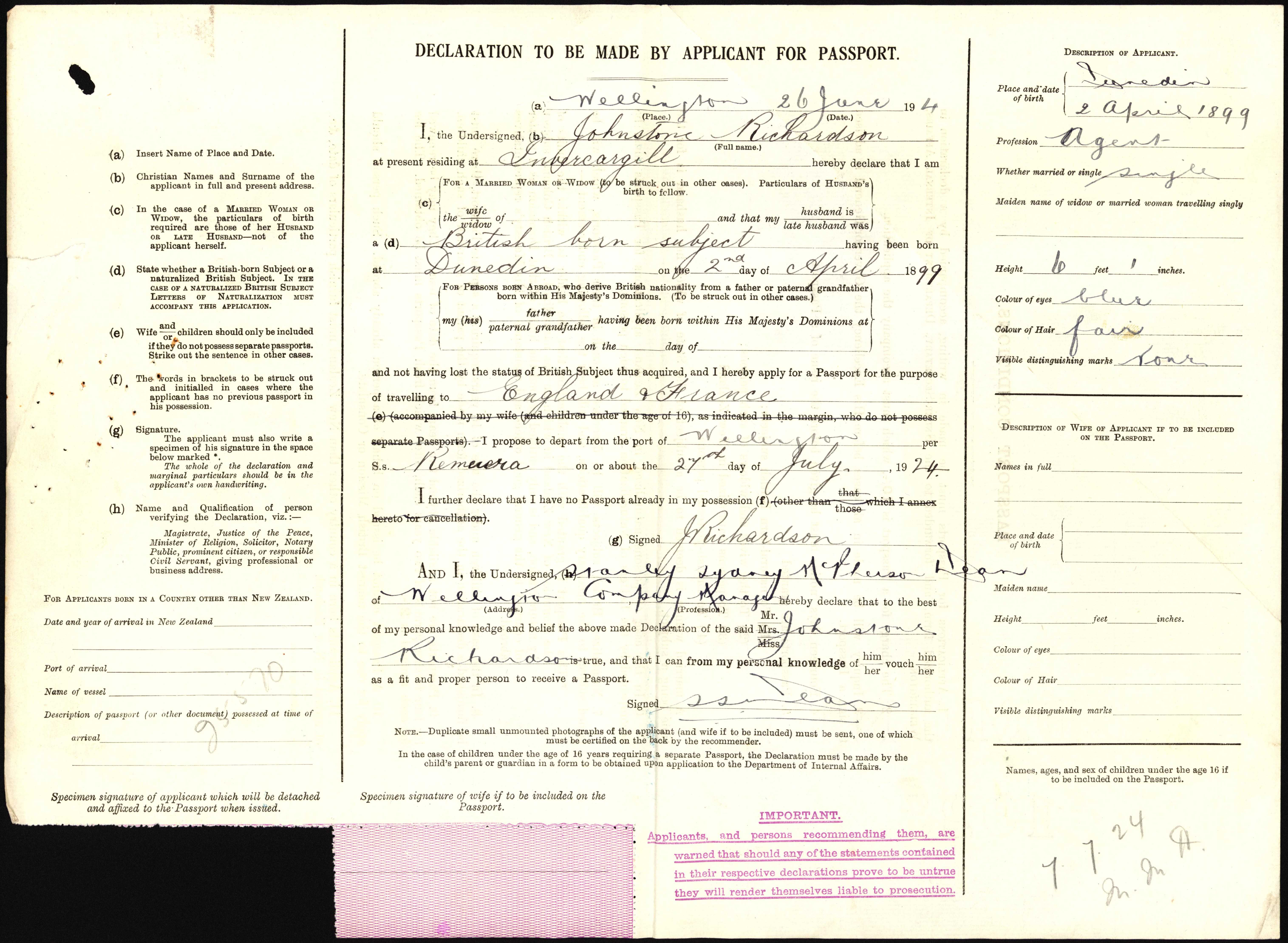
Johnstone Richardson passport application (1924)

Records
Preceded by Wiremu Heke	Oldest living All Black; 30 November 1989 – 28 October 1994	Succeeded by Phillippe Cabot
