= Mannetjies Michau =

South African rugby union player

- Full name: Johannes Petrus Michau
- Born: 6 October 1900 Cradock, South Africa
- Died: 22 May 1960 (aged 59)
- Height: 1.78 m (5 ft 10 in)
- Weight: 77.1 kg (170 lb)
- School: Cradock High School
- Occupation: Farmer

Rugby union career
- Position: Halfback
Provincial / State sides
Years	Team	Apps	(Points)
- Western Province
- Eastern Province
International career
Years	Team	Apps	(Points)
1921	South Africa	3	(0)

Johannes Petrus Michau (6 October 1900 – 22 May 1960) was a South African international rugby union player.

== Biography ==
Born in Cradock, Michau attended Victoria College, Stellenbosch, and played rugby for Maties under renowned coach Oubaas Mark, who developed him into a scrum–half. He first earned Western Province representative honours his second year with Maties in 1919 and also made the Combined Southern Universities side that year.

Michau was the youngest Springbok on their 1921 tour of Australia and New Zealand, during which he played 16 fixtures. This included three Test matches against the All Blacks. He made his debut in the less accustomed position of fly–half for the series opener at Carisbrook, then was scrum–half for the subsequent Test matches in Auckland and Wellington, partnering his Maties fly–half Sas de Kock in the latter.

By 1924, Michau had returned to Cradock and captained Eastern Province to a win over the touring British Lions.

== See also ==
- List of South Africa national rugby union players
