= Jack Steel =

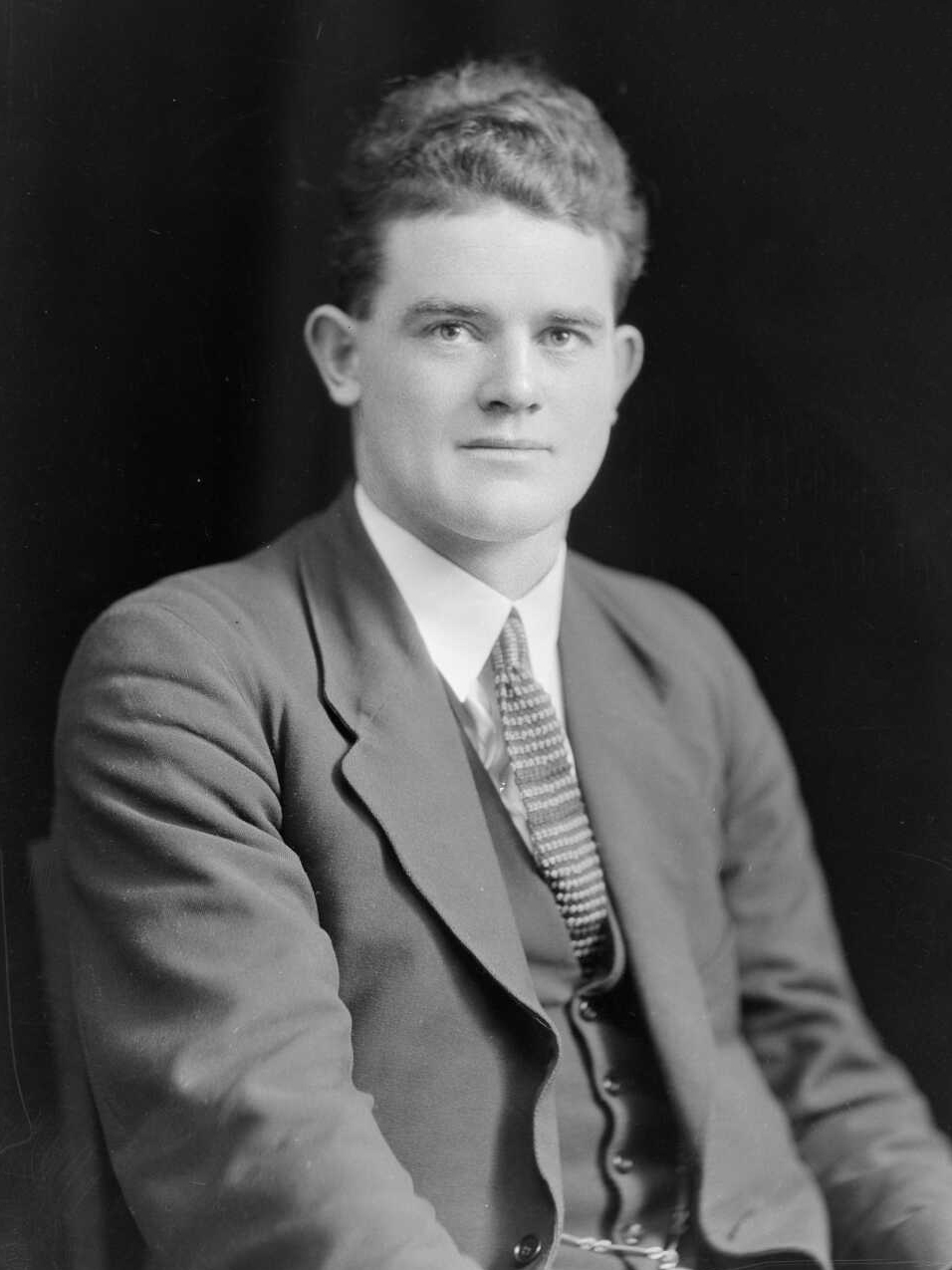
- Steel in 1924
- Born: John Steel; 10 November 1898 Dillmanstown, New Zealand
- Died: 4 August 1941 (aged 42) Greymouth, New Zealand
- Height: 1.78 m (5 ft 10 in)
- Weight: 85 kg (187 lb)
- Notable relative: Tony Steel (nephew)
- Occupation: Publican

Rugby union career
- Position: Wing
Provincial / State sides
Years	Team	Apps	(Points)
1919–26	West Coast		
1927–29	Canterbury	12	
International career
Years	Team	Apps	(Points)
1920–1925	New Zealand	6	(9)

John Steel (10 November 1898 – 4 August 1941) was a New Zealand rugby union player. A wing, Steel represented West Coast and Canterbury at a provincial level, and was a member of the New Zealand national side, the All Blacks, from 1920 to 1925. He played 38 matches for the All Blacks including six internationals, and captained the side on two occasions.

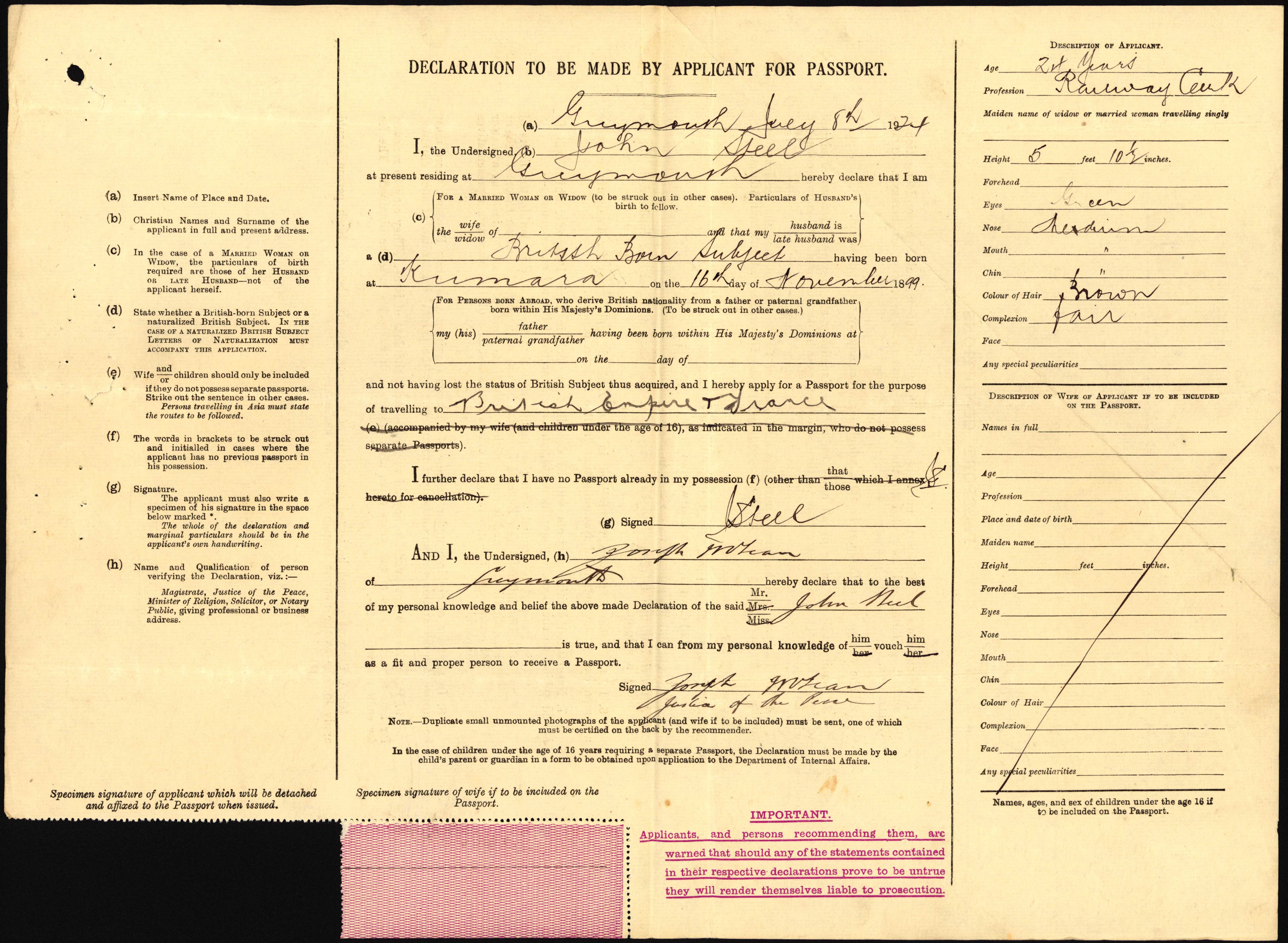
John Steel passport application file (1924)
