= Mervyn Ellis =

South African rugby union player

- Full name: Mervyn Centlivres Ellis
- Born: 16 October 1892
- Died: 24 March 1959 (aged 66)
- Height: 1.80 m (5 ft 11 in)
- Weight: 86.2 kg (190 lb)

Rugby union career
- Position: Flanker
Provincial / State sides
Years	Team	Apps	(Points)
- Transvaal
International career
Years	Team	Apps	(Points)
1921–24	South Africa	6	(0)

Mervyn Centlivres Ellis (16 October 1892 – 24 March 1959) was a South African international rugby union player.

Raised in Rondebosch, Ellis was educated at Marist Brothers Linmeyer.

Ellis, a versatile Transvaal forward, was known to utilise the dribble kick to good effect and possessed considerable pace off the mark, making him best suited as a loose forward. He gained six Springboks caps, beginning with two appearances on a 1921 tour of New Zealand, then four home Test matches against the 1924 British Lions.

== See also ==
- List of South Africa national rugby union players
