= Harry Morkel =

South Africa international rugby union player

- Born: Hendrik Johannes Louw Morkel; 8 December 1888 Kimberley, Cape Colony
- Died: 16 July 1956 (aged 67) Strand, South Africa

Rugby union career
- Position: Lock
Provincial / State sides
Years	Team	Apps	(Points)
- Western Province
- Correct as of 19 July 2010
International career
Years	Team	Apps	(Points)
1921	South Africa	1	(0)
- Correct as of 19 July 2010

Hendrik Johannes Louw "Harry" Morkel (8 December 1888 – 16 July 1956) was a South African international rugby union player. He was born in Kimberley and first played provincial rugby for Western Province. He made his only Test appearance for South Africa during their 1921 tour of New Zealand. He played as a lock for the 1st Test of the series, a 13–5 loss at Carisbrook. Morkel died in 1956, in Strand, at the age of 67.
