= Thrown In =

Thoroughbred racehorse

- Sire: Beau Bill
- Grandsire: William the Third
- Dam: La Vargo
- Damsire: Long Tom
- Sex: Gelding
- Foaled: 1916
- Country: United Kingdom
- Colour: Chestnut
- Owner: Hugh Grosvenor, 2nd Baron Stalbridge
- Trainer: Owen Anthony

Major wins
- Cheltenham Gold Cup (1927)

Thrown In (foaled 1916) was a British racehorse who won the 1927 Cheltenham Gold Cup. He won several other races but failed in two attempts at the Grand National.

== Background ==
Thrown In was a chestnut gelding bred in England. He was the only horse of any consequence sired by Beau Bill, a son of the Ascot Gold Cup winner William the Third. His dam Va Largo was a descendant of the successful broodmare Elf.

== Racing career ==
Thrown In was originally owned by Fred Gunt before being acquired by G. Sanday for whom he won seven races before being bought by Lord Stalbridge for £1000 in 1925. After being gelded he was sent to the stable of Owen Anthony who trained for Stalbridge at Pounds Farm at Eastbury in Berkshire. Anthony had been a successful amateur jockey before taking up training and winning the 1922 Grand National with Music Hall. Thrown In won a further seven races as well as finishing seventh in the 1926 Grand National. In the same year Stalbridge reportedly turned down an offer of 4000 guineas from America for the gelding.

In the fourth running of the Cheltenham Gold Cup on 9 March 1927 he was ridden by his owner's son Hugh Grosvenor, a relatively inexperienced amateur who was recovering from a broken collar bone. The favourite was Silvo, the winner of the Grand Steeplechase de Paris who started at odds of 13/8 ahead of Amberwave and the five-year-old Grakle with Thrown In starting a 10/1 outsider in an eight-runner field. After Amberwave fell early in the contest, the race was dominated by Thrown In, Grakle and Silvo before the favourite began to struggle two fences out. Thrown In outjumped Grakle at the final fence and drew away to win by two lengths. Just over two weeks after his win in the Gold Cup, Thrown In started 100/8 third favourite for the 1927 Grand National but fell early in the race.

Thrown In was sold again at the end of the 1927 season and was exported to Denmark. Hugh Grosvenor, who rode him to his greatest success, was killed in an air crash in January 1930.

== Assessment and honours ==
In their book, A Century of Champions, based on the Timeform rating system, John Randall and Tony Morris rated Thrown In a "poor" Gold Cup winner.

== Pedigree ==
Pedigree of Thrown In (GB), chestnut gelding, 1916
Sire Beau Bill (GB) 1911	William the Third (GB); 1898	St Simon	Galopin
Sire Beau Bill (GB) 1911	William the Third (GB); 1898	St Simon	St Angela
Sire Beau Bill (GB) 1911	William the Third (GB); 1898	Gravity	Wisdom
Sire Beau Bill (GB) 1911	William the Third (GB); 1898	Gravity	Enigma
Sire Beau Bill (GB) 1911	La Belle France (GB); 1904	Melton	Master Kildare
Sire Beau Bill (GB) 1911	La Belle France (GB); 1904	Melton	Violet Melrose
Sire Beau Bill (GB) 1911	La Belle France (GB); 1904	Silver Sea	Hermit
Sire Beau Bill (GB) 1911	La Belle France (GB); 1904	Silver Sea	Stray Shot
Dam Va Largo (GB) 1910	Long Tom (GB); 1899	Ladas	Hampton
Dam Va Largo (GB) 1910	Long Tom (GB); 1899	Ladas	Illuminata
Dam Va Largo (GB) 1910	Long Tom (GB); 1899	Fuse	Bend Or
Dam Va Largo (GB) 1910	Long Tom (GB); 1899	Fuse	Fusee
Dam Va Largo (GB) 1910	Bess Demdyke (GB); 1902	Sir Hugo	Wisdom
Dam Va Largo (GB) 1910	Bess Demdyke (GB); 1902	Sir Hugo	Manoeuvre
Dam Va Largo (GB) 1910	Bess Demdyke (GB); 1902	Elf	Galopin
Dam Va Largo (GB) 1910	Bess Demdyke (GB); 1902	Elf	Queen of the Meadows (Family 4-g)

- Thrown In was inbred 4 × 4 to Galopin and Wisdom, meaning that both of these stallion appears twice in the fourth generation of his pedigree.
