= Andrew White (rugby union) =

New Zealand rugby player (1894–1968)

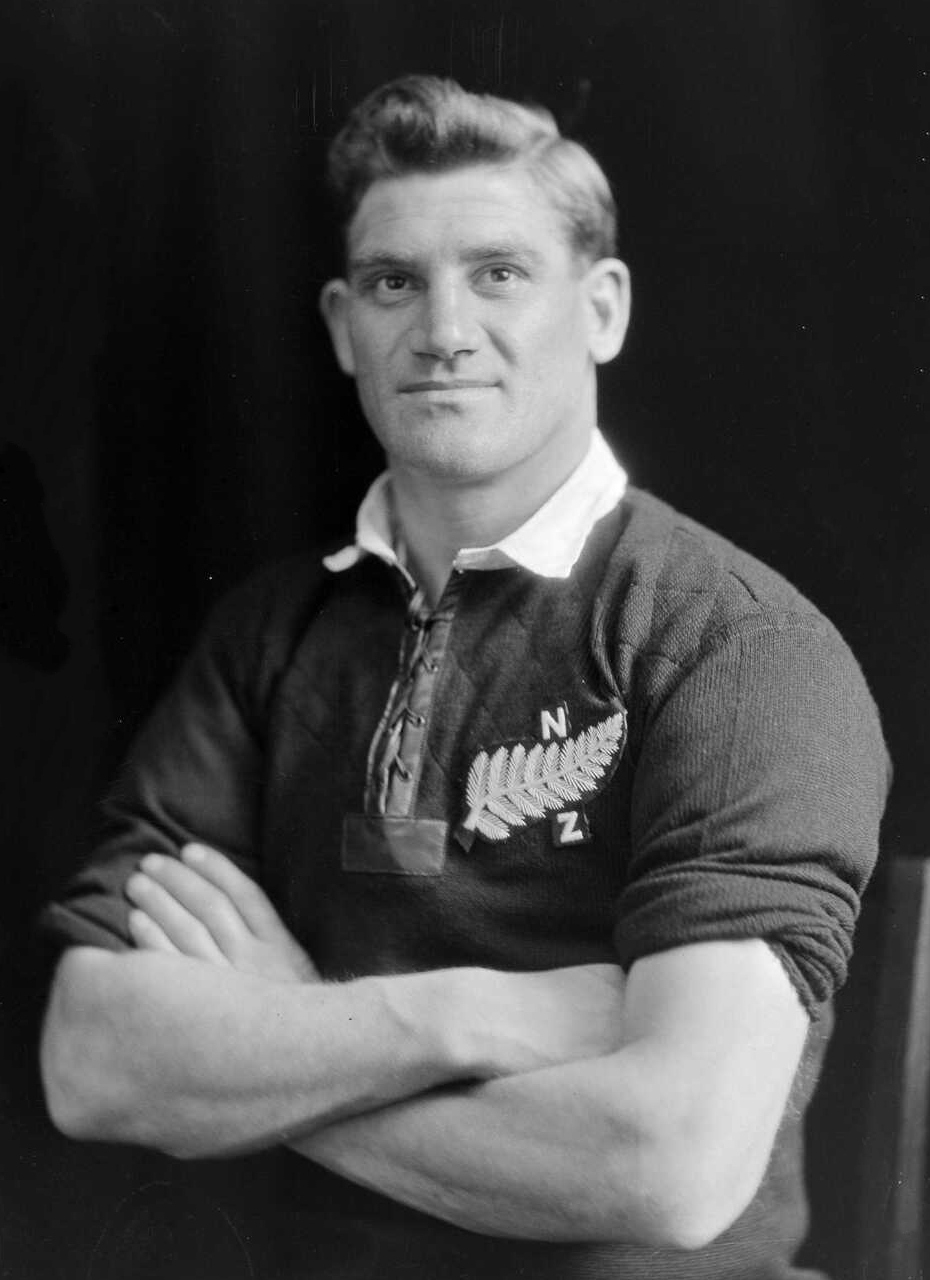
- White in 1924
- Born: 21 March 1894 Invercargill, New Zealand
- Died: 3 August 1968 (aged 74) Christchurch, New Zealand
- Height: 1.80 m (5 ft 11 in)
- Weight: 79 kg (174 lb)
- School: Southland Boys' High School

Rugby union career
- Position: Flanker
Provincial / State sides
Years	Team	Apps	(Points)
1919–24	Southland		
1927	Canterbury	4	
International career
Years	Team	Apps	(Points)
1921–25	New Zealand	4	(3)

Andrew White (21 March 1894 – 3 August 1968) was a New Zealand rugby union player. A flanker, White represented Southland and Canterbury at a provincial level, and was a member of the New Zealand national side, the All Blacks, from 1921 to 1925. He played 34 matches for the All Blacks—three as captain—including four internationals. In all he scored 48 points for the national side.

White died in Christchurch on 3 August 1968, and was buried at Waimairi Cemetery.

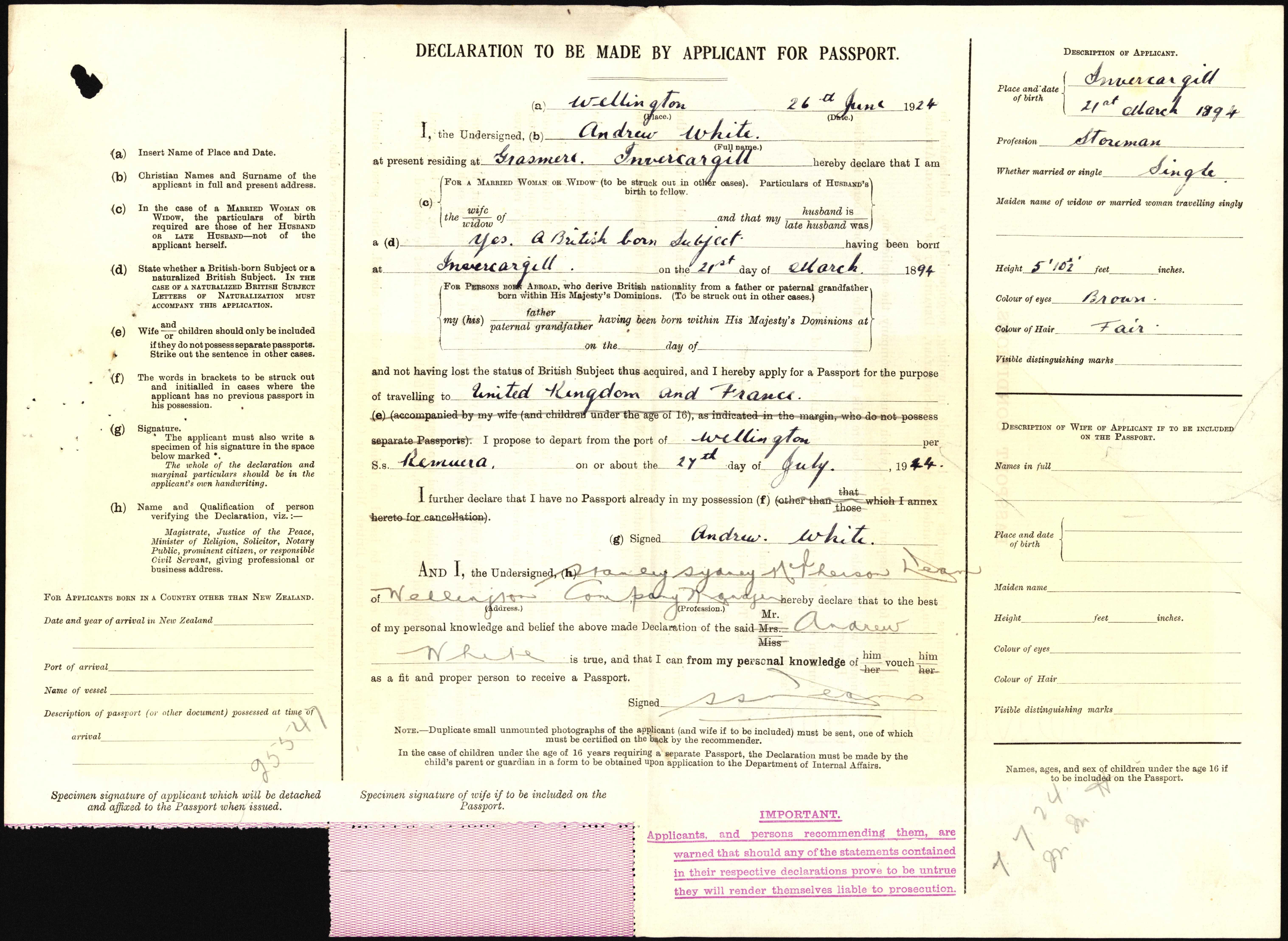
Andrew White passport application (1924)
