= Jim Moffitt =

New Zealand rugby union player

Jim Moffitt MM
- Born: James Edward Moffitt; 30 June 1887 Waikaia, New Zealand
- Died: 16 March 1964 (aged 76) Auckland, New Zealand
- Height: 1.80 m (5 ft 11 in)
- Weight: 95 kg (209 lb)
- Occupation: Hotelkeeper

Rugby union career
- Position: Lock
Provincial / State sides
Years	Team	Apps	(Points)
1910–1926	Wellington	42	
International career
Years	Team	Apps	(Points)
1920–1921	New Zealand	3	(0)

James Edward Moffitt MM (30 June 1887 – 16 March 1964) was a New Zealand rugby union player. A lock, Moffitt represented Wellington at a provincial level either side of World War I, and was a member of the New Zealand national side, the All Blacks, in 1920 and 1921. He played 12 matches for the All Blacks including three internationals.

During World War I, Moffitt served in the Auckland Infantry Regiment and rose to the rank of second lieutenant. In 1918, he was awarded the Military Medal for gallantry in the field. Moffitt was a member of the New Zealand Division rugby team in the Somme Cup tournament in France in 1917. Following the war, he was a member of the New Zealand Army team that won the King's Cup in 1919 against other British Empire teams, and then toured South Africa.

A hotelkeeper, Moffitt died in Auckland on 16 March 1964, and was buried at Waikumete Cemetery.
