= Cape Town Science Centre =

Science museum in Cape Town, South Africa

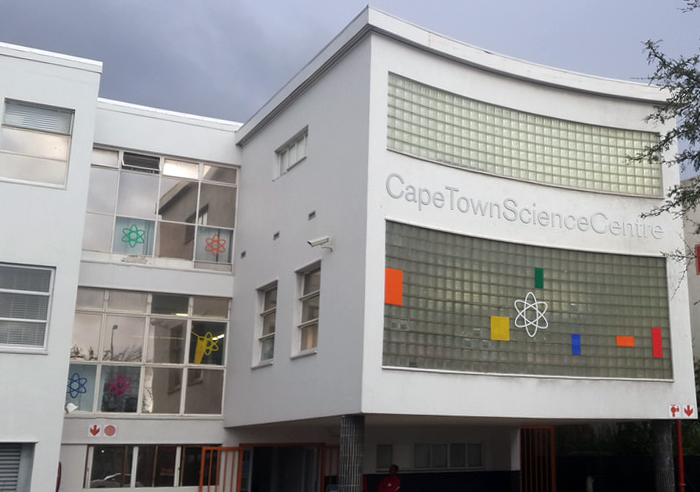
- Cape Town Science Centre, Main Rd, Observatory

- Location within Cape Town
- Established: 28 December 2011
- Location: Observatory, Cape Town
- Coordinates: 33.9383°S 18.4640°E
- Type: Science museum
- Director: Julie Cleverdon
- Website: ctsc.org.za

The Cape Town Science Centre is a not-for-profit science centre in Cape Town, South Africa. It forms part of a wide range of non-classroom initiatives to improve the quality of science understanding and science literacy in South Africa.

Until early 2010, the MTN Sciencentre was located in the Canal Walk shopping mall. It reopened in Observatory in 2011.

The MTN Sciencentre's Ericsson cell phone is in the Guinness Book of World Records as the world's largest working cell phone.
