= Baby Michau =

South African rugby union player

- Born: Jacobus Malan Michau; 14 August 1890 Cradock, Cape Colony
- Died: 20 June 1945 (aged 54) Boksburg, South Africa
- School: Cradock High School

Rugby union career
- Position: Lock
Provincial / State sides
Years	Team	Apps	(Points)
- Transvaal
- Correct as of 19 July 2010
International career
Years	Team	Apps	(Points)
1921	South Africa	1	(0)
- Correct as of 19 July 2010

Jacobus Malan "Baby" Michau (14 August 1890 – 20 June 1945) was a South African international rugby union player. Born in Cradock, he attended Cradock High School before playing provincial rugby for Transvaal. He made his only Test appearance for South Africa during their 1921 tour of New Zealand. He played as a lock for the 1st Test of the series, a 13–5 loss at Carisbrook. Michau died in 1945, in Boksburg, at the age of 54.
