= William Dow Duncan =

- Born: 11 June 1892 Port Chalmers
- Died: 14 December 1961 (aged 69)
- Height: 1.76 m (5 ft 9 in)
- Weight: 83 kg (183 lb)

Rugby union career
- Position: Hooker
International career
| Years | Team | Apps | (Points) |
| 1920–1921 | New Zealand | 11 | (3) |

William Dow Duncan (11 June 1892 – 14 December 1961) was a New Zealand rugby player. He played eleven games with the All Blacks.
