= Les McLean =

- Full name: Andrew Leslie McLean
- Born: 31 October 1898 Auckland, New Zealand
- Died: 18 January 1964 (aged 65) Auckland, New Zealand
- Height: 188 cm (6 ft 2 in)
- Weight: 89 kg (196 lb)
- School: Auckland Grammar School
- Occupation: Farmer

Rugby union career
- Position: Flanker / Fullback
Provincial / State sides
| Years | Team | Apps | (Points) |
- Bay of Plenty
International career
| Years | Team | Apps | (Points) |
| 1921 | New Zealand | 2 | (3) |

Andrew Leslie McLean (31 October 1898 — 18 January 1964) was a New Zealand international rugby union player.

McLean was born in Auckland and educated at Auckland Grammar School.

A Bay of Plenty farmer, McLean received limited opportunities to play provincial rugby. He won an All Blacks call up to play as a forward against the Springboks in 1921, after impressing with North Island. Missing the opening Test through injury, McLean debuted in the next international at Eden Park and scored his team's only try in a losing cause, before gaining a second cap in the final Test in Wellington. He made an uncapped appearance for the All Blacks against New South Wales in 1923 as a goal-kicking fullback, contributing 14 points off his boot, to join Jimmy Duncan and George Gillett in playing both forward and back for his country.

== See also ==
- List of New Zealand national rugby union players
