= Moke Belliss =

New Zealand rugby player

- Born: Ernest Arthur Belliss; 1 April 1894 Palmerston North, New Zealand
- Died: 22 April 1974 (aged 80) Taihape, New Zealand
- Height: 1.80 m (5 ft 11 in)
- Weight: 91 kg (201 lb)
- Notable relative: Peter Belliss (grandson)

Rugby union career
- Position(s): Wing forward Loose forward
Provincial / State sides
Years	Team	Apps	(Points)
1914–1931	Wanganui	44	
International career
Years	Team	Apps	(Points)
1920–23	New Zealand	3	(3)

Ernest Arthur "Moke" Belliss (1 April 1894 – 22 April 1974) was a New Zealand rugby union player. A wing forward and loose forward, Belliss represented Wanganui at a provincial level, and was a member of the New Zealand national side, the All Blacks, from 1920 to 1923. He played 17 matches for the All Blacks—six as captain—including three internationals.
