= 1927 Currie Cup =

Domestic rugby union competition

- Countries: South Africa
- Champions: Western Province (12th title)

The 1927 Currie Cup was the 15th edition of the Currie Cup, the premier domestic rugby union competition in South Africa.

The tournament was won by Western Province for the 12th time.

== See also ==
- Currie Cup
