= Jim Donald (rugby union) =

New Zealand rugby union player and farmer

James George Donald (4 June 1898 – 29 August 1981) was a New Zealand rugby union player and farmer. He was born at Tauwharenīkau, New Zealand.
