= August Frederick Markötter =

Oubaas Mark Markötter
- Born: August Frederick Markötter; 10 May 1878 Haarlem, Cape Colony
- Died: 16 April 1957 (aged 78) Stellenbosch, South Africa
- University: Stellenbosch University
- Occupation(s): Lawyer, University Registrar

Rugby union career
- Position: Fly-half
Amateur team(s)
Years	Team	Apps	(Points)
1893–97	Stellenbosch RFC		
1898–1900	Paarl Rugby Club		
1901	Villagers Rugby Club		
1902	Wellington Rugby Football Club		
1903–4	Stellenbosch RFC		
Provincial / State sides
Years	Team	Apps	(Points)
1903	Western Province Country XV		
Coaching career
- Years: Team
- 1903–57: Stellenbosch University

August Frederick 'Oubaas Mark' Markötter (1878–1957) was a South African rugby union player and national selector who coached Stellenbosch Rugby Football Club from 1903 to 1957. As coach he not only turned Maties into the world's largest rugby club but forged 50 of his players into Springboks and got nearly 150 of his players selected for the Western Province team. Eleven of the 1906 Springbok touring squad to Britain "had developed under him at Stellenbosch".

Markötter popularized the 3–4–1 scrumming formation which is now standard in rugby union, and thus created the position of eighthman as a loose forward. He has also been credited with entrenching the swing-pass among his players.

Markötter was "one of the most influential and significant personalities in South African rugby, which he dominated" between 1903 and 1957.

== Early life ==
August Frederick Markötter, better known as 'Oubaas Mark' or 'Mr Mark', was born on 10 June 1878 on the Berlin Missionary Society's Haarlem mission station, near Uniondale in the Western Cape, South Africa. He was the third son of missionary Christoph Heinrich Markötter (d.1893) and Mari Henriette (née Beuster, d.1932). His parents had immigrated separately from Germany to South Africa, where they had met and married. When August Frederick was 15, his father was killed in an accident with a horse-drawn carriage at Humansdorp, where he was buried. His mother remarried in 1896.

Young Markötter showed great promise as a student, succeeding with honours in schools at Haarlem and Uniondale, and under a Mr Stucki at Blouvlei. It is at Blouvlei that he received the nickname 'Oubaas', by which he would be known for the rest of his life.

== Rugby playing career ==
In April 1893 Markötter enrolled at Victoria College in Stellenbosch, where he took up rugby at the age of 16. He made his first appearance in the third team as a full-back against a side from Hamiltons. Assiduous practicing moved him into the second team, where he switched to fly-half. Proving to be "a hard and committed tackler" he made the first team in 1894, for which he continued to play until 1897. His teammates and friends included 1903 Springbok Japie Krige, with whom he would later open a lawyer's firm in Stellenbosch. Markötter was also a keen cricketer and tennis player.

After gaining his BA in 1898 he wrote in a letter, "I definitely decided to dedicate the rest of my life to rugby football". He accepted a position as teacher at Paarl Gimnasium for 9 months, and turned out for Paarl's rugby club. He began training as a lawyer, and moved to Cape Town, where he played for Villagers. After qualifying in 1901 at Cape Town, he opened his first practice at Wellington, where he continued his rugby career in the town team.

In 1903 Markötter moved to Stellenbosch as a partner in the firm Krige and Markötter. He captained the town team which went unbeaten that entire season. He was appointed captain of the Western Province Country XV which beat Mark Morrison's visiting British and Irish Lions team 13–7 at Newlands. This marked the first time that a Lions team had been defeated by a non-test side in South Africa. A severe knee injury that he sustained in a 1904 cricket match ended his career as rugby player. Subsequently, he turned to coaching, establishing a reputation for "uncompromising coaching methods".

== Legacy ==
Markötter adopted and adapted the 3–4–1 scrum formation that had been developed independently by Springboks Fairy Heatlie in 1901 while playing for Villagers and applied on the 1906 South African tour of Britain by fellow Villager Paddy Carolin. Markötter's contribution was to coach his players to wheel the formation after which the No. 8 would pick up the ball and break.

== See also ==
- Scrum (rugby union)
