= 1914 New Zealand rugby union tour of Australia =

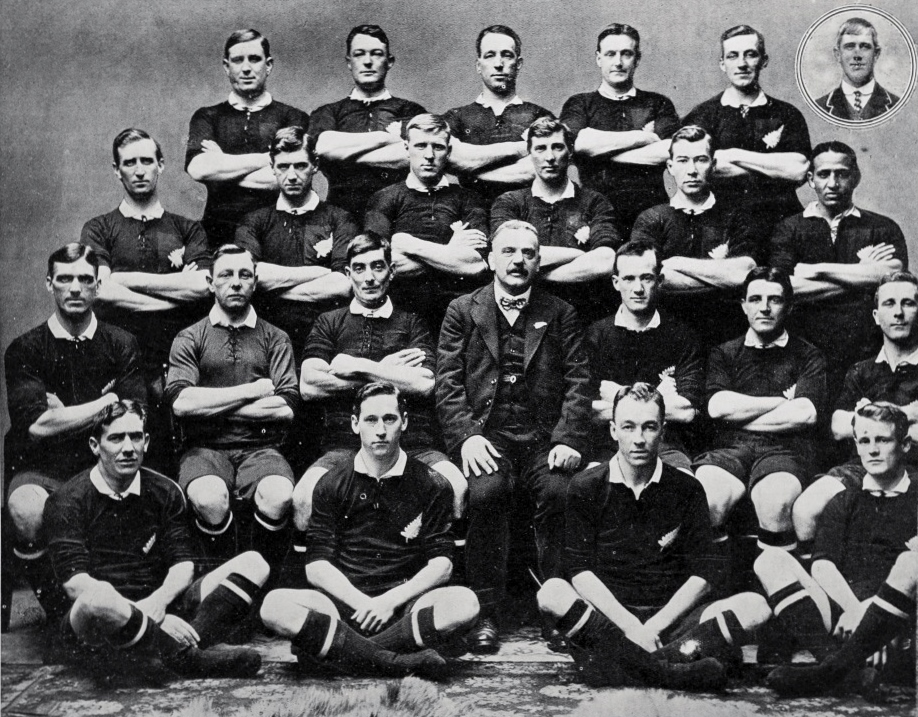
- All Blacks touring team
- Manager: R.M. Isaacs
- Tour captain: Dick Roberts
- Top point scorer: Tom Lynch (48)
- Top try scorer: Tom Lynch (16)
Summary
P	W	D	L
Total
11	10	0	1
Test match
3	3	0	0
Opponent
P	W	D	L
Australia
3	3	0	0

Tour chronology
- Previous tour: 1913 N.America
- Next tour: 1920 N.S.Wales

The 1914 New Zealand tour rugby to Australia was the eighth tour by the New Zealand national team to Australia. Seven matches were played against regional sides along with three Test match between the two national teams.

New Zealand won the test series v. Australia with three victories.

== Touring party ==
- Manager: R.M. Isaacs
- Captain: Dick Roberts

Name	Position	Province
Jack O'Brien	Fullback	Auckland
Eric Cockroft	Fullback, wing three-quarter	South Canterbury
Tom Lynch	Wing three-quarter	South Canterbury
Henry Morgan Taylor	Wing three-quarter, halfback	Canterbury
George Loveridge	Utility back	Taranaki
Dick Roberts	Wing three-quarter	Taranaki
James Ryan	Centre three-quarter	Wellington
Lyn Weston	First five-eighth	Auckland
Bobby Black	First five-eighth	Otago
Jock McKenzie	First five-eighth	Wellington, Auckland
Edward Roberts	Halfback	Wellington
James Barrett	Loose forward	Auckland
Alex Bruce	Loose forward	Auckland
Tom Fisher	Loose forward	Buller
James Graham	Loose forward	Otago
Ranji Wilson	Loose forward	Wellington
Toby Murray	Wing-forward	Canterbury
Jim McNeece	Forward	Southland
Albert Downing	Forward	Auckland
Sal Irvine	Lock	Otago
Bill Lindsay	Hooker	Southland
Bill Francis	Hooker	Wellington
Mick Cain	Hooker	Taranaki

== Match summary ==
Complete list of matches played by the All Blacks in Australia:

Test matches

#	Date	Rival	City	Venue	Score
1	1 Jul	Wellington RU	Wellington	Athletic Park	14–19
2	11 Jul	NSW Waratahs	Sydney	Sports Ground	27–6
3	15 Jul	Central–Western Districts	Orange	Wade Park	59–10
4	18 Jul	Australia	Sydney	Sports Ground	5–0
5	22 Jul	New England	Armidale	Showground	35–6
6	25 Jul	Queensland Reds	Brisbane	The Gabba	26–5
7	29 Jul	Queensland Reds	Brisbane	The Gabba	19–0
8	1 Aug	Australia	Brisbane	The Gabba	17–0
9	5 Aug	Metropolitan Union	Sydney	Sports Ground	11–6
10	8 Aug	NSW Waratahs	Sydney	Sports Ground	25–10
11	15 Aug	Australia	Sydney	Sports Ground	22–7

Balance
Pl	W	D	L	Ps	Pc
11	10	0	1	260	69
