= 1913 New Zealand rugby union tour of North America =

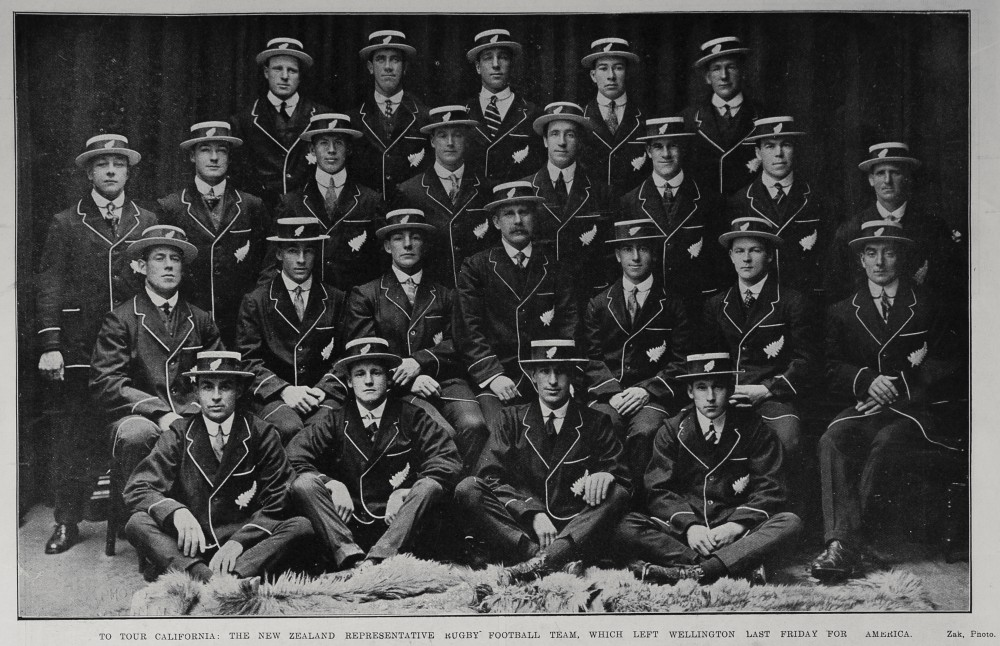
- The New Zealand team wearing blazers and hats, before their departure to North America
- Manager: G.H. Mason
- Tour captain: Alex McDonald
- Top point scorer: James Graham (66)
- Top try scorer: Tom Lynch (17)
Summary
P	W	D	L
Total
16	16	0	0
Test match
1	1	0	0
Opponent
P	W	D	L
United States
1	1	0	0

Tour chronology
- ← 1910 Australia 1914 Australia →

The 1913 New Zealand tour rugby of North America was the second tour by the New Zealand national rugby union outside Australasia. Sixteen matches were played (all won) along with a Test match against United States sides.

The tour had a relevance for American rugby because it came at a time when the local code, American football, was widely criticised prompted by worries over violent play, serious injuries and evidence of sharp practice by college coaches. That dispute, originated in 1906, had led some colleges (such as Stanford and California, Berkeley Universities) to switch from football to rugby. The All Blacks (which had toured in North America for the first time in 1905) had already made their contribution to the spread of the sport in the west coast.

New Zealand took the tour seriously, with a squad led by veteran player Alex McDonald that won all their matches in North America with large victories, conceding only 6 points in 16 games. The only test was played against the United States, which included players from Stanford and Berkeley.

Such hard defeats were a depressing result for the hosts, with the media emphasizing the skill difference between Californian players and the New Zealand side.

The Californian players are the best we have developed in seven years of intercollegiate rugby - the very best. And the score against them was 51 to 3. The only conclusion is that we have not yet learned how to play rugby. It is still a foreign game.

— The San Francisco Post after the match.

As a result, the University of California returned to football in 1915, although Stanford would remain in rugby. Several players competed in the national team in the 1920 and 1924 Olympic Games where the US won the gold medal on both occasions. However, the medals were only contested by 2-3 countries, with New Zealand absent.

== Squad ==
Name	Position	Province	Tour matches	Tour points
John Cuthill	Full-back	Otago	14	31
George Loveridge	Three-quarters	Taranaki	8	20
Tom Lynch	Wing	South Canterbury	11	50
Dougie McGregor	Wing	Auckland	10	45
Dick Roberts	Centre	Taranaki	12	60
Jack Stohr	Three-quarter	Taranaki	9	59
Doddy Gray	Five-eighth	Canterbury	11	9
Jock McKenzie	Five-eighth	Wellington	12	39
Frank Mitchinson	Five-eighths	Wellington	12	44
Teddy Roberts	Half-back	Wellington	5	18
Henry Taylor	Half-back	Canterbury	10	15
Harry Atkinson	Lock	West Coast	8	3
Alex Bruce	Loose forward	Auckland	2	3
Mick Cain	Hooker	Taranaki	14	11
Henry "Norkey" Dewar	Forward	Taranaki	14	3
James Douglas	Loose forward	Otago	8	21
Albert Downing	Lock	Auckland	14	18
James Graham	Loose forward	Otago	11	66
Alex McDonald (captain)	Loose forward	Otago	13	35
Toby Murray	Wing-forward	Canterbury	12	33
George Sellars	Hooker	Auckland	14	6
Peter Williams	Hooker	Otago	8	3
Jim Wylie	Loose forward	Auckland	11	18

== Match summary ==
Complete list of matches played by the All Blacks in North America:

Test matches

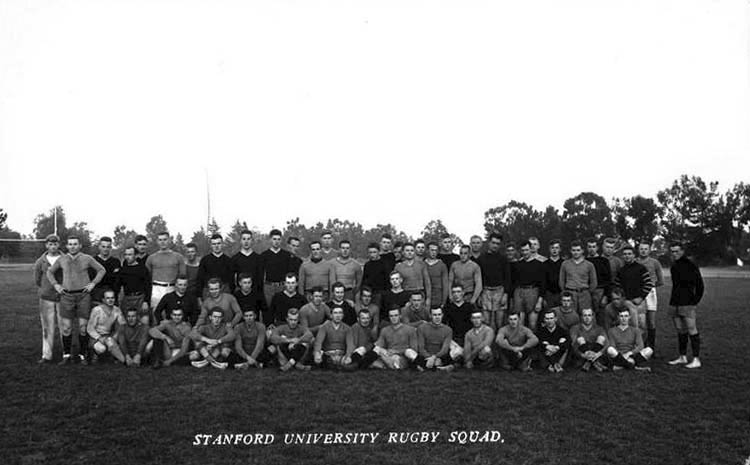
The Stanford University team that played the All Blacks

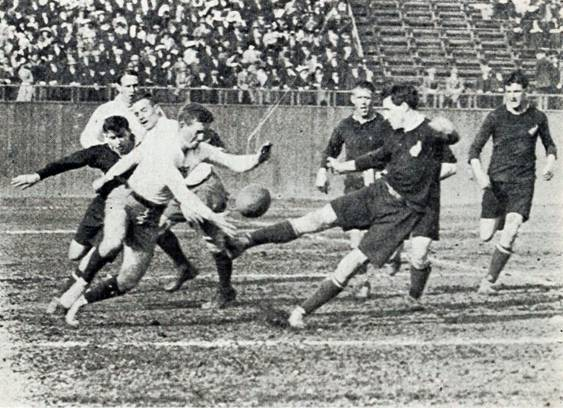
USA v All Blacks test

Rival	Date	Venue	City	Country	Score
Olympic Club	4 October	St Ignatius Field	San Francisco	United States	19–0
University of California	8 October	California Field	Berkeley	United States	31–0
Barbarians Club	11 October	St Ignatius Field	San Francisco	United States	30–0
Stanford University	15 October	Stanford Park	Palo Alto	United States	54–0
Stanford University	18 October	Stanford Park	Palo Alto	United States	56–0
University of Santa Clara	22 October	Golden Gate	Santa Clara	United States	42–0
University of California	25 October	California Field	Berkeley	United States	38–3
Univ. of Nevada, Reno	29 October	University Ground	Reno	United States	55–0
University of California	3 November	California Field	Berkeley	United States	33–0
St. Mary's College	5 November	St Ignatius Field	San Francisco	United States	26–0
Univ. of Southern California	8 November	Boyard Field	Los Angeles	United States	40–0
University of Santa Clara	12 November	Golden Gate	Santa Clara	United States	33–0
United States	15 November	California Field	Berkeley	United States	51–3
Victoria (B.C.)	19 November	Oak Bay Ground	Victoria	Canada	23–0
Victoria (B.C.)	22 November	Oak Bay Ground	Victoria	Canada	35–0
Vancouver	24 November	Stanley Park	Victoria	Canada	44–0

== Match details ==
15 November 1913

United States	3–51	New Zealand
Pen: Peart	Report	Try: Gray (2), McDonald (2), McGregor, McKenzie (2), Murray (2), Roberts (3), Wylie; Con: Graham (4), McDonald, Mitchinson

Attendance: 10,000
Referee: W.W. Hill (Australia)

Team details

United States	New Zealand

J.L. McKim	1	Mick Cain
E.B. Hall	2	G.M. Sellars
G. Glasscock	3	Jim Wylie
R.R. Blas	4	Albert Downing
G. Voight	5	James Graham
W.P. Darsie	6	Alex McDonald (c)
F.J. Gard (c)	7	Henry Dewar
W.N. King	8	Toby Murray
L. Cass	9	Henry M. Taylor
M.M. Mitchell	10	George D. Gray
J.C. Urban	11	Dougie McGregor
C.A. Austin	12	Jock McKenzie
D.B. Carroll	13	Edward Roberts
S.B. Peart	14	Frank Mitchinson
J.A. Ramage	15	John Cuthill

== See also ==
- 1906–1917 Stanford rugby teams
