= New Zealand Army rugby team of 1919 =

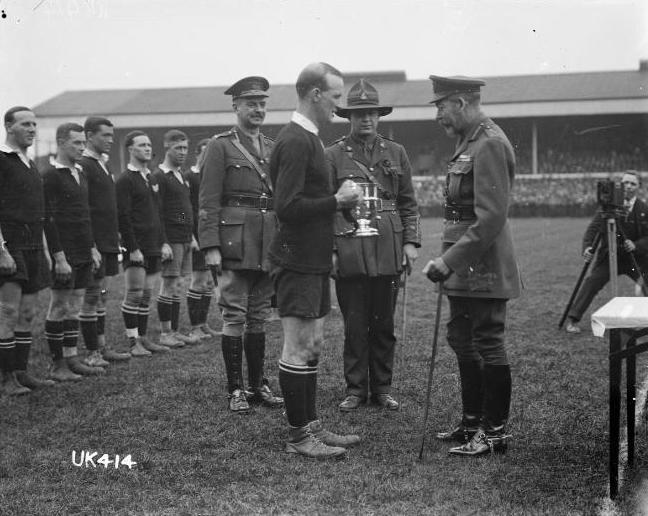
New Zealand captain James Ryan receiving the Kings Cup from George V

The New Zealand Army rugby team of 1919 was a rugby union team which represented New Zealand after the end of the First World War. Although spoken of as a single team, there were several New Zealand Services teams playing in Britain at the conclusion of the War. The most notable being the touring Army XV who played a series of games throughout Great Britain and France, including an internationally recognised match against the Wales national team. With the introduction of the King's Cup; a services tournament between forces from Australia, Britain, Canada, New Zealand and South Africa, the team split intself in two. The 'A' Team taking part in the King's Cup, while the 'B' team continued touring against club and county opponents.

== New Zealand Services ==
The First World War saw a high percentage of amateur rugby union players signing up to serve their country. At the same time the sport of rugby union was suspended at club and country level in most countries. The sport survived during this period through organised games conducted by inter-service and allied forces.

When the War came to an end, most international and club teams were decimated; more than a hundred internationals had died in the conflict (See:List of international rugby union players killed in action during the First World War), many more were seriously injured and other players were now too old or out of condition. Therefore, club teams took the possibility to play an organised New Zealand team as a way to challenge their own teams as they sought to rebuild.

Llanelli's first official game after the War was against the New Zealand Army team from the Larkhill Garrison in Wiltshire. This was followed by games against the New Zealand Machine Gun Corps on 22 February 1919. These and similar teams came together to make the New Zealand Army team. This team split into an 'A' and 'B' team when during a tour of Great Britain, an inter-services tournament, with a cup presented by King George V, was held between the allied forces. The stronger New Zealand Army 'A' team took the challenge of the King's Cup and eventually triumphed over the British Army at Twickenham. The 'B' team continued the tour of Great Britain and France.

== The tour of Great Britain and France ==
The tour of Great Britain and France took in 38 matches, of which the New Zealand Army won 33, drew two and lost just three games. With the tour over the Army team headed to South Africa for a further twelve matches.

== Touring party ==
Those players marked with ^{AB} were also capped as New Zealand 'All Black' rugby union internationals, either before or after playing in the New Zealand Army team.

=== Full-backs ===
- C. H. Capper (Field Artillery)
- John Gerald O'Brien (Divisional Signals)^{AB}

=== Three-quarters ===
- W. A. Ward (Rifle Brigade)
- Percival Wright Storey (Otago Infantry Regiment)^{AB}
- G. L. Owles (Field Artillery)
- Leonard "Jack" Stohr (Medical Corps)^{AB}
- Edmond "Eddie" Ryan (Field Artillery)^{AB}

=== Five-eighths ===
- Eric Arthur Cockroft (Canterbury Infantry Regiment)^{AB}
- Richard William Roberts (Rifle Brigade)^{AB}
- William Fea (Rifle Brigade)^{AB}
- James Ryan (Otago Infantry Regiment)^{AB}
- W. L. Henry (Canterbury Infantry Regiment)
- P. Tureia (Pioneers)
- G. J. McNaught (Machine Gun Corps)
- E. Watson (Wellington Infantry Regiment)
- G. Yardley (Auckland Infantry Regiment)

=== Half-backs ===
- Charlie Brown (Field Engineers)^{AB}
- D. McK. Sandman (Canterbury Infantry Regt.)

=== Forwards ===
- P. Allen (Wellington Infantry Regt.)
- J. Kissick (Field Engineers)
- F. P. Arnold (Auckland Infantry Regt.)
- A. A. Lucas (Field Artillery)
- Ernest Bellis (Otago Infantry Regt.)^{AB}
- Jim Moffitt (Auckland Infantry Regt.)^{AB}
- R. W. Bilkey (Field Artillery)
- Harold Vivian Murray (Machine Gun Corps)^{AB}
- Alex Bruce (Field Engineers)^{AB}
- E. J. Naylor (Otago Infantry Regt.)
- Michael Cain (NZ Rifle Brigade)^{AB}
- R. Sellars (Divisional Signals)
- Eric Cockroft (Field Artillery)^{AB}
- Arthur Singe (Auckland Infantry Regt.)
- James Douglas (Otago Infantry Regt.)^{AB}
- S. J. Standen (Field Artillery)
- Dick Fogarty (Rifle Brigade)^{AB}
- C. W. Tepene (Otago Infantry Regt.)
- A. Gilchrist (Field Artillery)
- Alfred West (Field Artillery)^{AB}
- Edward Hasell (Field Artillery)^{AB}
- H. G. Whittington (Rifle Brigade)
- Ranji Wilson (Rifle Brigade)^{AB}

== Results ==
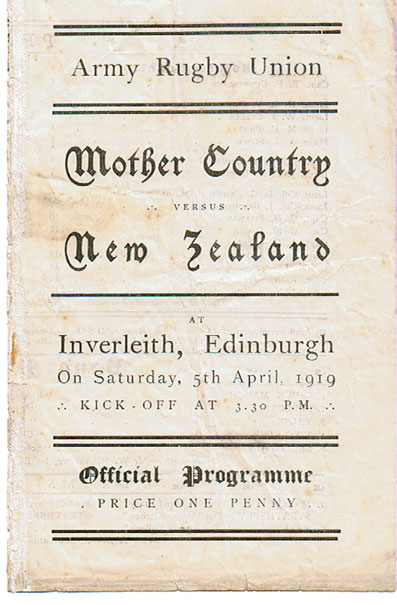
Programme for the match between the Mother Country and New Zealand service teams

	Date	Opponent	Location	Result	Score
Match 1		Royal Naval Division	Devonport	Drawn	0–0
Match 2	1 February	Monmouthshire	Crosskeys	Won	22–3
Match 3		United Services	Torquay	Won	9–0
Match 4		Canadian Forces	Chiswick	Won	12–0
Match 5		South African Services	Richmond	Won	26–5
Match 6		Coventry R.F.C.	Coventry	Won	14–0
Match 7		Australian Imperial Forces	Richmond	Won	9–0
Match 8		RAF ^{1}	Swansea	Won	22–3
Match 9		Canadian Expeditionary Force^{1}	Portsmouth	Won	11–0
Match 10		Yorkshire	Bradford	Won	44–5
Match 11		British XV	Leicester	Won	11–3
Match 12		RAF	Richmond	Won	3–0
Match 13		Gloucester	Gloucester	Won	15–12
Match 14	29 March	Cardiff	Cardiff	Drawn	0–0
Match 15		South African Forces^{1}	Twickenham	Won	14–5
Match 16	2 April	Maesteg	Maesteg	Won	8–3
Match 17 ('A' team)	5 April	Mother Country^{1}	Edinburgh	Won	6–3
Match 18 ('B' team)	5 April	Abertillery	Abertillery	Won	3–0
Match 19 ('B' team)	9 April	Cross Keys	Crosskeys	Won	6–0
Match 20 ('A' team)	12 April	Australian Imperial Forces^{1}	Bradford	Lost	5–6
Match 21 ('B' Team)	12 April	Pill Harriers	Newport	Drawn	0–0
Match 22 ('B' Team)	16 April	Ogmore Vale	Ogmore Vale	Won	12–7
Match 23 ('A' team)	16 April	Mother Country – King's Cup Final^{1}	Twickenham	Won	9–3
Match 24 ('A' team)	19 April	French Army	Twickenham	Won	20–3
Match 25 ('B' team)	19 April	Neath	Neath	Won	10–3
Match 26	21 April	Wales	Cardiff	Won	6–3
Match 27		Abergavenny	Abergavenny	Won	20–0
Match 28		Ebbw Vale	Ebbw Vale	Won	28–0
Match 29		Coventry	Coventry	Won	7–0
Match 30		Queen's University	Belfast	Won	18–0
Match 31		United Services	Salisbury	Won	20–7
Match 32		Devon	Torquay	Won	14–0
Match 33		Tredegar	Tredegar	Won	8–0
Match 34	5 May	Monmouthshire	Ebbw Vale	Lost	3–4
Match 35		French XV	Paris	Won	16–10
Match 36		Selection Francais	Pau	Won	16–6
Match 37		Selection Francais	Toulouse	Won	16–6
Match 38		Northern Command	Headingley	Won	33–0

^{1} The matches that made up the King's Cup competition.

== New Zealand Army in Wales ==
During the First World War, the ban on players who had switched to play professional rugby league from playing rugby union was lifted. This allowed players from both codes to play in services teams without threat of action. With the war over, the Welsh Rugby Union immediately sought to re-establish the amateur rules, and were suspicious that several of the New Zealand team had played professional rugby before the war and now wanted a guarantee that all the New Zealanders were amateurs. This view led one irate British Service officer to comment, "As if it matters a damn whether they are amateurs or professionals when they have come to this country to fight and die for us." The WRU, realising that they had misjudged public sentiment towards the Services teams, quickly dropped their complaint and did not raise the issue again.

=== Wales ===
21 April 1919

Wales	3–6	New Zealand Army
Pen: Shea		Pen: Stohr (2)

Cardiff Arms Park
Referee: R Charman (England)

Wales: Ianto Davies (Maesteg), Jerry Shea (Pill Harriers), Melbourne Thomas (Bridgend), Evan Rees (Swansea), Trevor Nicholas (Cardiff). Walter Martin (Newport), Ike Fowler (Llanelli), Glyn Stephens (Neath) capt., Jim Jones (Aberavon), William Havard (Llanelli), Gwyn Francis (Llanelli), Jack Whitfield (Pill Harriers), Aaron Rees (Swansea), Bill Morris (Abertillery), Tom Parker (Swansea)
New Zealand Army: C Capper, W Ford, L Stohr, P Storey, J Ryan capt., W Fea, C Brown, M Cain, E Hassell, J Kissick, J Moffitt, A Wilson, A West, A Singe, R Fogarty

== The King's Cup ==
The King's Cup was contested by six teams. The New Zealand Army, the British Army (known during the competition as the Mother Country), Australian Imperial Forces, Canadian Expeditionary Forces, South African Forces and the RAF.

The competition, sometimes referred to as the 'Inter-Services and Dominions Rugby Championship', consisted of a small league, whereby each of the teams played each other over a period of weeks. Once the teams had played each encounter, the two sides with the most wins would face each other for the right to play for the King's Cup at Twickenham. The winner of the final was then invited to play the French Army team, again at Twickenham. The matches were played in varying locations around Britain.

The New Zealand Army 'A' team's first encounter was with the RAF played at Swansea in Wales; New Zealand won 22–3. This was followed by another victory, this time against the Canadian Force at Portsmouth in England. After beating the South African Forces team at Twickenham, New Zealand travelled to Edinburgh in Scotland to play the 'Mother Country', the British Army team. This was the closest encounter to date, with New Zealand winning 6–3. With four wins from four encounters, New Zealand had already secured their place in the final, but then lost the final match of the round against Australia at Bradford. This was the first loss of the tour for the New Zealand Army, for either the A or B team.

The final in London was between New Zealand and the 'Mother Country' team. James Ryan led his team to a 9–3 victory, earning the right to Face the French Army three days later. After the win over France, Ryan was award the King's Cup, presented by King George V. With the King's Cup Championship over, the 'A' team returned to Wales to rejoin the rest of the squad ready to face the Wales team at Swansea.

== Bibliography ==
- Billot, John (1972). All Blacks in Wales. Ferndale: Ron Jones Publications.
- Hughes, Gareth (1986). The Scarlets: A History of Llanelli Rugby Club. Llanelli: Llanelli Borough Council. ISBN 0-906821-05-3.
- Smith, David; Williams, Gareth (1980). Fields of Praise: The Official History of The Welsh Rugby Union. Cardiff: University of Wales Press. ISBN 0-7083-0766-3.
