= James Douglas (rugby union) =

New Zealand rugby union player (1890–1964)

- Full name: James Burt Douglas
- Born: 11 July 1890 Shag Point, New Zealand
- Died: 21 December 1964 (aged 74) Dunedin, New Zealand

Rugby union career
- Position: Loose forward
Provincial / State sides
Years	Team	Apps	(Points)
1912–15	Otago	15	
International career
Years	Team	Apps	(Points)
1913	New Zealand		

James Burt Douglas (11 July 1890 – 21 December 1964) was a New Zealand international rugby union player.

A loose forward, Douglas made his Otago representative debut in 1912 and the following year appeared in nine uncapped matches for the All Blacks. He first turned out for the All Blacks in a home fixture against Wellington, then undertook a tour of North America, contributing seven tries from eight tour matches.

Douglas and Otago teammate James Graham were both banned from rugby union in 1915 after being accused of accepting bribes to underperform in a match with their club Southern. He returned to rugby at the end of the war playing for the New Zealand Army team and was officially readmitted to rugby in 1922.

== See also ==
- List of New Zealand national rugby union players
