= Paul Kane (rugby union) =

- Full name: Paul Francis Kane
- Born: 27 November 1891 Timaru, New Zealand
- Died: 11 August 1953 (aged 61) Mount Albert, New Zealand
- School: St Patrick's College

Rugby union career
- Position: Second five-eighth
Provincial / State sides
Years	Team	Apps	(Points)
- West Coast
-	Wellington		
International career
Years	Team	Apps	(Points)
1923	New Zealand		

Paul Francis Kane (27 November 1891 — 11 August 1953), also known as Paul Markham, was a New Zealand priest and international rugby union player of the 1920s.

Kane was born in Timaru and undertook his early education at the local Marist Brothers School. He later boarded at St Patrick's College on Cambridge Terrace in Wellington, where he had three years with the first XV.

A Catholic priest, Kane was ordained in 1917 and played his rugby under an alias, taking his mother's maiden name. He captained both the West Coast and Wellington in provincial matches, appearing for the latter in a match against the 1921 Springboks. While the All Blacks were engaged in their series with the Springboks, a second string New Zealand team was formed for a concurrent series against a touring New South Wales side, for which Kane was named as the second five-eighth when they faced the Waratahs in Christchurch.

== See also ==
- List of New Zealand national rugby union players
