= Blue Spur =

Blue Spur may refer to the following in New Zealand:

- Blue Spur, Otago, a locality near Lawrence
- Blue Spur, West Coast a locality near Hokitika
