= James Ryan (rugby union, born 1887) =

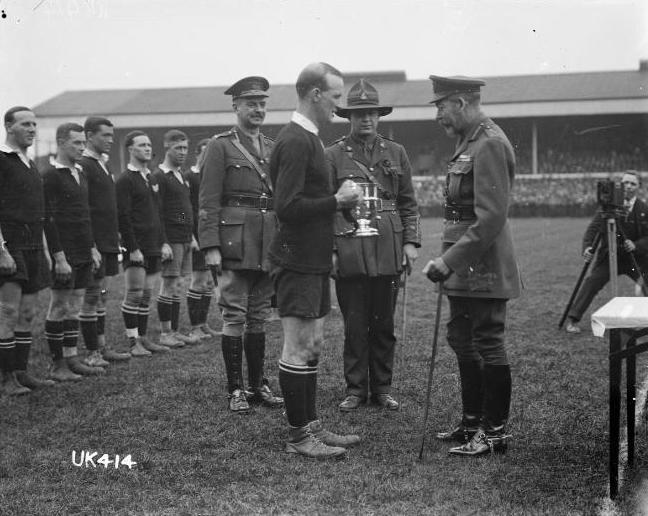
- Ryan being presented with the King's Cup by King George V
- Born: James Ryan; 8 February 1887 Masterton, New Zealand
- Died: 17 July 1957 (aged 70) Feilding, New Zealand
- School: St Patrick's College
- Notable relative: Eddie Ryan (brother)

Rugby union career
- Position: Utility back
Amateur team(s)
Years	Team	Apps	(Points)
1905–15, 1920	Petone		
1920	Feilding		
Provincial / State sides
Years	Team	Apps	(Points)
1905–15, 1920	Wellington		
1920	Manawatu		
International career
Years	Team	Apps	(Points)
1910, 14	New Zealand	4	(0)
1919	New Zealand Army		

James Ryan (8 February 1887 – 17 July 1957) was a New Zealand rugby union player who represented his country internationally. A utility back, Ryan was versatile in his ability to play throughout the backline.

Born in Masterton, Ryan was educated at St Patrick's College in Wellington. He joined the Petone club after leaving school. He made his debut for the Wellington province in 1905 as an eighteen year old.

Ryan was first selected for the national side, the All Blacks, in 1910. A side was chosen to travel to Australia and 8 matches were arranged. He played in 5 of these, including 1 test match at fullback.

The next international tours New Zealand had, took place in 1913. One, a visiting Australian side and one, further afar to the United States. Ryan was selected for neither of these but he continued playing at a provincial level.

The next year, however, another tour to Australia was organised and Ryan was selected again to play for his country. Of the eleven matches he missed just one game against Metropolitan Union. Ryan captained his side twice. First, in their warm-up match against Wellington before they left. And again, against Central-Western Districts once in Australia. Adding to this, he also played in the three test matches scheduled against Australia. The squad won all 10 of their games while overseas. The only loss coming against Wellington in the warm up fixture.

A soldier in the Otago Infantry Regiment during World War I, Ryan captained the New Zealand Army team in 1919. Leading them in the King's Cup. A trophy played for by army personnel of New Zealand, Australia, Canada, Great Britain, South Africa and the Royal Air Force. New Zealand, making the final, defeated the British 9 points to 3. Ryan suffered an injury in this game, but nonetheless led his team to victory. He was thus, presented with the King's Cup by George V. The French Army were then invited to play the cup winners and the New Zealanders won 20 points to 3.

After this Ryan continued to tour Great Britain and France. Included was an international match against Wales, which Ryan captained. The All Blacks won 6 points to 3. Before they sailed home, the party set off for South Africa to play a further 12 games.

Upon returning to New Zealand, Ryan appeared for both Wellington and Manawatu. The latter of which he finished his final three playing years with. He then became a Manawatu selector and coach for the team through the 1920s and 30's.

Ryan had six other brothers who played for the Petone club. Three of them, Joe, Michael and Bill also played for Wellington. Another, Eddie, notably became a 1 match All Black in 1921. Eddie also played in the New Zealand Army side.
