= 1920 New Zealand rugby union tour of New South Wales =

- Top point scorer: Percy Storey (47)
- Top try scorer: Percy Storey (15)
Summary
P	W	D	L
Total
10	9	1	0
Test match
3	3	0	0
Opponent
P	W	D	L
New South Wales (Note: The three matches played by New South Wales were retroactively accorded Test status by the Australian Rugby Union in 1986, but remain as tour matches only for the NZRU.)
3	3	0	0

Tour chronology
- Previous tour: 1914 Australia
- Next tour: 1922 N.S. Wales

The 1920 New Zealand tour rugby to New South Wales was the ninth tour by the New Zealand national team to Australia. The three most important matches on the tour were played against the New South Wales selection, and the All Blacks won the 3 match series 3–0.

After the First World War, rugby union in Australia was initially only resumed within New South Wales (many players switched to rugby league, especially in Queensland), so official Test matches between the two national sides did not resume until 1929.

In 1986 the Australian Rugby Union accorded Test status to the matches New South Wales played against full international teams in the 1920 to 1928 period, but the New Zealand Rugby Union does not record these matches as Tests.

Before and after the tour, New Zealand played some matches in their own country against provincial selections. The following year, New South Wales visited New Zealand on their 1921 tour.

== Match summary ==
Complete list of matches played by the All Blacks in New South Wales:

Test matches

#	Date	Rival	City	Venue	Score
1	10 Jul	Auckland RU	Auckland	Eden Park	11–11
2	14 Jul	Manawatu / Horowhenua / Wanganui (Note: Combined team of provincial unions.)	Palmerston North	Showground	39–0
3	24 Jul	New South Wales	Sydney	Sports Ground	26–15
4	28 Jul	Manning River District	Taree	Tare Ground	70–9
5	31 Jul	New South Wales	Sydney	Sports Ground	14–6
6	2 Aug	Metropolitan Union	Sydney	Showground	20–11
7	4 Aug	A N.S.W.	Sydney	Sports Ground	31–18
8	7 Aug	New South Wales	Sydney	Sports Ground	24–13
9	11 Aug	Metropolitan Union	Sydney	University Oval	79–5
10	18 Aug	Wellington RU	Wellington	Athletic Park	38–3

Balance
Pl	W	D	L	Ps	Pc
10	9	1	0	352	91
