= Bill Lindsay (rugby union) =

- Full name: William George Lindsay
- Born: 29 December 1879 Waikouaiti, New Zealand
- Died: 15 May 1965 (aged 85) Dunedin, New Zealand

Rugby union career
- Position: Hooker
Provincial / State sides
Years	Team	Apps	(Points)
1912–18	Southland		
International career
Years	Team	Apps	(Points)
1914	New Zealand		

William George Lindsay (29 December 1879 — 15 May 1965) was a New Zealand international rugby union player.

Born in Waikouaiti, Lindsay came late to first-class rugby, not debuting for Southland until the age of 32 in 1912. He was an All Blacks replacement on their 1914 tour of Australia, after hooker Peter Williams became unavailable, making him one of the oldest players to debut for New Zealand at 34. Appearing in four uncapped matches, Lindsay played a warm-up match against Wellington, then three matches over the course of the tour, which the All Blacks finished undefeated.

Lindsay captained Athletic to a Galbraith Shield title in 1918 and continued playing club rugby until the age of 42, lastly with Dunedin club Pirates. He coached in the Dunedin area for many years, including with Pirates and Taieri.

== See also ==
- List of New Zealand national rugby union players
