= Trevor Nicholas =

Trevor Nicholas may refer to:

- Trevor Nicholas (rugby union) (1894—1979), Welsh rugby union player
- Trevor Dion Nicholas, American actor and singer
