= Richard McKenzie =

Richard McKenzie may refer to:

- Richard McKenzie (actor) (born 1930), American character actor
- Richard McKenzie (Tasmanian politician) (1850–1919), Australian politician
- Richard McKenzie (South Australian politician) (1883–1959), Australian politician
- Rich McKenzie (born 1971), former American football linebacker
- Jock McKenzie (rugby union, born 1892) (1892–1968), New Zealand rugby player
