= Aaron Rees =

- Born: 2 August 1886 Maesteg, Glamorgan, Wales
- Died: 22 January 1950 (aged 63) Swansea, Wales

Rugby union career
- Position: Wing-forward
International career
Years	Team	Apps	(Points)
1919	Wales	1	(0)

Aaron Rees (2 August 1886 — 22 January 1950) was a Welsh international rugby union player.

Born in Maesteg, Rees captained his hometown club Maesteg RFC and gained a single Wales cap, as one of their forwards in the one-off match against the 1919 New Zealand Army team in Swansea.

Rees was a mine worker at Navigation Colliery in his younger days and later worked in construction.

== See also ==
- List of Wales national rugby union players
