= Sal Irvine =

New Zealand rugby union player

- Born: John Gilbert Irvine; 1 July 1888 Dunedin, New Zealand
- Died: 10 June 1939 (aged 50) Queenstown, New Zealand
- Weight: 98 kg (216 lb)

Rugby union career
- Position: Lock
Provincial / State sides
| Years | Team | Apps | (Points) |
| 1912–1919 | Otago | | |
International career
| Years | Team | Apps | (Points) |
| 1914 | New Zealand | 3 | (0) |

John Gilbert "Sal" Irvine (1 July 1888 – 10 June 1939) was a New Zealand rugby union player. A lock, Irvine represented Otago at a provincial level on 21 occasions either side of World War I, and was a member of the New Zealand national side, the All Blacks, on their 1914 tour of Australia. On that tour, he played in 10 of the 11 matches, including all three internationals.
