= Percy Storey =

- Born: Percival Wright Storey; 11 February 1897 Temuka, New Zealand
- Died: 4 October 1975 (aged 78) Timaru, New Zealand
- Height: 1.75 m (5 ft 9 in)
- Weight: 81 kg (179 lb)
- Notable relative: Laurel McAlister (sister)

Rugby union career
- Position: Wing three-quarter
Provincial / State sides
| Years | Team | Apps | (Points) |
| 1920–24 | South Canterbury | 10 | |
International career
| Years | Team | Apps | (Points) |
| 1919 | New Zealand Army | | |
| 1920–21 | New Zealand | 2 | (3) |

Percival Wright Storey (11 February 1897 – 4 October 1975) was a New Zealand rugby union player. A wing three-quarter, Storey represented South Canterbury at a provincial level, and was a member of the New Zealand national side, the All Blacks, from 1920 to 1921. He played 10 matches for the All Blacks including two internationals, scoring a total of 50 points (16 tries and one conversion).

Born at Temuka on 11 February 1897, Storey was one of three children of Elizabeth Storey (née Wright) and her husband, William Storey, a tailor. His older sister, Laurel, became a noted community leader, and his older brother, Robert, was killed in action on the Western Front in 1917.

Storey served in the New Zealand Expeditionary Force as a sergeant in the Otago Infantry Regiment during World War I. He enlisted in July 1916 and was wounded by shrapnel in his right thigh at Passchendaele in October 1917. After the conclusion of the war, he was a member of the New Zealand Army rugby team that won the King's Cup and then toured South Africa, scoring 13 tries.

During World War II, Storey served in the army in New Zealand as a warrant officer class 1 from 1940 to 1945. He died at Timaru on 4 October 1975.
