= St Patrick's College, Wellington =

St Patrick's College

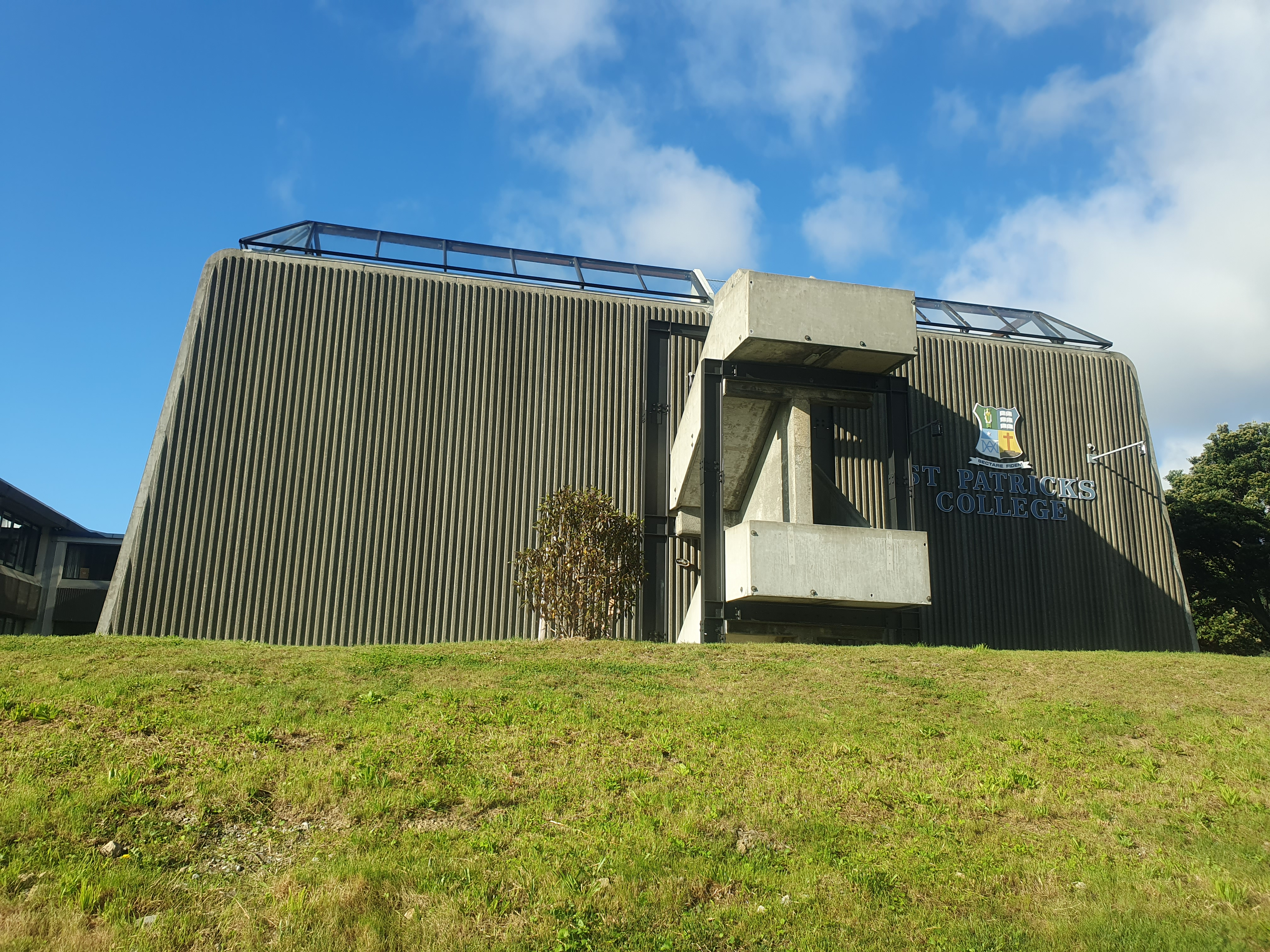

Location
- 581 Evans Bay Parade; Kilbirnie, Wellington, 6022; New Zealand; 41°18′47″S 174°47′46″E

Information
- Type: State integrated Catholic Non-profit All-boys secondary education institution
- Motto: Latin: Sectare Fidem (Hold Firm to the Faith)
- Established: 1885; 141 years ago
- Founder: Archbishop Francis Redwood
- Ministry of Education Institution no.: 276
- Rector: Mike Savali
- Grades: 9–13
- Gender: Boys
- Enrolment: 717 (July 2026)
- Socio-economic decile: 8P
- Website: Official school website

St Patrick's College is a Roman Catholic boys' secondary school in Wellington, New Zealand.

== History ==
Founded by Archbishop Francis Redwood SM, St Patrick's opened on 1 June 1885 with nine day-boys and twelve boarders.

The college represents one of the earliest educational establishments of the Society of Mary (Marists), the religious congregation whose members accompanied Bishop Jean Baptiste Pompallier to New Zealand in 1838, and who played a prominent role in the establishment of the Catholic church in New Zealand. The first members of staff, Irish Marists who came principally from the Marist College at Dundalk, established a number of Marist colleges such as St Bede's College, Christchurch and St John's College, Hastings in New Zealand.

Plans in 1929 envisaged the college moving to a more suitable site at Silverstream in the Hutt Valley, but a high demand for education eventually led to a split in 1931: the original establishment continued and the boarding section moved to become St Patrick's College, Silverstream, thus allowing room for the expansion of day-student numbers on the Cambridge Terrace site in central Wellington city.

From that time the city college has borne the nickname "St Pat's Town". The two separate Colleges bearing the same name have developed a shared history and a healthy rivalry: they share the St Patrick's College Old Boys' Association also. In 1979, St Patrick's College shifted from its Cambridge Terrace site to a new facility near Kilbirnie Park in Evans Bay.

=== Sexual abuse of children ===
In Nov. 2020 Father Frank Durning SM was mentioned in the NZ Royal Commission of Inquiry into Abuse in Care hearings.

In 2018, the school stated to Radio New Zealand that it had "no records of sex abuse committed by a priest against boys." The same article mentions that "some old boys of St Patrick's College Wellington have spoken of being molested by Father Fred (ed: Francis) Durning, who had top positions at the school in the 1940s, 1950s" and in the early 1980s. Father Durning left St Patrick's Silverstream in 1955 to become vice-rector at St Patrick's in Wellington. The Church has accepted that Durning was a known paedophile.

In 2016, St Pats alumni Father Peter Hercock was sentenced to 6 years and 7 months jail for rape and sexual abuse of four Wellington girls during the 1970s and 1980s.

In a 2002 article in the New Zealand Herald, a former Marist priest and St Pats staff member Chanel Houlahan, spoke out critically about the Church's approach to dealing with cases of sexual abuse, stating that he was "encouraged by the church's change of heart in confronting sexual abuse, but it now needs to be made safe for the people." The Catholic Church in New Zealand has yet to bring in external audits for child safety practices, two years after promising it would.

== Sport ==
Aside from the winter and summer tournament weeks, major events on the calendar include:

- Old Boys' Cup – Annual Athletics competition against brother college St Patrick's Silverstream. St Pat's Town won 11 Consecutive titles between 2011 and 2022
- McEvedy Shield – Annual Athletics competition against 3 other colleges in the Wellington region including Rongotai College, Wellington College and St Patrick's Silverstream. The shield was donated in 1922 by Dr P F McEvedy.
- 1st XV Rugby Union season – Involving Rongotai College, Wellington College, Hato Paora College, St John's College, St Patrick's College Silverstream, Francis Douglas Memorial College and St Bedes College (2014 will be the first time the traditional has been played since the 1970s). The Traditional Rugby match between St Pat's Town and Wellington College is recognised as one of the great rivalries in New Zealand secondary school rugby, due to the fact that the two schools were, for nearly a century, in close proximity to each other by the Basin Reserve and also that it is one of the longest standing traditional fixtures in the country, having been played since 1885. As of 2010, Wellington College have won 75 matches, St Pat's have won 43 matches, with 8 matches being drawn. The first rugby game televised live in New Zealand was this traditional fixture, at Athletic Park on 27 June 1967, with St Pat's winning 9–8. The 100th match was drawn 3–3 in 1984.
- St John's College Sports Exchange – Annual winter sports exchange between the two schools in rugby, basketball, soccer, hockey and badminton. The venue of this event alternates each year, i.e. In 2005 it was held at St Pat's and in 2006 it was held at St John's.
- St Pat's Silverstream Sports Exchange – Annual winter sports exchange between the two schools in rugby, basketball, soccer, badminton, hockey and cross country running. The venue of this event alternates each year, i.e. In 2005 it was held at St Pat's Silverstream and in 2006 it was held at St Pat's Town and so forth.
- Wellington College Sports Exchange – Annual winter sports exchange involving the 1st XV rugby team and the 1st XI soccer team. The venue of this event alternates each year: in 2005 it took place at St Pat's Town and in 2006 at Wellington College.

St. Pat's Town has produced 20 All Blacks, including two All Black captains, Maurice Brownlie and Jerry Collins. Others include E. Harper, J. McKenzie, J. Ryan, T. Lynch, P. Markham, L. Brownlie, P. McCarthy, J. Blake, T. Corkill, A. Mahoney, J. Best (transferred to Silverstream in 1931), R. O'Callaghan, B. Finlay, M. Berry (1st All Black from Kilbirnie site), M. Proctor, B. Proctor, X. Numia and S. Lauaki

St. Pat's Town has produced 6 All Whites. including James Mcgarry, Kosta Barbarouses, Liberato Cacace, Clayton Lewis, Tinoi Christie, and Lukas Kelly-Heald, Also 1 South Sudan player, Manyumow Achol. With multiple Wellington Phoenix current and former players including Alby Kelly-Heald, and Eamonn McCarron. While other former Wellington Phoenix players Jackson Manuel, Noah Karunaratne, and Marco Lorenz.

The St. Patrick's College Rugby Club formally became a member of the Wellington Rugby Football Union on 26 March 1886, with Messrs Saunders and McMahon the first Club delegates to the Union.

== Culture ==
The college choir, Con Anima, were regular attendees of the national finale between 1999 – 2009. (They would usually receive Silver or Gold Awards) Con Anima, won the national platinum award in 2004. After a 6-year hiatus from making the national finale, Con Anima made the national finale in 2015 where they received a Silver Award. In 2018, Con Anima qualified for the national finale where they received a Bronze award. They again qualified for the national finale in 2023, again receiving a Bronze Award. They again qualified for the national finale in 2025, and receiving Silver Award. The choir have produced five albums, and sing under the direction of HOD music, Roger Powdrell. Their most recent CD, Jubilation, was launched to commemorate the 125th Jubilee of St Patrick's College. The college has a proud history in the art of A Capella singing, with many significant national placings, including 3 national quartet championships, 3 national chorus championships and 2 chorus silver medals. Most recently, the quartet Fourth Inversion set an international secondary scoring record with an average score of 75.1 in 2015. The Saints Chorus are the three-time 2010, 2011 & 2013 NZ Male Chorus Champions. They attended the 2011 BHS International Youth Chorus Festival in Las Vegas, NV USA, where they placed in the Top 10 and were the highest placed secondary school chorus in this International Contest.

== School structure ==
Students are allocated into one of four houses and compete throughout the year in house competitions. Each house is named after an important person in the school history, as follows:

Kennedy for Martin Kennedy (yellow)

Watters for Dr Watters (Father Watters) (green)

Chanel for St Peter Chanel (blue)

Redwood for Archbishop Francis Redwood (red)

== Notable staff ==
- David Kennedy – priest, astronomer and educator
- Paul Martin – archbishop
- Doug Walker, head of science at St Patrick's College, Kilbirnie, science teacher of the year, winner of 2022 Prime Minister's Science Teacher prize.

== Notable alumni ==
=== Arts ===
- Geoff Cochrane – poet
- Richard Farrell – classical pianist
- Alex Galvin – film director
- Michael Galvin – actor, most notably on Shortland Street
- Pua Magasiva – actor
- Robbie Magasiva – actor
- Geoff Murphy – film director

=== Medicine ===
- Alexander Joseph McIlroy (1871 - drowned 1 August 1925, 1885 - 1887 boarder, Dunedin) – Medical Practitioner MD (Edin)

=== Public service ===
- Paul Eagle – Labour member of parliament for Rongotai and former Deputy Mayor of Wellington
- Chris Finlayson – National Party member of parliament, cabinet minister and Attorney-General of New Zealand
- Lou Gardiner – Chief of Army, 2006 to 2009.
- Denis McGrath CBE – Deputy Mayor of Wellington (1962–65)
- Greg O'Connor – Labour member of parliament for Ohariu and former President of the New Zealand Police Association
- Phillip O'Shea – New Zealand Herald of Arms Extraordinary
- Paul Swain – former Labour member of parliament and cabinet minister

=== Religion ===
- Thomas O'Shea – former archbishop of Wellington
- John Rodgers – Vicar Apostolic of Tonga (1953–1957), Vicar Apostolic of Tonga and Niue (1957–1966), Bishop of Tonga (1966–1973), Bishop of Rarotonga (1973–1977), auxiliary bishop of Auckland (1977–1985), superior of the mission, Funafuti, Tuvalu (1986).
- Thomas Williams – cardinal, former archbishop of Wellington, patron of the college
- Soane Patita Paini Mafi – member of the College of Cardinals and Bishop of Tonga & Niue

=== Science ===
- James Brontë Gatenby – professor of zoology and comparative anatomy at Trinity College, Dublin
- Athol Rafter – teacher, nuclear chemist

=== Sport ===
- Arnold Tancred – Wallaby 1927–28 and President of the New South Wales Rugby Union 1959.
- Kosta Barbarouses – footballer (Wellington Phoenix FC, All Whites, Brisbane Roar FC)
- Maurice Brownlie – rugby union player (All Blacks)
- Tinoi Christie – footballer (All Whites)
- Jerry Collins – rugby union player (Wellington Lions, Hurricanes, All Blacks)
- Peter Delaney – New Zealand Olympic Rower (1964 Summer Olympics)
- Lome Fa'atau – rugby union player (Wellington Lions, Hurricanes, Manu Samoa)
- Alehana Mara – rugby league player (NZ Warriors)
- Eamonn McCarron (born 2007) professional footballer
- Jonathan Millmow – cricketer (Black Caps, Wellington)
- Gareth Paddison – professional golfer (PGA Tour of Australasia)
- Quentin Rew – New Zealand Olympian (London Olympics)
- Clayton Lewis – footballer (Scunthorpe United F.C., All Whites)
- Billy Proctor - rugby union player (Wellington Lions, Hurricanes, All Blacks)
- Matt Proctor – rugby union player (Wellington Lions, Hurricanes, All Blacks))
- Liberato Cacace – footballer (Wellington Phoenix FC, All Whites)
- Brian Lima – rugby union player (Auckland, Blues, Highlanders, Manu Samoa)
- Izayah Le'afa – basketball player
- Tom Vodanovich – basketball player
- Elton Moncrieff – rugby union player (Reds, Crusaders, Gloucester, Worcester Warriors)

=== Other ===
- Tipene O'Regan – kaumātua of Ngāi Tahu
- Frank Renouf – businessman and philanthropist
