= Jim Wylie =

Australia & NZ international rugby union player (1887–1956)

- Born: James Thomas Wylie; 26 October 1887 Galatea, New Zealand
- Died: 19 December 1956 (aged 69) Palo Alto, California, USA
- Height: 1.90 m (6 ft 3 in)
- Weight: 87 kg (192 lb)
- University: Auckland University College; Stanford University
- Occupation(s): Fruit wholesaler and exporter

Rugby union career
- Position: Loose forward
Provincial / State sides
Years	Team	Apps	(Points)
1910	Auckland	6	
1911–12	New South Wales	4	
1913	Auckland	6	
International career
Years	Team	Apps	(Points)
1912	Australia	0	(0)
1913	New Zealand	2	(3)
Coaching career
- Years: Team
- 1917–48: Stanford University

James Thomas Wylie (26 October 1887 – 19 December 1956) was a New Zealand rugby union player, who represented both the country of his birth and Australia. He went on to coach the Stanford University rugby team for over 30 years from 1917.

Born in Galatea in 1887, Wylie was a tall man at 1.90 m (6 ft 3 in), and played as a loose forward. He first represented Auckland in 1910, playing six matches, before moving to Sydney for the next two years. There he made four appearances for New South Wales against Queensland, and in 1912 he was a member of the Australian team that toured North America. Because of injury he only made four appearances on that tour, and did not play in the international against the United States. Wylie returned to New Zealand in 1913, making a further six appearances for Auckland, and being selected as a member of the New Zealand national side, the All Blacks. He played an international against Australia in Wellington and then was a part of the tour of North America. He played in 11 matches on that tour, including the test against the United States, in which he scored a try.

Wylie remained in the United States after the tour, and studied engineering at Stanford University, where he turned out for the university rugby team. In 1917, he became the Stanford rugby head coach, and continued in that role until at least 1948.
