= David Kennedy (astronomer) =

Catholic priest, astronomer, and teacher

David Kennedy (27 April 1864 – 10 March 1936) was born at Lyttelton, New Zealand, the son of an Irish mother and a Scottish father who came to New Zealand from Melbourne in 1863. He became the first New Zealand born priest of the Society of Mary (Marists), a noted astronomer and educator.

As a boy he showed a keen interest in both theology and science. Because of his undoubted intelligence and promise he was sent to study at the Marist college at Dundalk, Ireland in 1878. In 1884 he entered the Marist novitiate at Paignton, England, and in 1886 he was awarded BA at the Royal University of Ireland in mathematics and science. For the following two years he taught at his old school in Dundalk, during which time he wrote a textbook, Natural philosophy for junior students, covering a variety of scientific topics including mechanics, hydrostatics, pneumatics, gravity and motion. It was published in Dublin in 1891 (and went to a 10th edition in 1926). Kennedy had continued his theological work, studying in France and Spain, and was ordained to the priesthood in Rome in 1891. There he studied at the Pontifical Gregorian University, completing degrees in canon law and divinity in 1892.

In 1893 he returned to New Zealand to teach at the newly opened Marist seminary at Meeanee near Napier. Kennedy continued his scientific pursuits and gave public lectures illustrated with lantern slides. He was interested in entomology and was adept at microscopic photography, and from 1905 to 1909 he operated a meteorological station.

In 1909 he moved to St. Patrick's College, Wellington where he was rector until 1917.

Kennedy's first love however was astronomy. Royalties from his book had helped fund an observatory he built at Meeanee. In July 1907 with a nine-inch photo-visual refracting telescope he opened a new observatory in Meeanee observatory. This was, at the time, the best equipped in New Zealand. A month later it was used to study Comet Daniel.

In 1910 together with two seminarians, Joseph Cullen and Ignatius von Gottfried, he photographed Halley's Comet. The photographs of this period were the best in the world for that appearance of the comet, and were republished in the United States by NASA in 1986.

In 1911, the Marist Seminary together with the observatory was shifted from Meeanee to Greenmeadows. However the observatory was destroyed in a storm in 1912.

Kennedy became rector at the Greenmeadows Seminary from 1918 to 1920, but lacked the money to re-establish the observatory.

Kennedy gave evidence before the Education Commission of 1912, and while at St Patrick's College enthusiastically promoted the study of science. One of his pupils, James Bronte Gatenby, in 1920 became the first recipient of a DPhil degree from Oxford University, and was later professor of zoology and comparative anatomy at Trinity College Dublin.

Kennedy became a fellow of the Royal Astronomical and Royal Meteorological societies. He was also admired for his skill as a cellist.

From 1929 to 1934 he was the provincial superior of the Society of Mary in New Zealand.

He died in Wellington on 10 March 1936.
