= Sam Cockroft =

- Born: Samuel Cockroft; 13 May 1864 Invercargill, New Zealand
- Died: 1 January 1955 (aged 90) Wellington, New Zealand
- Weight: 81 kg (179 lb)
- Notable relative: Eric Cockroft (nephew)
- Occupation: Storeman

Rugby union career
- Position: Hooker
Provincial / State sides
Years	Team	Apps	(Points)
1887–92	Wellington		
1893	Manawatu	5	
1894	Hawke's Bay		
1895–96	Queensland		
International career
Years	Team	Apps	(Points)
1893–94	New Zealand	0	(0)

Samuel Cockroft (13 May 1864 – 1 January 1955) was a New Zealand rugby union player. A hooker, Cockroft represented Wellington, Manawatu and Hawke's Bay at a provincial level, and was a member of the New Zealand national side, the All Blacks, in 1893 and 1894. He played 12 matches for the All Blacks but did not play any internationals. He also played for Queensland in 1895 and 1896.
