= Tom Fisher (rugby union) =

Rugby player (1891–1968)

- Born: Thomas Fisher; 27 May 1891 Brunnerton, New Zealand
- Died: 20 March 1968 (aged 76) Wellington, New Zealand
- Occupation: Publican

Rugby union career
- Position: Loose forward
Provincial / State sides
Years	Team	Apps	(Points)
1913–15, 19	Buller	11	
1920–22	Marlborough	13	
International career
Years	Team	Apps	(Points)
1914	New Zealand	0	(0)

Thomas Fisher (27 May 1891 – 20 March 1968) was a New Zealand rugby union player. A loose forward, Fisher represented Buller and Marlborough at a provincial level. He was a member of the New Zealand national side, the All Blacks, on their 1914 tour of Australia, playing five games and scoring one try, but he did not appear in any test matches.

Fisher died in Wellington on 20 March 1968, and was buried at Karori Cemetery.
