= Patrick McCarthy (rugby union) =

- Born: 28 June 1893 Tomona, New Zealand
- Died: 1 July 1976 (aged 83) Brisbane, Australia
- School: St Patrick's College Napier Boys' High School

Rugby union career
- Position: Halfback
Provincial / State sides
Years	Team	Apps	(Points)
- Canterbury
International career
Years	Team	Apps	(Points)
1923	New Zealand		

Patrick McCarthy (28 June 1893 – 1 July 1976) was a New Zealand international rugby union player.

McCarthy was educated at Napier Boys' High School and St Patrick's College in Wellington. He captained the St Patrick's College 1st XV for three seasons. After World War I, McCarthy became an ordained priest and took up a teaching position at St Bede's College, during which time he played rugby for Christchurch club Marist.

A halfback, McCarthy was 30 years of age on his representative debut for Canterbury in 1923 and in the same year represented the All Blacks in the second of three home fixtures against New South Wales, deputising Jimmy Mill.

McCarthy subsequently immigrated to Australia to teach.

== See also ==
- List of New Zealand national rugby union players
