= Ianto Davies =

Welsh rugby union player (1892–1945)

- Born: Evan Davies; 6 September 1892 Maesteg, Wales
- Died: 10 September 1945 (aged 53) Maesteg, Wales
- School: Plasnewydd School
- Occupation: Collier

Rugby union career
- Position: full back
Amateur team(s)
Years	Team	Apps	(Points)
–	Maesteg Rovers		
–	Maesteg RFC		
–	London Welsh RFC		
–	Llanelli RFC		
–	Glamorgan County RFC		
International career
Years	Team	Apps	(Points)
1919	Wales	1	(0)

Evan "Ianto" Davies (6 September 1892 – 10 September 1945) was a Welsh international rugby union full back who played club rugby for Llanelli and Maesteg. He won a single cap for Wales and also played county rugby for Glamorgan

== Rugby career ==
Born in Maesteg, Wales, Davies first played rugby as a school boy for Plasnewydd School. He progressed to local team Maesteg Rovers, before joining Maesteg RFC. Davies' rugby career was put on hold with the outbreak of World War I, where he served in the Royal Field Artillery and Welch Regiment. On his return to Britain after the end of hostilities, he rejoined Maesteg.

The first game played by the Wales national team after the war was against the touring New Zealand Army. With so many of the pre-war team either too old or now no longer fit to play, the Wales team was made up of newly capped players, many of whom were ex-services. Davies was given his first and only cap in this game, played at the Cardiff Arms Park on 21 April 1919. Although Wales lost 3-6, Davies' cap gave him the honour of being the first player to come from the Maesteg club to represent his country.

For the 1920/21 season, Davies was made captain of Maesteg. He later played for both Llanelli and London Welsh and also for Glamorgan County.

== Bibliography ==
- Jenkins, John M.; et al. (1991). Who's Who of Welsh International Rugby Players. Wrexham: Bridge Books. ISBN 1-872424-10-4.
- Smith, David; Williams, Gareth (1980). Fields of Praise: The Official History of The Welsh Rugby Union. Cardiff: University of Wales Press. ISBN 0-7083-0766-3.
