= Jack O'Brien (rugby union) =

- Full name: John Gerald O'Brien
- Born: 9 December 1889 Wellington, New Zealand
- Died: 9 January 1958 (aged 68) Kiwitahi, New Zealand
- Height: 173 cm (5 ft 8 in)
- Weight: 70 kg (154 lb)

Rugby union career
- Position: Fullback
Provincial / State sides
Years	Team	Apps	(Points)
- Auckland
International career
Years	Team	Apps	(Points)
1914	New Zealand	1	(0)

John Gerald O'Brien (9 December 1889 — 9 January 1958) was a New Zealand international rugby union player.

Born in Wellington, O'Brien was a lightly built fullback, known for his reliability under high kicks.

O'Brien played his rugby in Auckland with Marist and made his Auckland representative debut in 1910. He gained his first All Black call up for the 1914 tour of Australia, debuting in the opening Test at the Sydney Sports Ground, before a broken leg ended his tour early. Following war time service with the Divisional Signals Company, O'Brien played in the New Zealand Army team that won the 1919 Kings Cup and toured Australia again with the All Blacks in 1920, playing two unofficial Test matches against New South Wales.

== See also ==
- List of New Zealand national rugby union players
