= Eddie Ryan (rugby union) =

- Full name: Edmond Ryan
- Born: 17 February 1891 Petone, New Zealand
- Died: 29 August 1965 (aged 74) Wainuiomata, New Zealand
- Occupation: Boilermaker

Rugby union career
- Position: Centre three-quarter
Provincial / State sides
Years	Team	Apps	(Points)
1912–23	Wellington	43	
International career
Years	Team	Apps	(Points)
1921	New Zealand		

Edmond Ryan (17 February 1891 – 29 August 1965) was a New Zealand international rugby union player.

A native of Petone, Ryan was one of eight rugby playing siblings from a family with Irish origins. This included All Blacks utility back James Ryan who was an elder brother. All brothers played for Petone and Eddie was one of five to represent Wellington, which he debuted for in 1912 before the outbreak of war.

Ryan served with the New Zealand Field Artillery in World War I and was decorated with the British War Medal.

An attacking centre, Ryan took part in the 1919 King's Cup competition with the New Zealand Services team, then made his solitary All Blacks appearance in a match against New South Wales at Christchurch in 1921.

== See also ==
- List of New Zealand national rugby union players
