= Bill Morris (rugby union, born 1894) =

- Full name: William George Henry Morris
- Born: 20 January 1894 Cwmtillery, Wales
- Died: 14 July 1967 (aged 73) Bournemouth, England

Rugby union career
- Position: Forward
International career
Years	Team	Apps	(Points)
1919–21	Wales	3	(0)

William George Henry Morris (20 January 1894 — 14 July 1967) was a Welsh international rugby union player.

A Cwmtillery-born forward, Morris played for Abertillery and London Welsh.

Morris made his Wales debut in their match against the 1919 New Zealand Army team in Swansea. He gained two further caps, with single appearances in both the 1920 and 1921 Five Nations Championships.

Setting in England, Morris worked in the education department of Middlesex County Council for 28 years.

== See also ==
- List of Wales national rugby union players
