= Tom Coughlan (rugby union) =

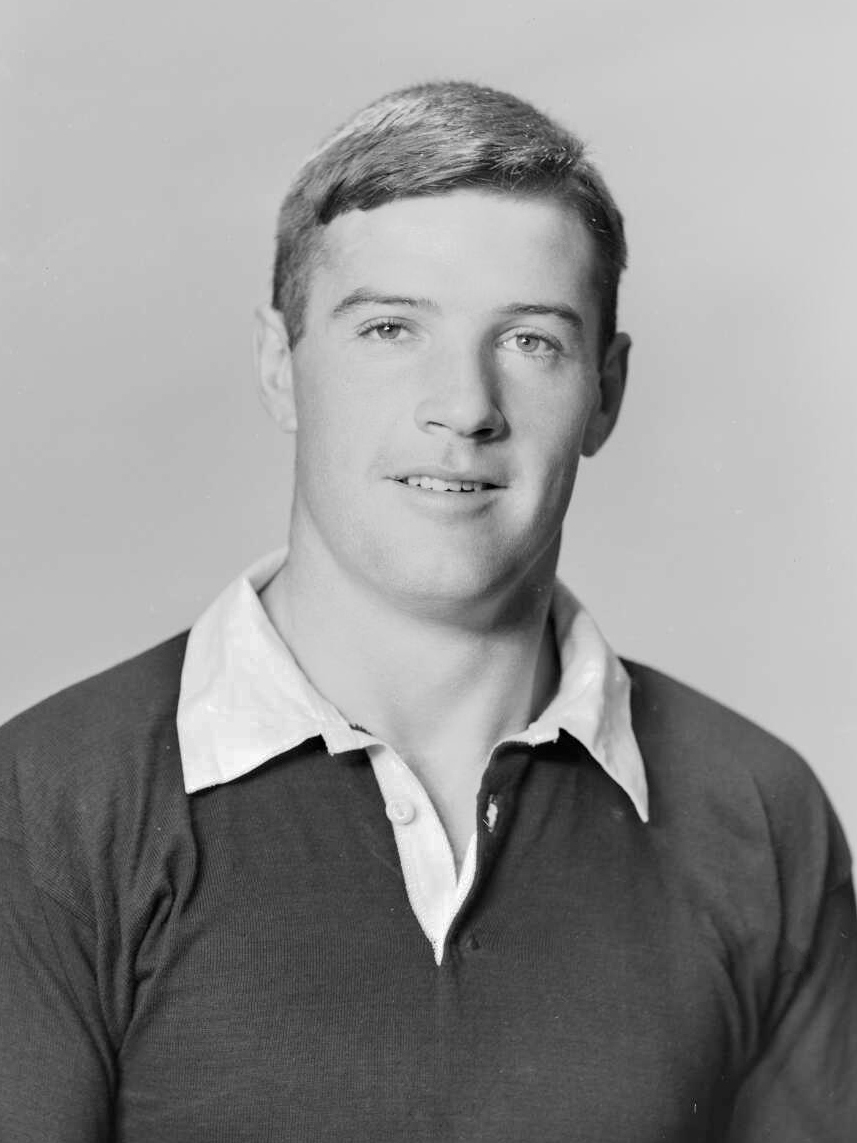
- Coughlan, c. 1959
- Born: Thomas Desmond Coughlan; 30 April 1934 Mosgiel, New Zealand
- Died: 9 November 2017 (aged 83) Christchurch, New Zealand
- Height: 1.85 m (6 ft 1 in)
- Weight: 97 kg (214 lb)
- School: St Kevin's College
- Notable relatives: Tom Lynch (uncle); Tom Lynch (cousin)

Rugby union career
- Position: Flanker
Provincial / State sides
Years	Team	Apps	(Points)
1952–1960	South Canterbury		
1961	King Country	5	
International career
Years	Team	Apps	(Points)
1958	New Zealand	1	(0)

Thomas Desmond Coughlan (30 April 1934 – 9 November 2017) was a New Zealand rugby union player. A flanker, Coughlan represented South Canterbury and, briefly, King Country at a provincial level. He played just one match for the New Zealand national side, the All Blacks: a test against the touring Australian team in 1958. He later was a Mid Canterbury selector in 1973 and 1974.

Born in Mosgiel, Coughlan came from a farming background and was educated at St Kevin's College in Oamaru. He died in Christchurch on 9 November 2017.

His wife, Margaret Jane Coughlan (née Faulks), known as Jane, was a pharmacist and public servant. She served on the Timaru District Council from 1992 to 2013 and was awarded the Queen's Service Medal in the 2014 Queen's Birthday Honours for her services to the community. Jane Coughlan died on 22 May 2024 at Bupa Crofton Downs, Wellington, aged 84.
