= Archibald Durward =

Scottish anatomist

Archibald Durward, MD, FRSE (6 April 1902 – 4 March 1964) was a Scottish anatomist who was Professor of Anatomy at the University of Leeds.

== Early life and education ==
Durward was born on 6 April 1902 in Denny, Stirlingshire, Scotland, the son of The Reverend Peter C Durward MA (1861–1924) and his wife Elizabeth (1865-1937). The family emigrated to New Zealand in 1906, originally to Leeston and then to Lawrence in October 1911. His father deputised for the Moderator at the General Assembly of the Presbyterian Church of New Zealand in 1916.

Durward was educated at Otago Boys' High School. He then studied medicine at the University of Otago, graduating MB in 1926 and gaining his doctorate (MD) in 1930. In the intervening period he acted as house surgeon at Dunedin Hospital.

== Academic career ==
Durward became a lecturer in anatomy at the University of Otago in 1927. In 1931 he returned to the UK, becoming a lecturer in anatomy at University College London. In 1936 he was appointed professor of anatomy at the University of Leeds. He remained at Leeds until 1962, also serving the university as sub-dean of the Faculty of Medicine (1941-43) and as pro-vice-chancellor.

== Honours ==
In 1945 Durward was elected a Fellow of the Royal Society of Edinburgh (FRSE). His proposers were James Couper Brash, William Alexander Bain, Alexander Murray Drennan and Thomas J. Mackie.

== Personal life ==
Durward married Dorothy Westlake (1912-1978) in Chelsea, London in 1934.

== Death ==
Durward died in Kent on 4 March 1964 at the age of 61.

== Selected publications ==
- The Peripheral Nervous System
