= Atholstan Mahoney =

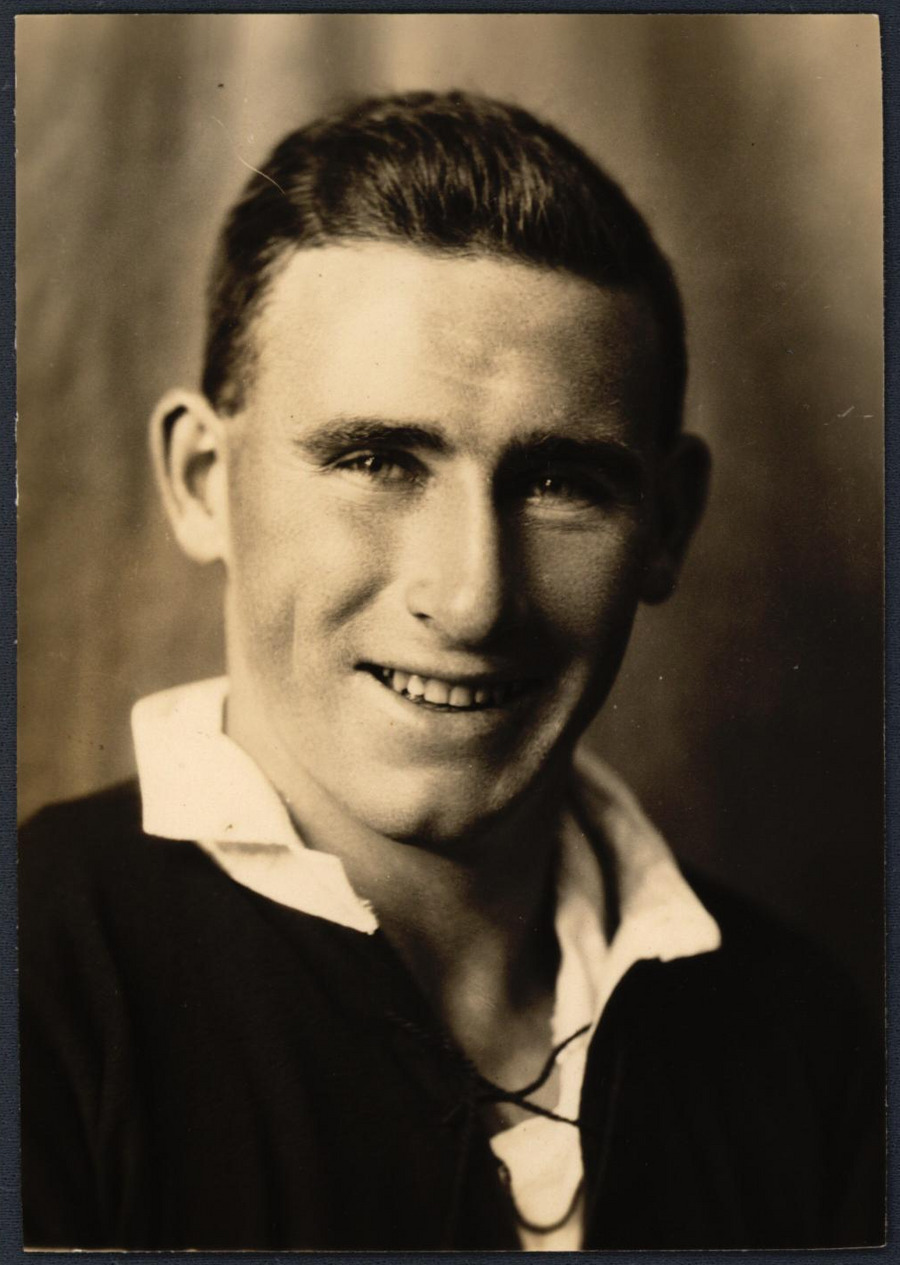
- Mahoney in 1935
- Born: 15 July 1908 Woodville, New Zealand
- Died: 13 July 1979 (aged 70) Pahiatua, New Zealand
- Height: 1.88 m (6 ft 2 in)
- Weight: 91 kg (201 lb)
- School: St. Patrick's College, Wellington

Rugby union career
- Position: Loose forward
Provincial / State sides
Years	Team	Apps	(Points)
1927–39	Bush	36	
International career
Years	Team	Apps	(Points)
1929–36	New Zealand	4	(0)

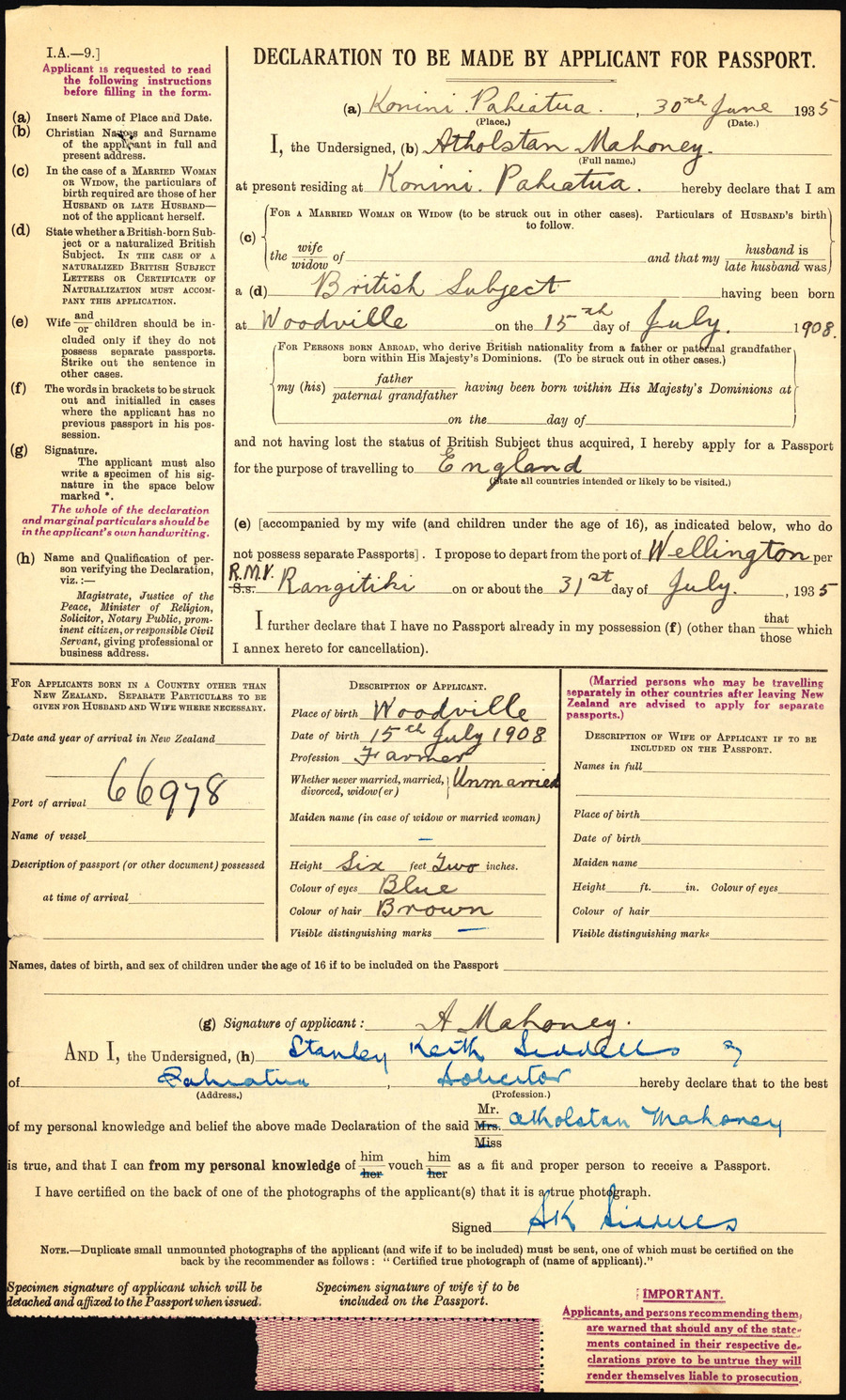
Atholstan Mahoney passport application (1935)

Atholstan Mahoney (15 July 1908 – 13 July 1979) was a New Zealand rugby union player. A loose forward, Mahoney represented Bush at a provincial level, and was a member of the New Zealand national side, the All Blacks, from 1929 to 1936. He played 26 matches for the All Blacks including four internationals.

He served with the 2nd New Zealand Expeditionary Force (2NZEF) during World War II, being taken prisoner of war in 1942.

Mahoney died at Pahiatua on 13 July 1979, and was buried at Pahiatua Mangatainoka Cemetery.
