= Gwyn Francis =

Wales international rugby union footballer

- Born: David Gwyn Francis; 2 February 1896 Gorseinon, Wales
- Died: 7 May 1987 (aged 91) Reading, England
- University: Jesus College, Oxford

Rugby union career
- Position: Lock
Amateur team(s)
Years	Team	Apps	(Points)
- Oxford University RFC
–	Gorseinon RFC		
–	Loughor RFC		
–	Llanelli RFC		
–	London Welsh RFC		
–	Leicester		
–	London Counties		
–	Surrey		
International career
Years	Team	Apps	(Points)
1919–1924	Wales	2	(0)

David Gwyn Francis (2 February 1896 – 7 May 1987) was a Welsh international rugby union player, who played for the Welsh national side twice (in 1919 and 1924).

== Life ==
Francis was educated at Jesus College, Oxford, where he was part of the college rugby team that won the University of Oxford inter-collegiate cup in 1920. Francis also played for the University rugby team, winning his "Blue" in 1919. He won his first cap for Wales in 1919, playing at lock in a friendly against a New Zealand Services XV. In 1921 he took charge of Rugby at Reading School, and in 1924 captained London Welsh RFC and Surrey RFC. He won his second cap in 1924, playing against Scotland in the Home Nations Championship. He was a rugby referee for 28 years, and helped to found the Berkshire Rugby Football Union, serving as chairman for 24 years. A club room at Redingensians R.F.C. (a club that was formed for former pupils of Reading School) is named after Francis, as is a prize awarded by Berkshire rugby referees for club hospitality.
