= Lawrence, New Zealand =

Lawrence
- Town
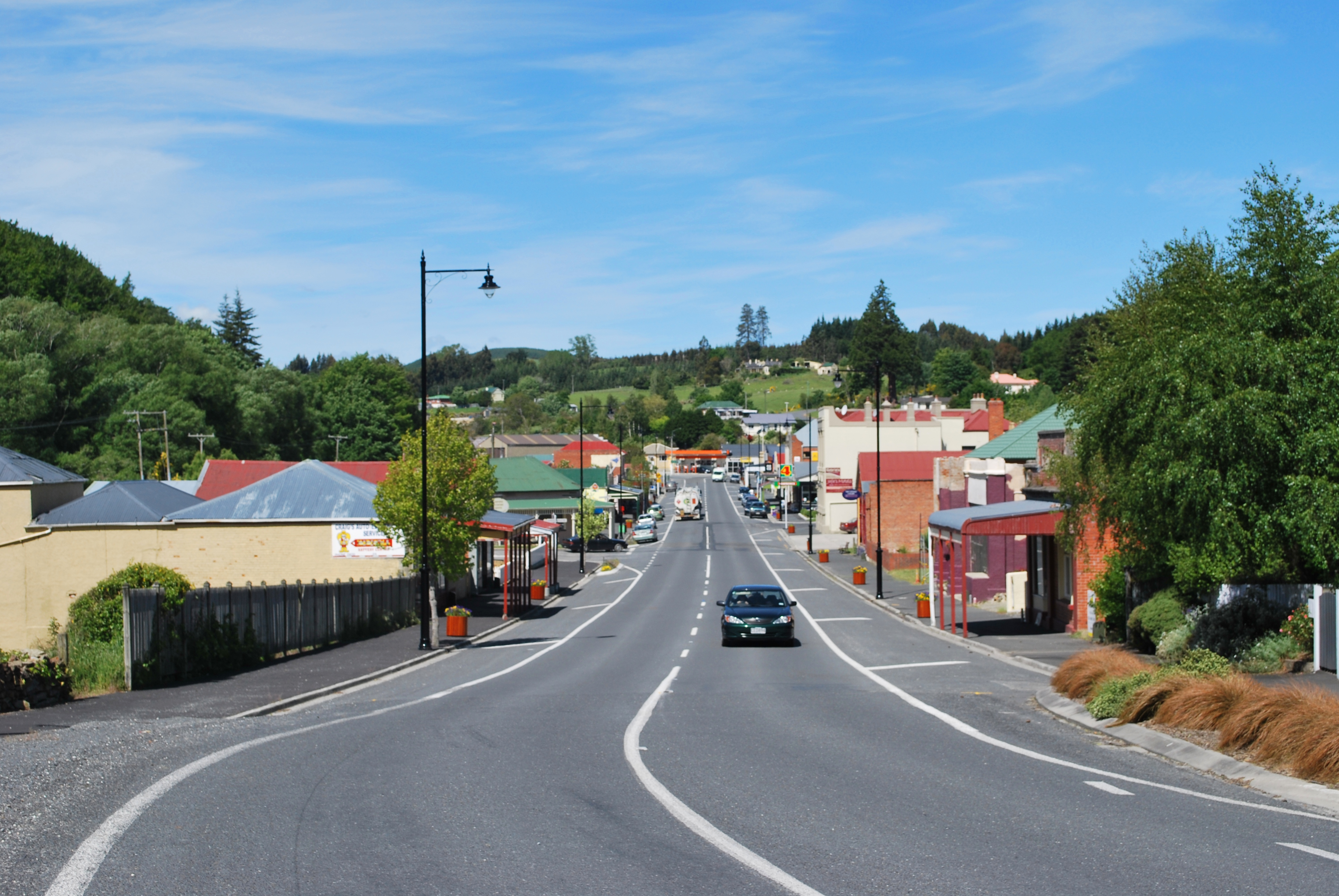
- Ross Place (State Highway 8), the main street of Lawrence
- Interactive map of Lawrence
- Coordinates: 45.913°S 169.689°E
- Country: New Zealand
- Region: Otago
- Territorial authority: Clutha District
- Ward: Lawrence-Tuapeka
- Community: Lawrence-Tuapeka
- Electorates: Taieri; Te Tai Tonga (Māori)

Government
  - Territorial authority: Clutha District Council
  - Regional council: Otago Regional Council
  - Mayor of Clutha: Jock Martin
  - Taieri MP: Ingrid Leary
  - Te Tai Tonga MP: Tākuta Ferris

Area
  - Total: 2.19 km^{2} (0.85 sq mi)

Population (June 2025)
  - Total: 510
  - Density: 230/km^{2} (600/sq mi)
- Time zone: UTC+12 (New Zealand Standard Time)
  - Summer (DST): UTC+13 (New Zealand Daylight Time)
- Postcode: 9532
- Local iwi: Ngāi Tahu
- Website: www.lawrence.nz

Lawrence is a small town in Otago, in New Zealand's South Island. It is located on State Highway 8, the main route from Dunedin to the inland towns of Queenstown and Alexandra. It lies 35 kilometres to the northwest of Milton, 11 kilometres northwest of Waitahuna, and close to the Tuapeka River, a tributary of the Clutha.

== History ==
The discovery of gold at Gabriel's Gully by Gabriel Read in May 1861 led to the Otago gold rush with the population of the gold field rising from almost nothing to around 11,500 within a year, twice that of Dunedin at the time. Gabriel's Gully was quickly dotted with tents and workings, stores and government "buildings".

By December 1861, there were some 14,000 people on the Tuapeka goldfield and it continued to climb and by February 1864 was around 24,000. Around a third of these miners were English, a significant proportion were Irish, while some were European, with others of Chinese origin. The ground under the makeshift township site, was also gold rich. Gradually, the commercial and administrative services for the what became known as the Tuapeka fields were concentrated on non-gold bearing ground 3 kilometres (1.9 mi) away at the entrance to the Gully. A new town was surveyed in 1862 by Robert Grigor and named Tuapeka with sections in the town auctioned on 5 November 1862. By 1864 most people had shifted from the canvas town across the stream to which quickly became the focal point for Otago's goldfield with a bank, hotels, ironmongers, drapers, a watchmaker, bookmaker, newsagent, and various other stores. The town became a municipality in 1866 and was renamed Lawrence in honour of Sir Henry Lawrence, hero of the Lucknow military campaign of 1857. The development of large scale sluicing in the area in the 1870s caused flooding of the low lying areas of the town, which forced government buildings, churches and schools to relocate up the hill to Colonsay Street, while Peel Street became the business street. In mid-1862, it is estimated that twice as many people lived around the banks of the Tuapeka River as did in Dunedin itself. By 1870 the settlement of Chinese miners just outside the town had 300 residents. The Black Horse Brewery, was established in the town in 1866. It closed in 1923. The tune to New Zealand's national anthem was composed in Lawrence by John J. Woods, a Lawrence school teacher.

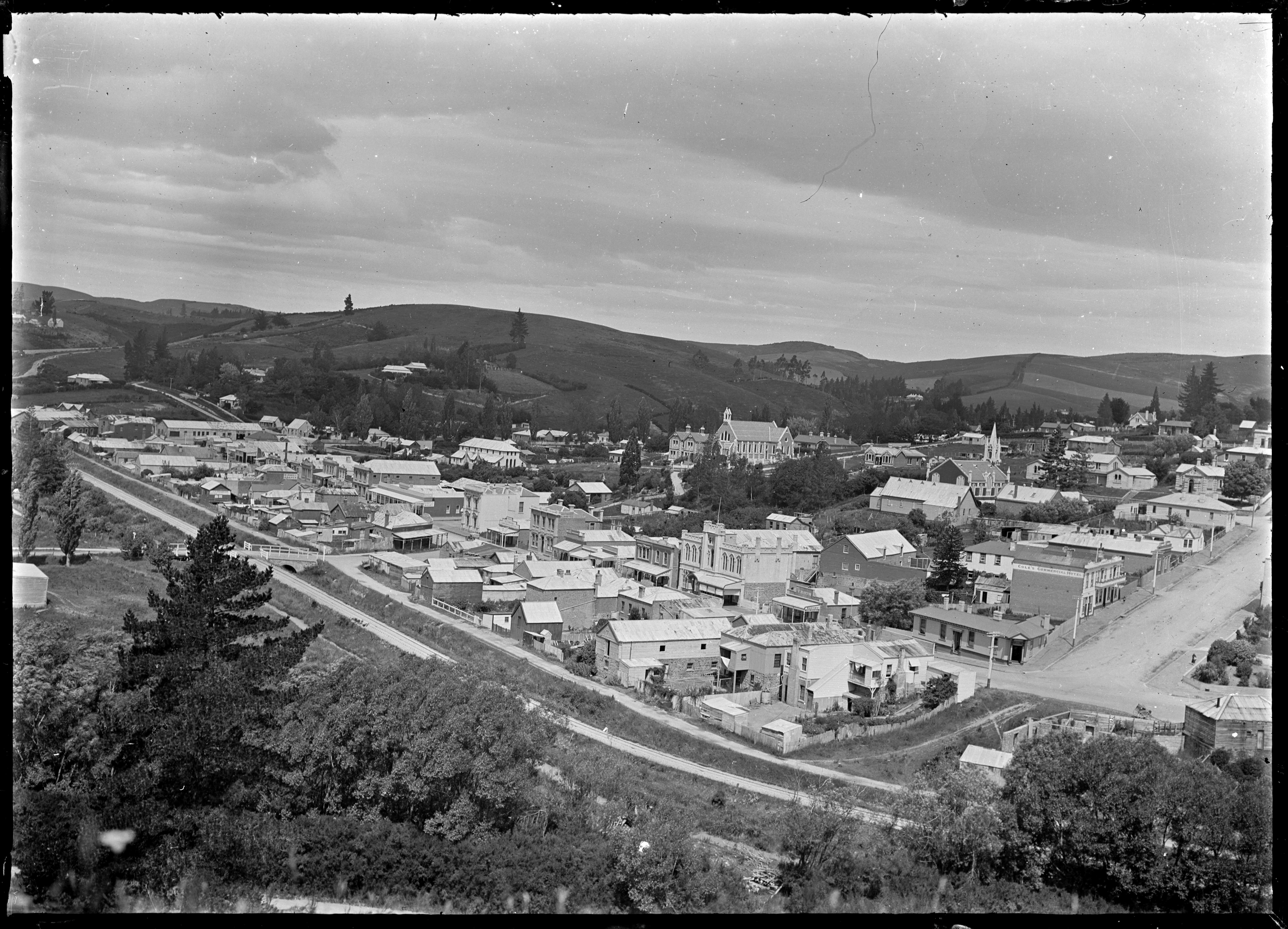
View of Lawrence in 1926

In 1877, a branch line railway was built from the Main South Line to Lawrence, and the town remained the terminus of the line until an extension was built in 1910. Although originally known as the Lawrence Branch, this line ultimately became known as the Roxburgh Branch. The railway closed in 1968 and the town's station has subsequently been demolished, but some relics still remain, including the goods shed.

In 1978, two lions named Sultan and Sonia escaped from a circus in Lawrence. The circus' tranquilliser guns had accidentally been left behind in another town so they could not be shot with tranquillizer darts. They were eventually shot by police but not before one of them had scratched a seven-year-old boy across the face. The lions were stuffed and are now on display at Otago Museum.

In 2011, Lawrence became the first town in New Zealand to offer town-wide free Wi-Fi internet.

The Lawrence Rugby Football Club is based in the township.

Lawrence's sister city is Jacksonville, Oregon.

== Demographics ==
Lawrence is described by Statistics New Zealand as a rural settlement. It covers 2.19 km^{2} (0.85 sq mi), and had an estimated population of 510 as of June 2025, with a population density of 233 people per km^{2}. It is part of the much larger Tuapeka statistical area.

Historical population for Lawrence
Year	Pop.	±% p.a.
2006	429	—
2013	411	−0.61%
2018	447	+1.69%

Lawrence had a population of 447 at the 2018 New Zealand census, an increase of 36 people (8.8%) since the 2013 census, and an increase of 18 people (4.2%) since the 2006 census. There were 210 households, comprising 210 males and 237 females, giving a sex ratio of 0.89 males per female, with 60 people (13.4%) aged under 15 years, 45 (10.1%) aged 15 to 29, 225 (50.3%) aged 30 to 64, and 114 (25.5%) aged 65 or older.

Ethnicities were 89.3% European/Pākehā, 19.5% Māori, and 0.7% Asian. People may identify with more than one ethnicity.

Although some people chose not to answer the census's question about religious affiliation, 53.7% had no religion, 36.9% were Christian, 1.3% had Māori religious beliefs and 0.7% had other religions.

Of those at least 15 years old, 48 (12.4%) people had a bachelor's or higher degree, and 114 (29.5%) people had no formal qualifications. 24 people (6.2%) earned over $70,000 compared to 17.2% nationally. The employment status of those at least 15 was that 156 (40.3%) people were employed full-time, 69 (17.8%) were part-time, and 6 (1.6%) were unemployed.

=== Tuapeka statistical area ===
Tuapeka, which also includes Beaumont and Waitahuna, covers 1,235.19 km^{2} (476.91 sq mi) and had an estimated population of 1,250 as of June 2025, with a population density of 1.0 people per km^{2}.

Historical population for Tuapeka
Year	Pop.	±% p.a.
2006	1,179	—
2013	1,077	−1.28%
2018	1,155	+1.41%

Tuapeka had a population of 1,155 at the 2018 New Zealand census, an increase of 78 people (7.2%) since the 2013 census, and a decrease of 24 people (−2.0%) since the 2006 census. There were 513 households, comprising 576 males and 576 females, giving a sex ratio of 1.0 males per female. The median age was 46.6 years (compared with 37.4 years nationally), with 219 people (19.0%) aged under 15 years, 129 (11.2%) aged 15 to 29, 588 (50.9%) aged 30 to 64, and 219 (19.0%) aged 65 or older.

Ethnicities were 92.7% European/Pākehā, 14.8% Māori, 0.5% Pasifika, 1.6% Asian, and 0.8% other ethnicities. People may identify with more than one ethnicity.

The percentage of people born overseas was 10.1, compared with 27.1% nationally.

Although some people chose not to answer the census's question about religious affiliation, 54.3% had no religion, 34.0% were Christian, 0.5% had Māori religious beliefs and 1.3% had other religions.

Of those at least 15 years old, 129 (13.8%) people had a bachelor's or higher degree, and 225 (24.0%) people had no formal qualifications. The median income was $27,300, compared with $31,800 nationally. 105 people (11.2%) earned over $70,000 compared to 17.2% nationally. The employment status of those at least 15 was that 474 (50.6%) people were employed full-time, 177 (18.9%) were part-time, and 21 (2.2%) were unemployed.

== Attractions / Amenities ==
=== Holy Trinity Anglican church ===
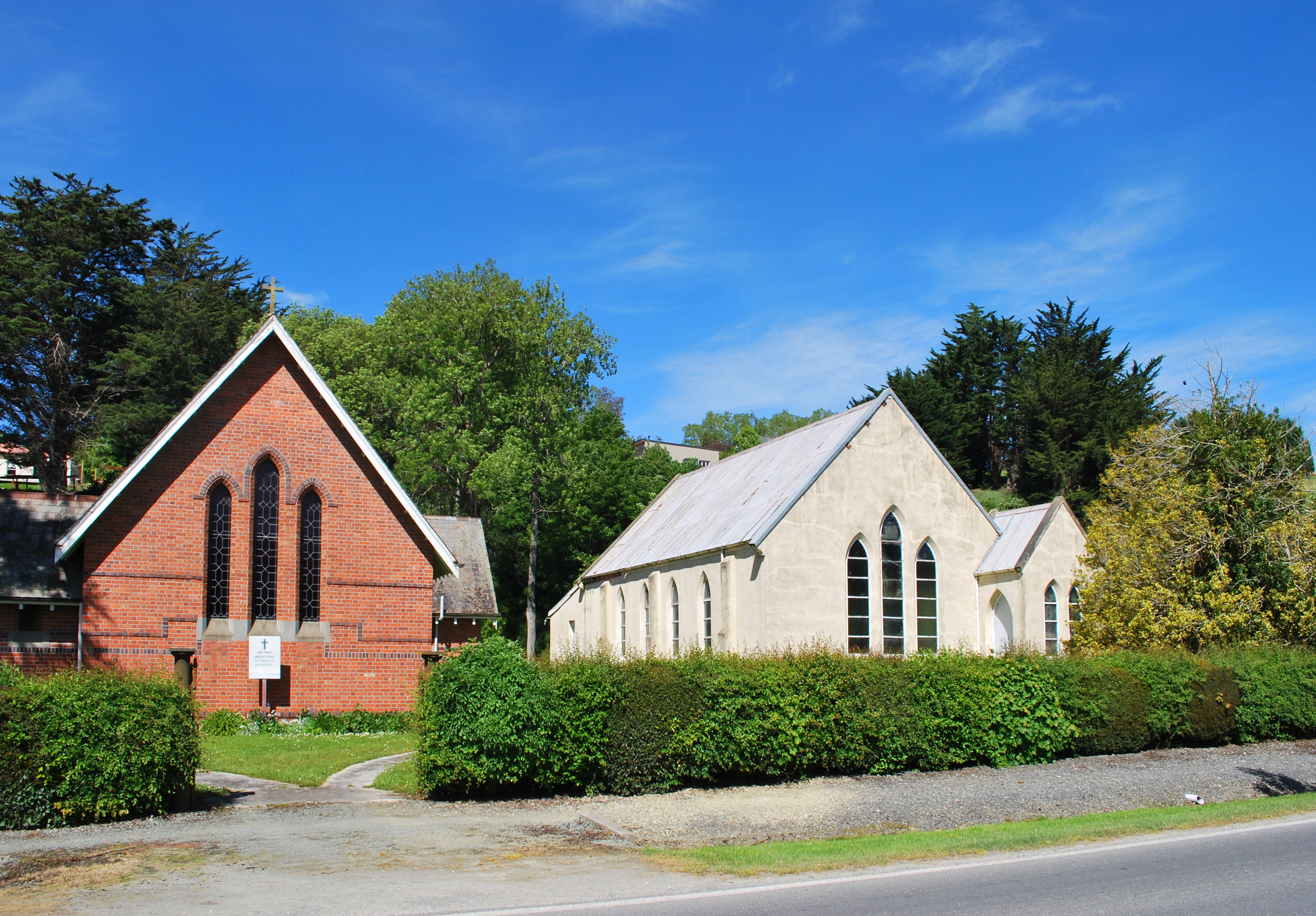
Holy Trinity Anglican Church, Lawrence, in 2011

Moves to establish the first Anglican Church in Lawrence were made in December 1866, but it was not until February 1868 that the first clergyman Rev. H.W. Martin from Victoria, Australia, was appointed. Initially the Anglicans held their services in the Methodist Church before constructing the original church at 9 Whitehaven Street constructed of timber, plainly detailed, with Gothic elements complete with a small belfry at the gable end. It was opened by Bishop-Elect Samuel Nevill in May 1871. The first permanent vicar was the Reverend George P. Beaumont who had arrived in the district in 1870 and remained in that role for another 30 years. A freestanding wooden Gothic-styled belltower was built in the late 1890s beside the church. It was retained when the original church was demolished to make way for the current brick church, which was designed by Invercargill based architect E. R. Wilson.

Its foundation stone was laid in March 1925 and it was consecrated in August of that same year by Bishop Isaac Richards, a previous vicar of the parish. The belltower was restored and rededicated by Bishop Peter Mann in June 1980. It was granted Heritage New Zealand historic place category 2 status in 2005.

The regular congregation was down to less than 10 people, by the time the church held its last service in January 2015. With a ratable value of $90,000 it was sold in 2016 for use as a holiday home.

=== Lawrence Methodist church ===
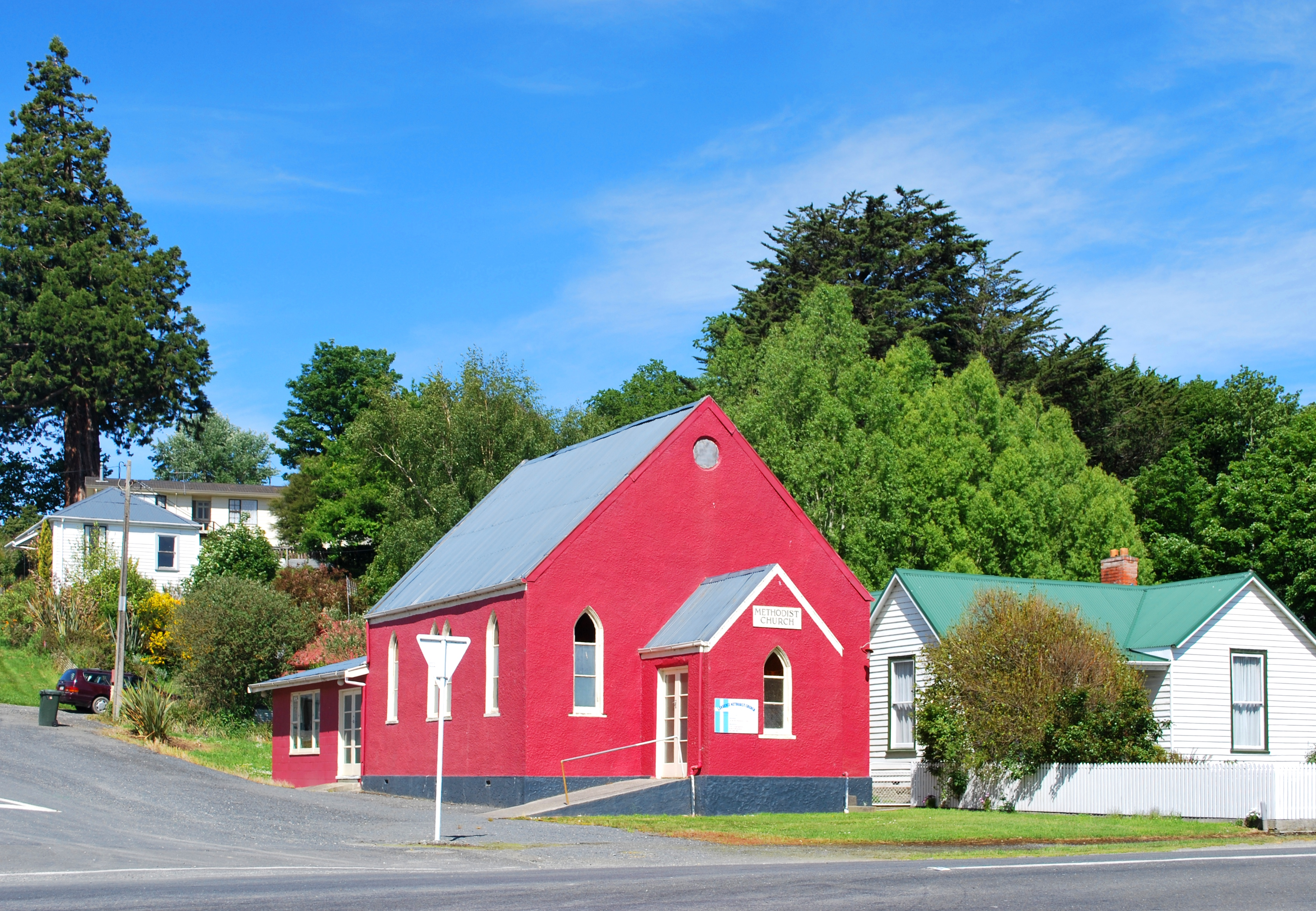
Lawrence Methodist Church in 2011

The first services for Methodists in the district were provided by the Reverend Isaac Harding of Dunedin towards the end of 1862 in two canvas churches, one in Munro's Gully, and another in Gabriel's Gully. Eventually these were replaced by a permanent church at Gabriel's Gully in 1870. In Lawrence itself a Methodist church was constructed of brick on Colonsay Street and opened free of debt in 1865. Unfortunately it was then discovered that due to a surveying error part of the building had been constructed on Catholic land. It was used for eight years and then pulled down. Meanwhile a new site was obtained on the corner of Whitehaven Street, where a 28 feet (8.5 m) by 24 feet (7.3 m) wooden church which cost £320 was constructed, and was officially opened on 14 September 1873, by the Rev. C. W. Rigg. The building is currently occupied by the Boat Shed Antiques shop, and no religious services are held on that site.

=== Lawrence Presbyterian church ===
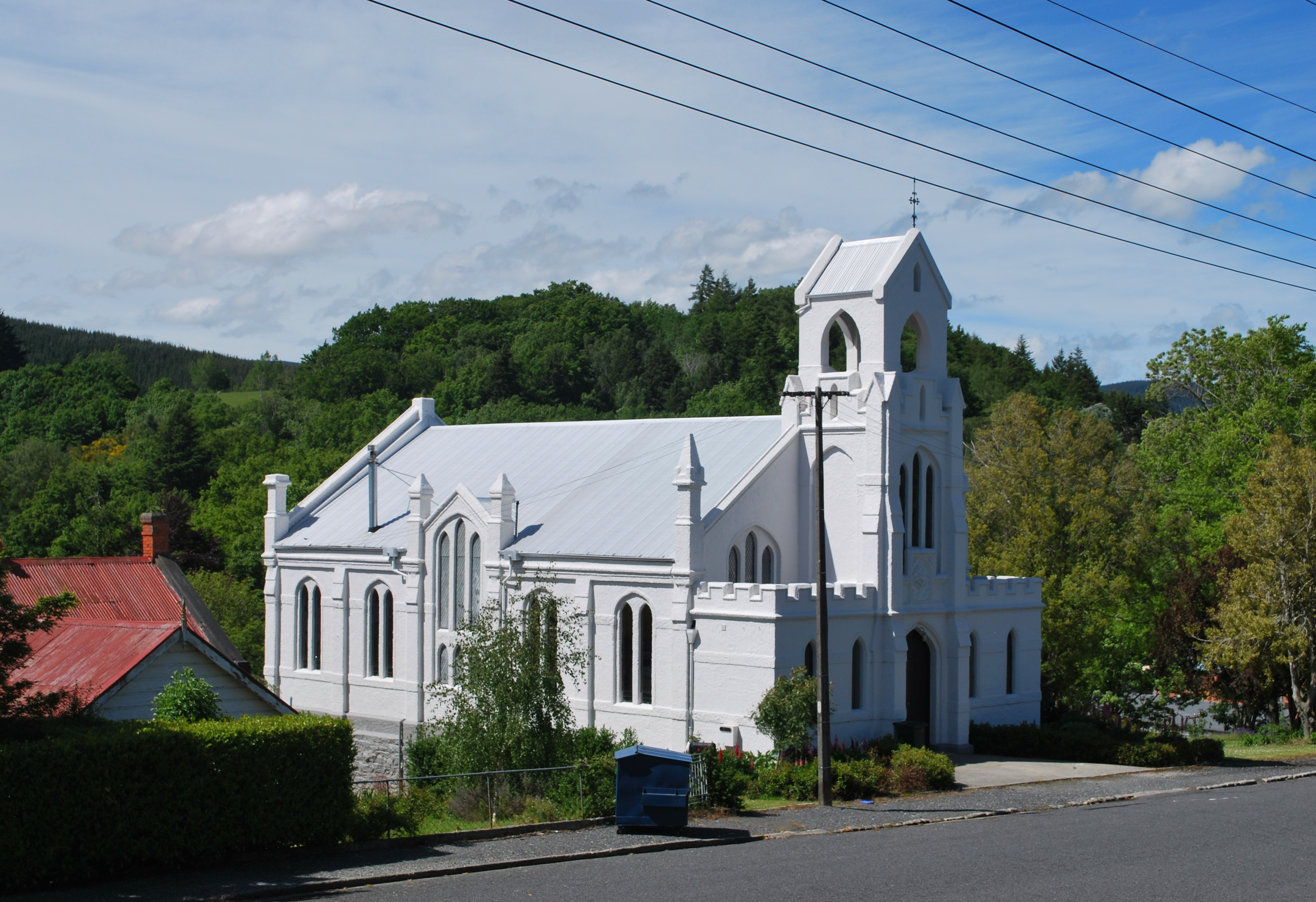
Lawrence Presbyterian Church, in 2011

The first Presbyterian services were held in the district in open air at Gabriel's Gully in July 1861 by layman John Gillies. By 1864 with the support of local congregation and the organisation of a soiree, enough money (including a donation of £50 from Gabriel Read) was raised to allow for the erection of a wooden church building at 7 Colonsay Street. The church's first permanent minister was the Reverend Dr James Copland.

By the mid-1880s it was decided to replace the existing church with a new church on the same section of land. The new building which was opened in September 1886 by D. M. Stuart of Knox Church in Dunedin was designed by Dunedin architect R.A. Lawson. The original church building remained on site and was used as a Sunday School. The new church was constructed of red brick on stone foundations and featured crenellations above the entrance. It was the first church in Otago to have an organ. Up until then a precentor had been used to lead the congregation. Over time the brick exterior was plastered, the spire and pinnacles were removed and a shorter belfry created.

Due to a declining congregation the church was sold around 1994 to a private owner who intended to use it as a holiday home.

In 1998 a fire started by an arson attack severely damaged the building. The building languished for a period, with much local concern expressed about its condition. In 2002 the building was purchased by Jo and Mike Romanes bought the church in 2002, who then spent the next six years, stabilizing the building, installing a new roof and floor before converting it into boutique accommodation.

The building was granted Heritage New Zealand historic place category 2 status in 2004.

=== St Patrick's Church (Roman Catholic) ===
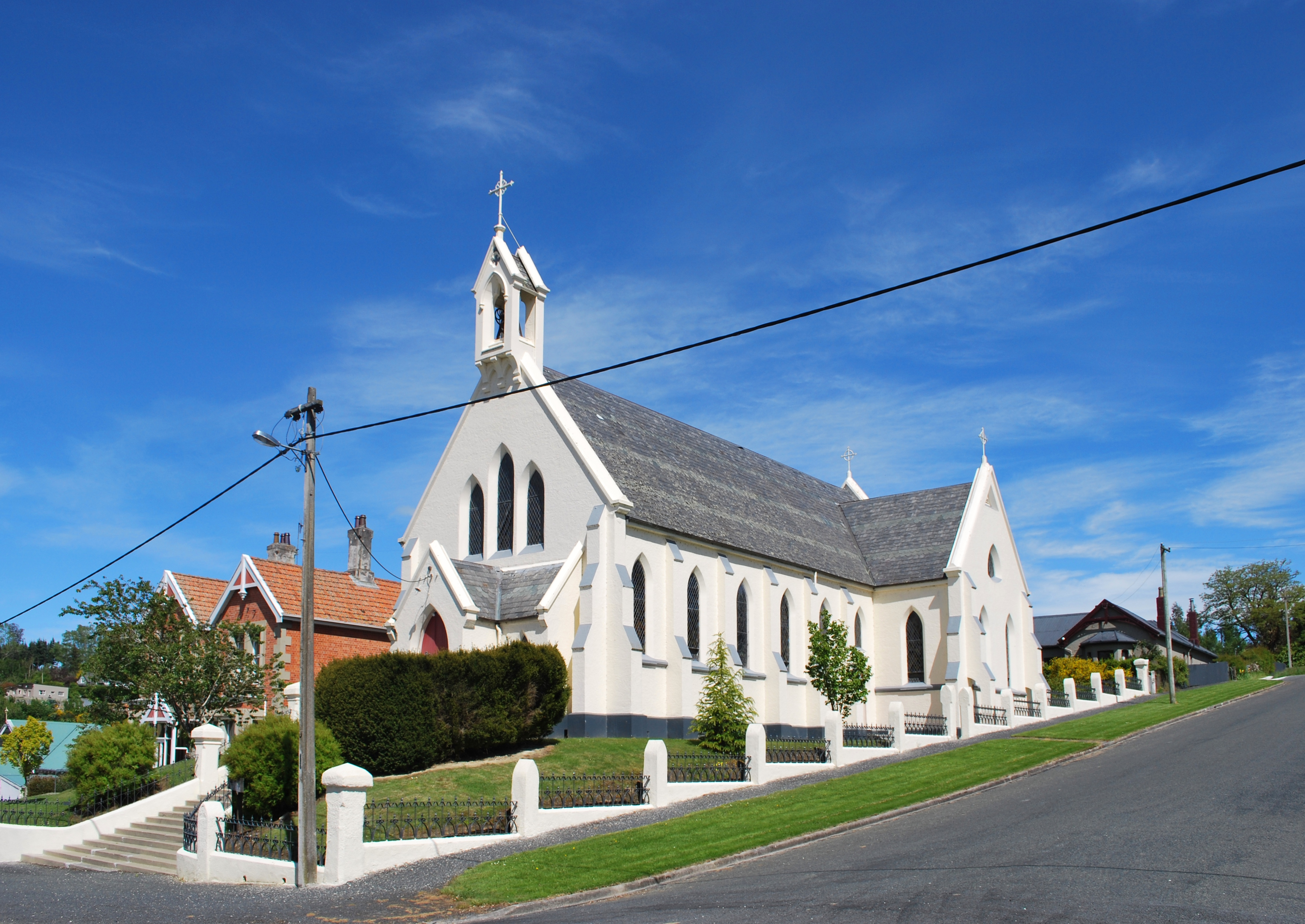
St Patrick's Roman Catholic Church, Lawrence, in 2011

While Otago was established as a Presbyterian settlement the discovery of gold, resulted in miners of all nationalities and creeds emigrating to the province, among them a large number of Irish Catholics. To service their spiritual need, Father Delphin Moreau began visiting the goldfields from Dunedin, from the first weeks of the gold rush. Up until Cobb & Co's established their coach service to the goldfields in October 1861 Moreau's made his visits to Tuapeka on foot, holding Mass there once a month. By 1862 he was travelling to and holding Mass every alternate Sunday in a tent in Gabriel's Gully. In October 1863 a section on the corner of Colonsay and Lancaster Streets house a church and school was donated by local businessman John Donovan. In 1864 Father Joseph Eccuyer was made the first priest permanently resident in Lawrence. A corrugated iron church named St Gabriel's was erected on the site and blessed in November 1864 by Bishop Viard. It was the first Catholic church in Otago.

By the end of May 1871 Father William Larkin had been appointed Parish priest to Tuapeka and he was able to organize the construction of the large wooden Gothic church-school of St Patrick's which opened on 17 March 1872, across the road from the now superseded St Gabriel's. During Larkin's tenure calls intensified for a separate church, distinct from St Patrick's as it was felt that the existing building was essentially a school rather than a church. A building fund for a new church was initiated in 1880 and noted architect, Francis Petre, was selected to design the church, issuing tenders for its construction in November 1890 on the site of the former St Gabriels on the corner of 12 Colonsay Street and Lancaster Street. The contract was awarded on 7 December 1890 to Dunedin based Daniel W. Woods, who had submitted a price of £3000.

By the time the foundation stone was laid by Bishop Patrick Moran on 17 March 1891 the walls were at almost at their full height. The completed brick Gothic church with a belfry of Oamaru stone with seating for about 600 worshippers was officially opened by Bishop Moran on 6 January 1892. The six bay nave of the brick church is 70 feet (21 m) long by 27 feet (8.2 m) wide while the transept was 50 feet (15 m) long by 27 feet (8.2 m) wide. A convent for the Dominican nuns, was later constructed directly to the south of the Church and opened on Sunday 3 February 1893. In 1902, a Presbytery was constructed to the east, adjacent to the church. To protect the decaying bricks and mortar the church was roughcast in 1926. By the 1990s the church needed significant repairs, which were undertaken in 1995. The Presbytery is still owned by the Church, but is now rental accommodation.

== Education ==
Lawrence Area School is a co-educational state composite school for Year 1 to 13 students, with a roll of 127 as of July 2026.

It was a high school until the 1960s, when it became an area school catering to primary pupils as well. It also provides secondary education for students from Waitahuna School.

There were other primary schools previously in Lawrence. Blue Spur School closed some time in the 1930s or 40s; Forsythe School closed in the 1960s; and St Patrick's School closed at the end of 1980, leaving Lawrence Area School as the sole remaining school in Lawrence.

== Notable residents ==
- Archibald Durward FRSE (1902–1964), spent his youth here. He was the son of the local minister Rev Peter C. Durward.
- Trevor Freeman (1916–1943), officer of the Royal New Zealand Air Force during the Second World War
- James Graham (1884–1941), Otago rugby union player and All Black (1913–14).
- Frank Mitchinson (1884–1978), rugby union player.
- Frank Oliver (1948–2014), representative rugby union player and coach, All Black (1976–81), educated at Lawrence District High School.
- Ella Spicer (1876–1958), painter.
- Jack Williams (1918–1975), Member of Parliament.
- David Wilson, the 14th Clerk of the New Zealand House of Representatives (2015–current), spent his childhood in Lawrence.
