= Elton Moncrieff =

- Born: Elton Andrew Moncrieff; 8 June 1972 (age 54) Wellington, New Zealand
- Height: 1.71 m (5 ft 7 1/2 in)
- Weight: 80 kg (12 st 8 lb; 176 lb)
- School: St Patrick's College, Wellington

Rugby union career
- Position: Scrum-half
Senior career
Years	Team	Apps	(Points)
1999-01	Gloucester	22	(518t)
2001-03	Worcester Warriors		
Provincial / State sides
Years	Team	Apps	(Points)
1993-98	Wellington		
Super Rugby
Years	Team	Apps	(Points)
1997	Reds		
1998	Crusaders		
International career
Years	Team	Apps	(Points)
1992–93	New Zealand under-21		
1991	New Zealand under-19		
1990	New Zealand Schoolboys		

Elton Moncrieff (born 8 June 1972) is a New Zealand former rugby union footballer. His regular playing position was scrum-half. He played for Wellington in the NPC and for the Reds and Crusaders in the Super 12 competition. He moved to England in 1999 to play for Gloucester, and later played for Worcester Warriors. He attended St Patrick's College, Wellington.
