= Dick Roberts (rugby union) =

New Zealand rugby union player (1889–1973)

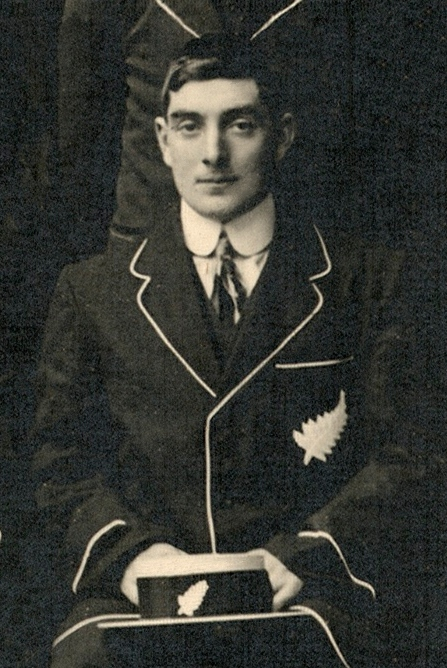
- Roberts in 1913
- Born: Richard William Roberts; 23 January 1889 Manaia, New Zealand
- Died: 8 March 1973 (aged 84) Okaiawa, South Taranaki, New Zealand
- Height: 1.74 m (5 ft 8 1/2 in)
- Weight: 69 kg (152 lb)
- Occupation: Farmer

Rugby union career
- Position: Centre three-quarter
Provincial / State sides
Years	Team	Apps	(Points)
1909–22	Taranaki		
International career
Years	Team	Apps	(Points)
1913–14	New Zealand	5	(29)

Richard William Roberts (23 January 1889 – 8 March 1973) was a New Zealand rugby union player. A centre three-quarter, Roberts represented Taranaki at a provincial level either side of World War I, and was a member of the New Zealand national side, the All Blacks, for their 1913 tour of North America and 1914 tour of Australia, captaining the side on the latter tour. In all, he played 23 matches—nine as captain—for the All Blacks, including five internationals, and scored 102 points (22 tries, 15 conversions and two penalty goals).

In 1918 Roberts was sent overseas as part of the 41st Reinforcements, New Zealand Expeditionary Force, and served as a rifleman with the New Zealand Rifle Brigade. After the conclusion of the war, he was a member of the New Zealand Army rugby team that won the King's Cup and then toured South Africa. During that tour he held the rank of temporary sergeant.
