= John Cuthill =

- Full name: John Elliot Cuthill
- Born: 24 August 1892 Innerleithen, Scotland
- Died: 22 April 1970 (aged 77) Invercargill, New Zealand

Rugby union career
- Position: Centre / Fullback
International career
Years	Team	Apps	(Points)
1913	New Zealand	2	(0)

John Elliot Cuthill (24 August 1892 — 22 April 1970) was a New Zealand rugby union international.

Born in Innerleithen, Scotland, Cuthill moved to New Zealand during his youth and was educated at Otago Boys' High School in Dunedin. He captained Otago University in varsity rugby and in 1913 toured Australia with the New Zealand Universities representative team.

Cuthill, primarily a centre three-quarter, was capped twice by the All Blacks in 1913, debuting against Australia at Athletic Park. He had to play as a stand in full-back and performed well enough that he became the only full-back chosen for the subsequent tour of North America, gaining his second Test cap against the United States in Berkeley.

During World War I, Cuthill served with the Otago Infantry Regiment, receiving wounds in fighting at Gallipoli and later France, which put an end to his rugby career.

== See also ==
- List of New Zealand national rugby union players
