= Evan Rees (rugby) =

Wales international rugby union & league footballer

Personal information
- Full name: Evan Bevan Rees
- Born: 9 August 1896 Cwmavon, or Bridgend, Wales
- Died: fourth ¼ 1978 (aged 82) Ogwr, Wales

Playing information

Rugby union
- Position: Centre
Club
Years	Team	Pld	T	G	FG	P
≤1914–19	Swansea RFC
Representative
Years	Team	Pld	T	G	FG	P
1919	Wales	1	0	0	0	0

Rugby league
Club
Years	Team	Pld	T	G	FG	P
1919–23	Dewsbury	140	26	3		84
1923–26	Batley	55	6	0		18
	Total	195	32	3	0	102

Evan Bevan Rees (9 August 1896 – 1978) was a Welsh rugby union, and professional rugby league footballer who played in the 1910s and 1920s. He played representative level rugby union (RU) for Wales, and at club level for Swansea RFC, as a centre, and club level rugby league (RL) for Dewsbury and Batley.

== Background ==
Evan Rees was born in Cwmavon, or Bridgend, Wales, and he died aged 82 in Ogwr, Wales.

== Playing career ==
=== International honours ===
Evan Rees won a cap for Wales (RU) while at Swansea RFC in 1914 against the New Zealand Army rugby team of 1919 (New Zealand Services).

=== Club career ===
Rees joined Batley from Dewsbury in 1923, and went on to make 55 appearances for the club. During his time at the club, Batley won the 1923–24 League Championship, but did not play in the Championship final.
