= Peter Williams (rugby union, born 1884) =

- Born: 22 April 1884 Dunedin, New Zealand
- Died: 30 August 1976 (aged 92) Mosgiel, New Zealand
- Height: 1.68 m (5 ft 6 in)
- Weight: 73 kg (160 lb)

Rugby union career
- Position: Hooker
Amateur team(s)
Years	Team	Apps	(Points)
- Alhambra
Provincial / State sides
Years	Team	Apps	(Points)
1908–14	Otago	26	
1912–14	South Island	3	
International career
Years	Team	Apps	(Points)
1913	New Zealand	1	(0)

Peter Williams (22 April 1884 – 30 August 1976) was a rugby union player who represented New Zealand nine times, including a single Test match. He played club rugby for Dunedin side Alhambra, and played provincial rugby for Otago between 1908 and 1914. His sole season of international rugby was 1913, when he played in a home Test against Australia before touring North America with the All Blacks – as New Zealand's international team is known – that same year. He was selected for a tour of Australia the following year, but was unavailable and so did not play.

During World War I Williams enlisted as a gunner in the New Zealand Field Artillery in late 1914, but, following illness in Egypt in 1915, he was invalided back to New Zealand and discharged as medically unfit to serve in 1916.

Following the death of Billy Wallace in 1972, Williams held the distinction of being the oldest living All Black. He died in Mosgiel on 30 August 1976, and was buried in Geraldine Cemetery.

Records
Preceded by Billy Wallace	Oldest living All Black; 2 March 1972 – 30 August 1976	Succeeded by Frank Mitchinson
