= Trevor Nicholas (rugby union) =

- Full name: Trevor John Nicholas
- Born: 7 January 1894 Sudbrook, Wales
- Died: 14 March 1979 (aged 85) Minehead, Somerset, England

Rugby union career
- Position: Wing
International career
Years	Team	Apps	(Points)
1919	Wales	1	(0)

Trevor John Nicholas (7 January 1894 — 14 March 1979) was a Welsh international rugby union player.

Born in Sudbrook, Nicholas was a wing three-quarter and didn't start playing rugby until his time serving in the Army. He was recruited by Cardiff and had appeared only twice for the club when he featured for the national team in 1919, playing a match against the New Zealand Army team, for which Wales awarded caps. After getting married later that season, Nicholas retired from first class rugby.

== See also ==
- List of Wales national rugby union players
