= 1921 New South Wales rugby union tour of New Zealand =

Summary
P	W	D	L
Total
10	9	0	1
Test match
1	1	0	1
Opponent
P	W	D	L
New Zealand XV
1	1	0	0

The Queensland Rugby Union had collapsed in 1919 and would not be reborn until 1929 leaving the New South Wales Rugby Union to administer the game in Australia at the national representative level. In 1923 the New South Wales side toured New Zealand In 1986 the Australian Rugby Union decreed the five full-internationals played on the tour as official Test matches.

Previously the All Blacks visited New South Wales in the 1920 tour.

This tour happened while the Springboks were completing their tour in New Zealand. Previously in June, South Africa played three match (unofficial match for the South African Rugby Board.)

== Matches ==
Scores and results list New South Wales' points tally first.

Opposing Team	For	Against	Date	Venue	Status
North Auckland	17	8	10 August 1921	Whangārei	Tour match
Waikato	28	11	13 August 1921	Hamilton	Tour match
Bay of Plenty	20	3	15 August 1921	Rotorua	Tour match
Poverty Bay	26	8	18 August 1921	Gisborne	Tour match
Waiparapa	34	5	20 August 1921	Masterton	Tour match
Marlborough	19	11	24 August 1921	Blenheim	Tour match
Buller	25	11	27 August 1921	Westport	Tour match
West Coast	26	11	31 August 1921	Greymouth	Tour match
New Zealand XV	17	0	3 September 1921	Christchurch	Test match
Wellington	8	16	7 September 1921	Wellington	Tour match
