= Blue Spur, Otago =

Locality in Clutha District, Otago Region, New Zealand

Coordinates: 45°53′00″S 169°40′40″E

Blue Spur is a locality in Otago, New Zealand.

== Description ==
Blue Spur is the area of the historic Otago gold rush town and gold mining fields north of the town of Lawrence in the Clutha District.

== Name ==
The etymology of the term "blue spur" not well known. The gold diggers of the 1860s gold rush went after the gold "on the spur (of the moment)", i.e. in a great hurry/rush. Alluvial gold may often be found close to a layer of blueish clay. Miners frequently talk about mining down to the "blue clay", thus a "blue spur" could somehow elucidate the hasty process of digging for the gold pursuing a blueish layer of clay. Other potential meanings could refer to a blueish colour of mountains ("blue mountains") as it can be spotted in certain light at distant mountains at this location, combined with the geological meaning of a spur, i.e., a secondary mountain ridge. Besides these gold rush-related connotations there is a "blue spur flower" (Plectranthus ciliatus), and the "blue spur" in coats of arms.
