= Frank Mitchinson =

- Born: Frank Edwin Mitchinson; 3 September 1884 Lawrence, New Zealand
- Died: 27 March 1978 (aged 93) Whanganui, New Zealand
- School: Newton School
- Occupation: Farmer

Rugby union career
- Position: Three-quarter
Provincial / State sides
Years	Team	Apps	(Points)
1905–13	Wellington		
1912	Wanganui	2	
International career
Years	Team	Apps	(Points)
1907–13	New Zealand	11	(32)

Frank Edwin Mitchinson (3 September 1884 – 27 March 1978) was a New Zealand rugby union player. A three-quarter, Mitchinson represented Wellington and Wanganui at a provincial level, and was a member of the New Zealand national side, the All Blacks, from 1907 to 1913. He played 31 matches for the All Blacks including 11 internationals, captaining the side in four matches in 1913.

Following the death of Peter Williams in 1976, Mitchinson was the oldest living All Black.

Records
Preceded by Peter Williams	Oldest living All Black; 30 August 1976 – 27 March 1978	Succeeded by Richard Fogarty
