= Laurel McAlister =

New Zealand welfare worker and community leader

Laurel Grace Barker McAlister MBE (20 October 1892 – 25 February 1981) was a New Zealand welfare worker and community leader. She was born in Temuka, New Zealand, on 20 October 1892.

In the 1946 New Year Honours, McAlister was appointed a Member of the Order of the British Empire, in recognition of her service as a member of the Women's War Service Auxiliary. In 1977, she was awarded the Queen Elizabeth II Silver Jubilee Medal.
