= Tom Lynch (rugby union) =

NZ international rugby union player (1892-1950)

- Born: Thomas William Lynch; 26 March 1892 Milton, New Zealand
- Died: 6 May 1950 (aged 58) Clyde, New Zealand
- Height: 1.78 m (5 ft 10 in)
- Weight: 79 kg (174 lb)
- School: St Patrick's College, Wellington
- Notable relative(s): Tom Lynch (son); Tom Coughlan (nephew)

Rugby union career
- Position: Wing three-quarter
Provincial / State sides
Years	Team	Apps	(Points)
1911–14	South Canterbury		
1921–22	Southland	11	
International career
Years	Team	Apps	(Points)
1913–14	New Zealand	4	(12)

Thomas William “Tiger” Lynch (26 March 1892 – 6 May 1950) was a New Zealand rugby union player. A wing three-quarter, Lynch represented South Canterbury and Southland at a provincial level, and was a member of the New Zealand national side, the All Blacks, in 1913 and 1914. He played 23 matches for the All Blacks including four internationals, scoring 37 tries in all.

During World War I, Lynch enlisted in the New Zealand Expeditionary Force in May 1915 and served firstly with the New Zealand Medical Corps on the hospital ship Marama, and later as a private in the Canterbury Infantry Regiment. He was wounded in action, receiving a gunshot wound to the shoulder, on 8 October 1918.

Lynch died at Clyde on 6 May 1950, and was buried at Alexandra Cemetery.
