= Henry Morgan Taylor =

New Zealand sportsman

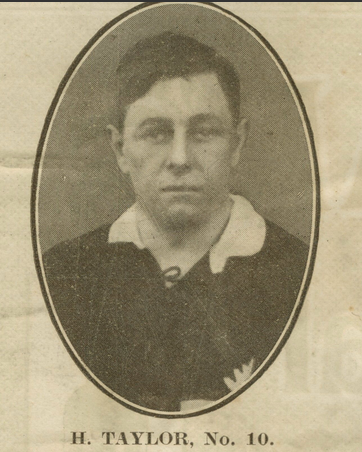
- Born: 5 February 1889 Christchurch, New Zealand
- Died: 20 June 1955 (aged 66) Christchurch, New Zealand
- Height: 5 ft 7 in (170 cm)
- Weight: 11 st (154 lb; 70 kg)

Rugby union career
- Position: Halfback
Amateur team(s)
Years	Team	Apps	(Points)
- Christchurch HSOB
Provincial / State sides
Years	Team	Apps	(Points)
1910–14	Canterbury	21	
1913–14	South Island	2	
International career
Years	Team	Apps	(Points)
1913–14	New Zealand	23	(60)

Henry Morgan Taylor (5 February 1889 – 20 June 1955) was a New Zealand sportsman who played rugby union for New Zealand and cricket for Canterbury.

A skilful half-back, Taylor played for the All Blacks – New Zealand's national rugby union team – in 1913 and 1914. He toured North America with the All Blacks in 1913, and Australia in 1914, when he scored 15 tries when the All Blacks won all 10 of their matches.

Taylor played as a wicket-keeper in three matches of first-class cricket for Canterbury in 1920 and 1921. He scored 40 runs, with a top score of 32. In 1926 he was one of nine directors of a company formed to finance the New Zealand team's first tour of England in 1927.

Taylor was born in Christchurch and attended Christchurch Boys' High School. He was the managing director of Taylor's, a plumbing supplies company in Christchurch. He and his wife Gwen had a son and a daughter.
