= Mick Cain =

New Zealand rugby union player

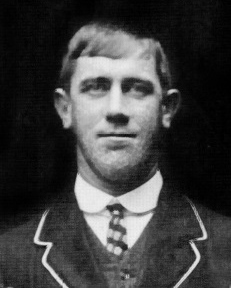
- Cain in 1913
- Born: Michael Cain; 7 July 1885 Waitara, New Zealand
- Died: 27 August 1951 (aged 66) New Plymouth, New Zealand
- Occupation: Labourer

Rugby union career
- Position: Hooker
Provincial / State sides
Years	Team	Apps	(Points)
1908–14, 20–21	Taranaki		
International career
Years	Team	Apps	(Points)
1913–14	New Zealand	4	(0)

Michael Cain (7 July 1885 – 27 August 1951) was a New Zealand rugby union player. A hooker, Cain represented Taranaki at a provincial level, and was a member of the New Zealand national side, the All Blacks, from 1913 to 1914. He played 24 matches for the All Blacks including four internationals. He was selected again for the All Blacks team to tour Australia in 1920, but withdrew.

During World War I, Cain served as a Sergeant with the Otago Regiment and saw action in France. Following the end of the war, he played for the New Zealand Services rugby team in both the United Kingdom and South Africa.

Cain died in New Plymouth in 1951, and he was buried in Waitara Cemetery.
