= Eric Cockroft =

- Born: Eric Arthur Percy Cockroft; 10 September 1890 Clinton, New Zealand
- Died: 2 April 1973 (aged 82) Ashburton, New Zealand
- School: Southland Boys' High School
- University: University of Otago
- Notable relative: Sam Cockroft (uncle)
- Occupation: School teacher

Rugby union career
- Position(s): Wing; Full-back
Provincial / State sides
Years	Team	Apps	(Points)
- Otago
-	South Canterbury		
International career
Years	Team	Apps	(Points)
1913–14	New Zealand	3	(0)

Eric Arthur Percy Cockroft (10 September 1890 – 2 April 1973) was a New Zealand rugby union player. A wing and full-back, Cockroft represented Otago and South Canterbury at a provincial level, and was a member of the New Zealand national side, the All Blacks, in 1913 and 1914. He played seven matches for the All Blacks including three internationals.
