= Toby Murray =

- Born: Harold Vivian Murray; 9 February 1888 Lincoln, New Zealand
- Died: 4 July 1971 (aged 83) Amberley, New Zealand
- Height: 1.78 m (5 ft 10 in)
- Weight: 81 kg (179 lb)
- School: Christ's College
- Occupation(s): Farmer, sheep breeder

Rugby union career
- Position: Wing-forward
Provincial / State sides
Years	Team	Apps	(Points)
1909–14	Canterbury		
International career
Years	Team	Apps	(Points)
1913–14	New Zealand	4	(9)

Harold Vivian "Toby" Murray (9 February 1888 – 4 July 1971) was a New Zealand rugby union player. Predominantly a wing-forward, Murray represented Canterbury at a provincial level, and was a member of the New Zealand national side, the All Blacks, in 1913 and 1914. He played 22 matches for the All Blacks including four internationals, scoring 12 tries in all.

Murray enlisted for the New Zealand Expeditionary Force in August 1916, and served in the 21st Specialist Company, Machine-Gun Section. He saw action in France, and received a shrapnel wound to the right thigh in April 1918. Following the end of the war, Murray played three matches for the New Zealand Services team in the King's Cup in 1919. During World War II, Murray was commissioned as a lieutenant in the Home Guard in 1941, and was posted to the reserve of officers at the beginning of 1944.

Murray farmed and bred sheep in North Canterbury, where he was active in the local agricultural and pastoral association, and served as a member of the North Canterbury Electric Power Board. He died at Amberley on 4 July 1971. The athlete and architect Henry Murray (1886–1943) was his cousin.
