= Jock McKenzie (rugby union, born 1892) =

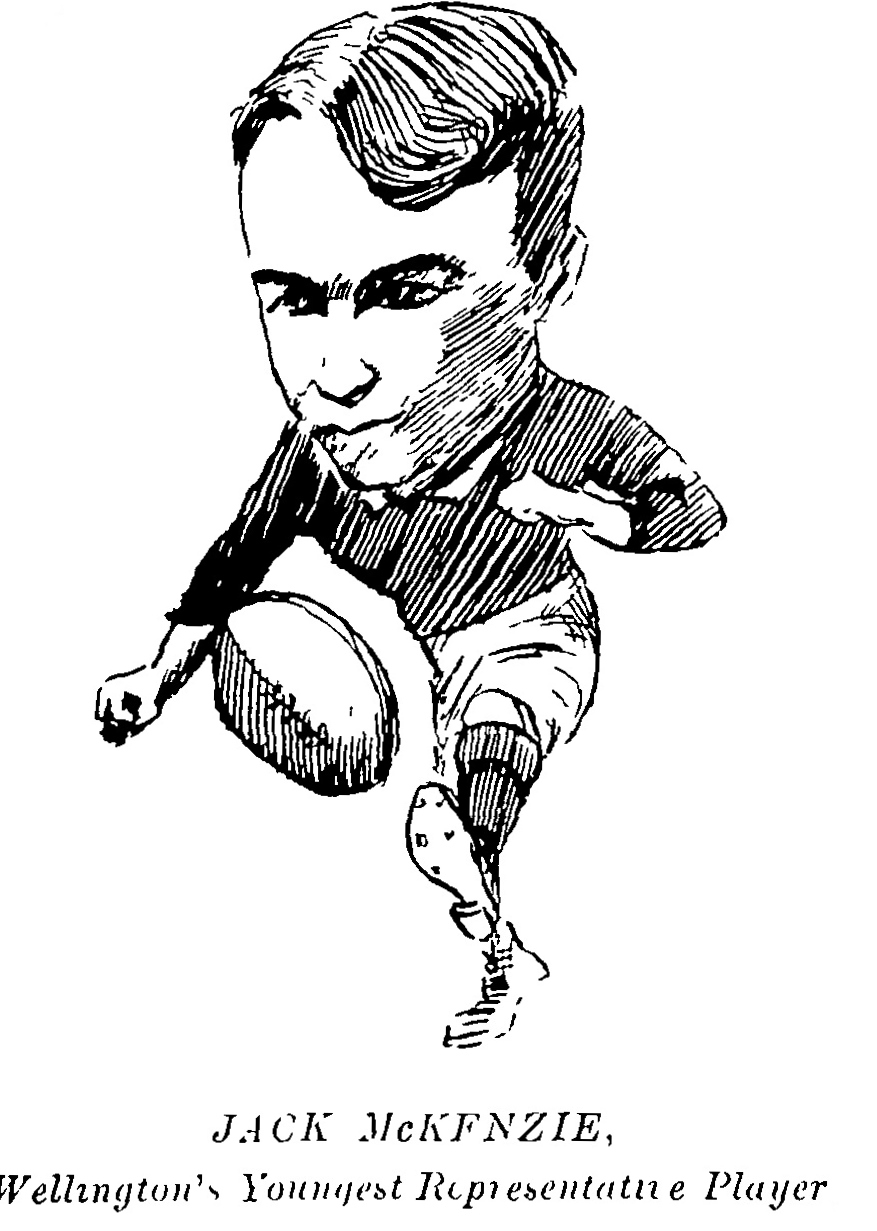
- A caricature of McKenzie from 1909
- Born: Richard John McKenzie; 15 March 1892 Lyttelton, New Zealand
- Died: 25 September 1968 (aged 76) Mount Maunganui, New Zealand
- School: St. Patrick's College, Wellington

Rugby union career
- Position: Second five-eighth
Amateur team(s)
Years	Team	Apps	(Points)
- Petone
Provincial / State sides
Years	Team	Apps	(Points)
1909–13	Wellington	24	
1914	Auckland	2	
1912–14	North Island	3	
International career
Years	Team	Apps	(Points)
1913–14	New Zealand	20	(57)

Richard John McKenzie (15 March 1892 – 25 September 1968), known as Jock, was a rugby union footballer who played for the New Zealand national team, commonly called the All Blacks. He mostly played at second five-eighth, and made 20 appearances for New Zealand between 1913 and 1914. He played most of his provincial rugby for Wellingtong, but played two matches for Auckland in 1914 before the outbreak of the First World War. Most New Zealand rugby, including international matches, were suspended for the duration of the war. McKenzie sustained injuries during the war, leading to his retirement from playing.

== Sources ==
- Knight, Lindsay. "Jock McKenzie". allblacks.com. New Zealand Rugby Museum.
- McCarthy, Winston (1968). Haka! The All Blacks Story. London: Pelham Books.
- Swan, Arthur C.; Jackson, Gordon F. W. (1952). Wellington's Rugby History 1870 – 1950. Wellington, New Zealand: A. H. & A. W. Reed.
