= James Graham (rugby union) =

- Born: James Buchan Graham; 23 April 1884 Dunedin, New Zealand
- Died: 15 May 1941 (aged 57) Auckland, New Zealand
- School: Lawrence High School

Rugby union career
- Position: Loose forward
Provincial / State sides
Years	Team	Apps	(Points)
1908–1915	Otago	21	
International career
Years	Team	Apps	(Points)
1913–1914	New Zealand	3	(10)

James Buchan Graham (23 April 1884 – 15 May 1941) was a New Zealand rugby union player. A loose forward, Graham represented Otago at a provincial level, and was a member of the New Zealand national side, the All Blacks, in 1913 and 1914. He played 16 matches for the All Blacks including three internationals.
