= Alex Bruce (rugby union) =

New Zealand rugby union player and cricketer

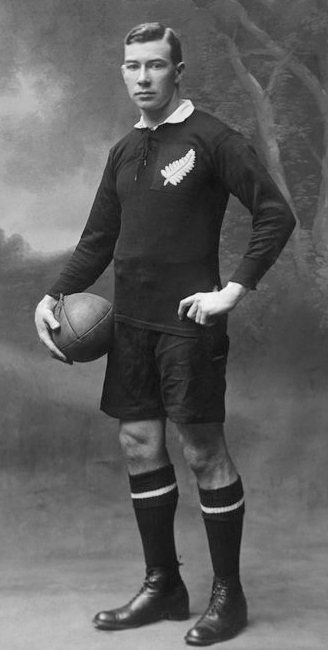
- Born: John Alexander Bruce; 11 November 1887 Wellington, New Zealand
- Died: 20 October 1970 (aged 82) Wellington, New Zealand
- Height: 1.82 m (6 ft 0 in)
- Weight: 89 kg (196 lb)
- School: Te Aro School

Rugby union career
- Position: Loose forward
Provincial / State sides
Years	Team	Apps	(Points)
1909–10, 1921	Wellington		
1911–15	Auckland		
International career
Years	Team	Apps	(Points)
1913–14	New Zealand	2	(0)

John Alexander Bruce (11 November 1887 – 20 October 1970) was a New Zealand rugby union player and cricketer.

== Rugby union ==
A loose forward, Bruce represented Wellington and Auckland at a provincial level, and was a member of the New Zealand national side, the All Blacks, in 1913 and 1914. He played 10 matches for the All Blacks including two internationals. At the end of World War I, Bruce played for the New Zealand Services team in Britain and South Africa.

== Cricket ==
Bruce was a middle-order batsmen who made his first-class debut for Wellington in the 1907/08 season. In all, he played eight first-class matches for Wellington between 1907 and 1923, with an hiatus of almost 12 years between appearances in 1909 and 1921. He scored 325 runs at an average of 32.50, and a high score of 107.
