= Albert Downing =

New Zealand rugby union footballer

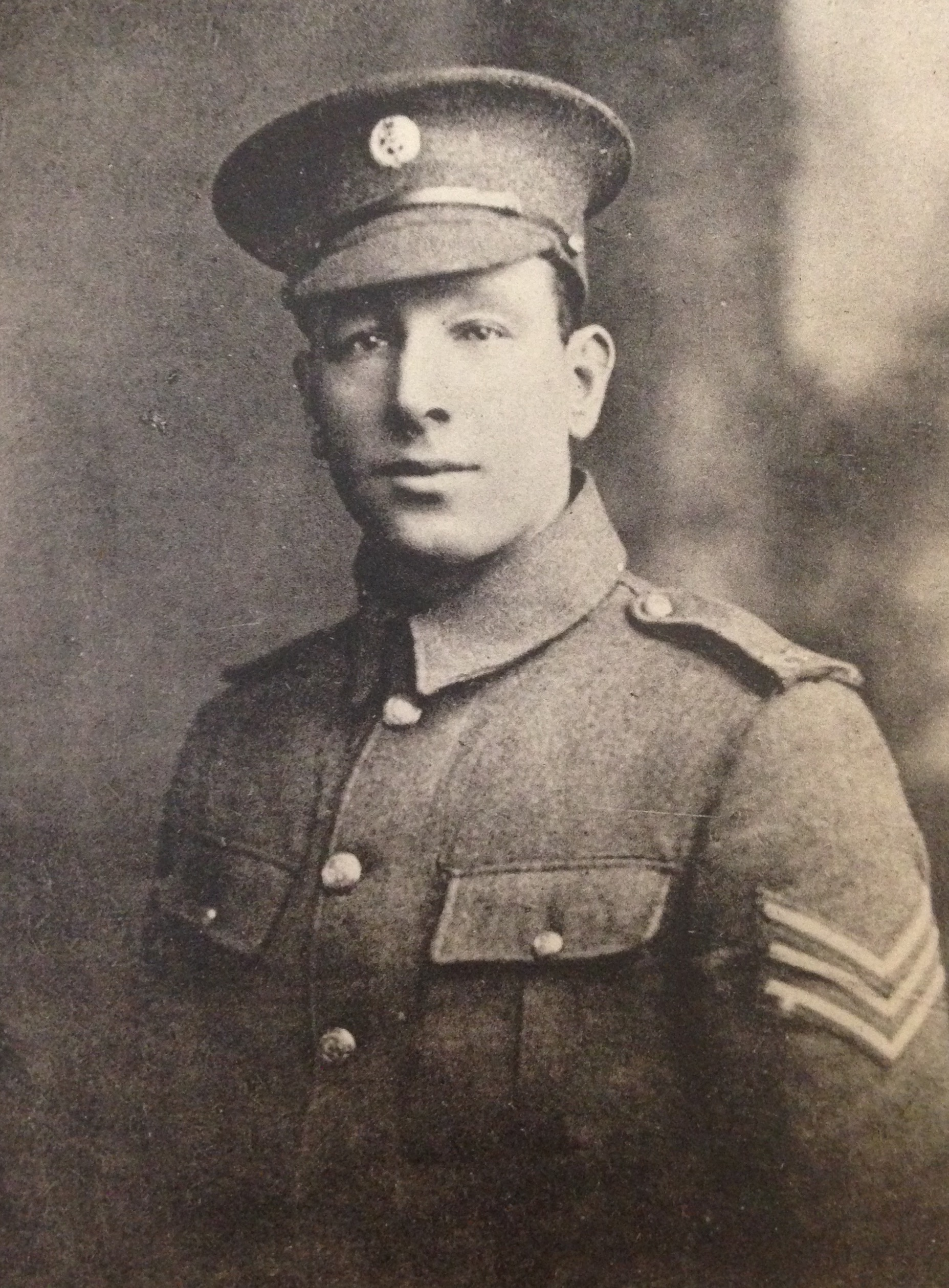
- Born: Albert Joseph Downing; 12 July 1886 Port Ahuriri, Napier, New Zealand
- Died: 8 August 1915 (aged 29) Chunuk Bair, Gallipoli, Ottoman Turkey
- Height: 1.83 m (6 ft 0 in)
- Weight: 89 kg (14 st 0 lb)
- School: Napier Boys' High

Rugby union career
- Position: Lock
Senior career
Years	Team	Apps	(Points)
1909–1911	Napier Marist		
1913–1914	Auckland Marist		
1915	Trentham Military Forces		
Provincial / State sides
Years	Team	Apps	(Points)
1909–1910	Hawke's Bay		
1911–1912	North Island Country		
1913–1914	Auckland		
International career
Years	Team	Apps	(Points)
1913–1914	New Zealand	26	(21)
- Military career
- Allegiance: United Kingdom
- Branch: New Zealand Army
- Service years: 1911–1915
- Rank: Sergeant
- Units: Fifth Reinforcements (Wellington Battalion)
- Conflicts: World War I; Gallipoli campaign; Battle of Chunuk Bair †

Albert "Doolan" Joseph Downing (12 July 1886 – 8 August 1915) was a New Zealand international rugby union player, capped 26 times at lock between 1913 and 1914. He was born in Napier, and began his playing career for Napier Marist in 1909, from which he was selected for Hawke's Bay and for the North Island. He moved at the end of 1912 to Auckland and there joined Auckland Marist, where he was the club's first All Black, playing his debut match against a touring Australian team in 1913. He was selected for the highly successful tour of North America in 1913, playing in 14 of the 16 matches and scoring 6 tries.

While the All Blacks were on a tour of Australia in 1914, the British Empire declared war on Germany and the team collectively decided to enlist. Three of them were killed, Downing the first of the All Blacks in World War I. After enlisting in early 1915, he took part in the Battle of Chunuk Bair, part of the Gallipoli Campaign, and was killed on 8 August. Henry Dewar, a teammate from the US tour, died the following day at Anzac Cove.

== Early life ==
Albert Downing was born on 12 July 1886 in Port Ahuriri, Napier, New Zealand, the eldest son of Mr and Mrs John Downing. He attended Napier Boys' High School until 1904. He was a farmer before joining Barry Brothers, carriers and coal merchants, choosing to work as a carter outdoors, rather than join the clerical staff. Later, he worked as a storeman for the Ellison and Duncan Company.

== Rugby career ==
Downing's rugby career, playing at lock, started with the Napier Old Boys Rugby Club and then Napier Marist Rugby Club; he represented Hawke's Bay from 1909 to 1912. In 1911, he was selected for a North Island Country team, playing all games of a five match tour. The tour was part of a scheme by the New Zealand Rugby Union to discover talent, which brought Downing to the selectors' attention. The North Island team played four games, against Auckland, Taranaki Union, Wanganui and Wellington, between 29 July and 9 August, and played a final match against the South Island on 12 August. Reports from the tour show Downing was very involved in the games, scoring a try against Wanganui for a 13–0 victory, and nearly scoring in a close game against Auckland, which resulted in an 8–8 draw. The North versus South match, which the North won 18–6, was described in the press as lacking in quality: it was an "uninteresting match", and "play was crude and poor and lacked vigour". Downing stood out: "The only member of either team who could be said to have played up to inter-island form was Downing – a fine forward in the North Island team."

The following year, Downing's name was put forward by Hawke's Bay to play for the North Island in the annual Inter-Island match and he made selection. The North beat the South 12–8 in a closely contested, entertaining game in front of a full capacity crowd. The Northern forwards in general played a good game; it was suggested that Downing's passing back from the lineout to the halfback was something that other forwards might consider imitating. A tour with the North Island Country team followed, in which Downing played all four games. The last, against South Island Country in Wellington on 4 August, had to be stopped at half time due to the condition of the match ground, and the North won 14–3. His Hawke's Bay and North Island Country teammate Norman McKenzie described him as "an outstanding line-out forward with a wonderful pair of hands".

=== Auckland and the All Blacks ===
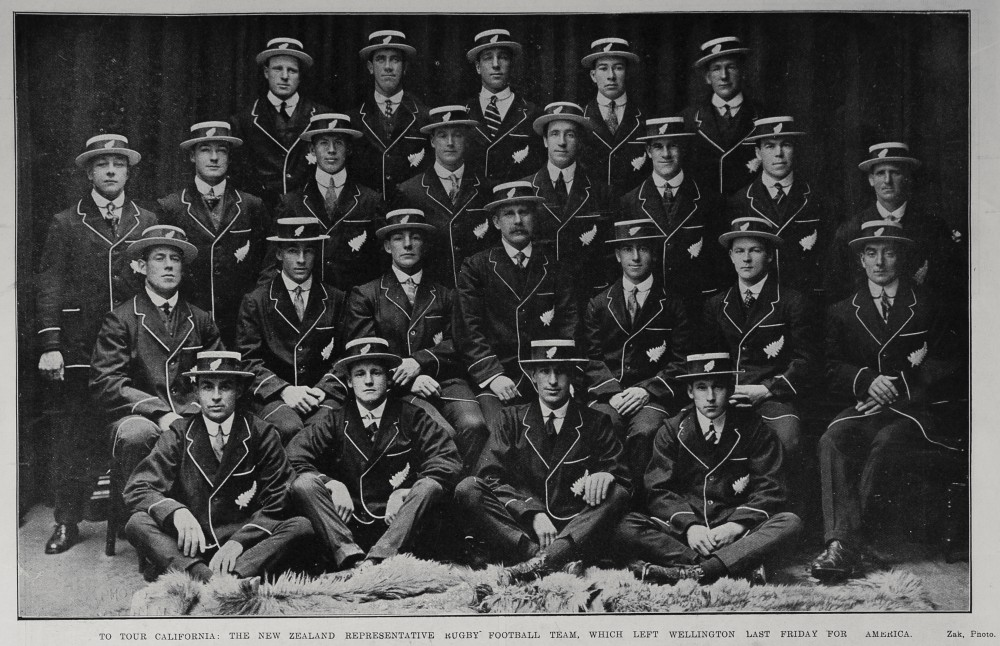
The New Zealand team before their departure to North America in 1913. Downing is standing in the middle of the back row.

Downing relocated to Auckland at the end of 1912 and was recruited by Auckland Marists on the strength of his playing and the links with the Napier Marists. He was the club's first All Black, joined shortly after by Jim "Buster" Barrett. Downing's debut match was against Australia in Wellington on 6 September, which the All Blacks won easily 30–6, bettering Australia "in every respect".

He was subsequently selected for the tour of North America the same year. On 10 September, the eve of departure, Wellington took on the All Blacks in a "thrilling" game which saw the visitors nearly defeated. With the wind behind them in the first half, the All Blacks gained a 13-point lead; but in the second half, Wellington came back strongly; and with a drop-goal in the final three minutes, closed the lead to just one point, 19–18. There was strong back play on both sides; amongst the forwards, one player from each side received special mention in the press: Downing for the All Blacks, Miller for Wellington.

It is possible that Downing might not have been selected for the tour had he not moved to Auckland. As it was, he played in 14 of the 16 matches, and contributed 6 tries for 18 points towards a total tally of 610 points. There was little interest in the American press about the tour. A single short paragraph in the New York Tribune reports on the 51–3 defeat of the All America team on 15 November. In New Zealand, meanwhile, detailed match reports were coming in, and many of these were full of praise for Downing. Of all the players in the USA match, four would die in the Great War: Deke Gard, the USA captain (died 29 September 1918); and three All Blacks: Henry Dewar, George Sellars and Downing himself.

In 1914, Downing was again selected for the Inter-Island match in Wellington on 9 June, which the South won 8–0. Later in the year, four of Downing's Marist teammates were with him in the All Black side selected to tour Australia: Barrett, five eighths Jock McKenzie, who had transferred from Wellington, and fullback Jack O'Brien, a founding member of the club. The All Blacks played Wellington again on the day before leaving for Australia, this time losing 19–14, Downing contributing a try. Downing played in 10 of the 11 matches, including the 3 tests, and was praised for his line-out ability. In the first test on 18 July, he was, according to The Star, "easily the best forward in the team", and after the second test, The Southland Times opined that "it is quite possible that before he leaves the lengthy Aucklander may prove himself to be included in the star category of New Zealand forwards."

In an obituary, Downing was described as "big, strong, fast, brainy, clever with hands and feet, dashing, and resourceful." He was best known for his work in the line-out and in the loose, equally good in attack as in defence. He played hard but clean. Such was his devotion to rugby that Downing had a tattoo on his left forearm of the Ranfurly Shield.

=== International appearances ===
Opposition	Score	Result	Date	Venue	Ref(s)
Australia	30–5	Win	6 September 1913	Wellington, New Zealand	
United States	3–51	Win	15 November 1913	Berkeley, California	
Australia	0–5	Win	18 July 1914	Sydney	
Australia	0–17	Win	1 August 1914	Brisbane, Australia	
Australia	7–22	Win	15 August 1914	Sydney	

== Military career ==
During the All Black tour of Australia, in the game against Metropolitan Union in Sydney on 5 August 1914, the news was posted on the scoreboard that the British Empire – and therefore New Zealand and Australia – had declared war. On the ship home, the players collectively decided to volunteer for military service. Three of them were killed, including Downing at Gallipoli, Bobby Black at the Somme and Jim McNeece in hospital at Rouen of wounds received at Messines.

Downing enlisted with the Fifth Reinforcements (Wellington Battalion) on 2 February 1915. While doing basic training, he also played two games of rugby for the Trentham Military Forces Team, against Wellington on 1 May and Auckland on 5 June. In the first of these, Downing was reckoned to be the standout forward of the Trentham team, and "played splendidly".

On 13 June, he departed bound for Suez in Egypt, arriving 24 July. His unit took part, beginning on 6 August, in the Battle of Chunuk Bair, in support of the landing at Suvla Bay, which was intended to break the deadlock in the Gallipoli Campaign. The initial assault was successful and early on the morning of 8 August, Downing was with A Company occupying the Turkish trench on the crest of Chunuk Bair. The Turks counter-attacked at dawn, forcing back the British battalions and the Wellingtons. The crest was lost and the battle continued for 12 hours on the seaward slopes. By nightfall, Downing, who had earlier distinguished himself in a bayonet charge, was killed, reportedly "blown to pieces". Downing was the first of 13 All Blacks killed in the war, just a day before Henry Dewar, the second All Black to fall, was killed in action with the Wellington Mounted Rifles at Anzac Cove.

Sergeant Doolan Downing is commemorated on panel 17 of the New Zealand Memorial to the Missing on Chunuk Bair, along with his commanding officer, Lieutenant Colonel William George Malone, who died aged 56, and more than 300 other men of his battalion.
