= Richard Travis =

New Zealand recipient of the Victoria Cross (1884–1918)

Richard Charles Travis VC DCM MM
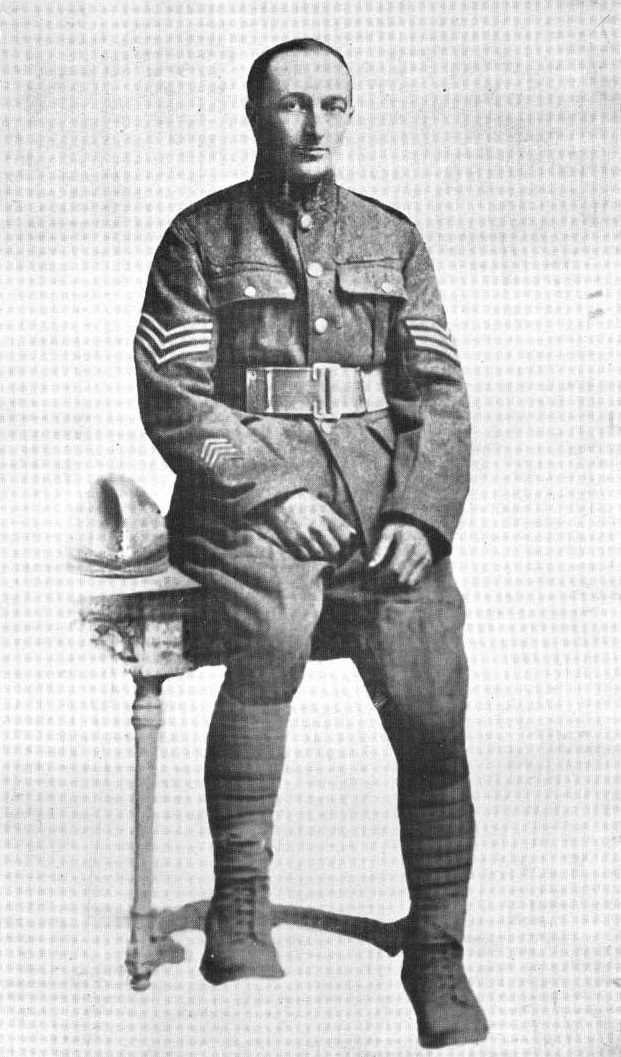
- Travis c. 1917 or 1918
- Born: 6 April 1884; Ōpōtiki, New Zealand
- Died: 25 July 1918 (aged 34); Rossignol Wood, France
- Burial place: Couin, France
- Military career
- Allegiance: New Zealand
- Branch: New Zealand Military Forces
- Service years: 1914–1918
- Rank: Sergeant
- Units: 2nd Battalion, Otago Infantry Regiment
- Conflicts: First World War; Gallipoli campaign; Landing at Anzac Cove; Western Front; Battle of the Somme; Hundred Days Offensive †
- Awards: Victoria Cross; Distinguished Conduct Medal; Military Medal; Mentioned in Despatches (2); Croix de guerre (Belgium)

Richard Charles Travis, VC, DCM, MM (born Dickson Cornelius Savage; 6 April 1884 – 25 July 1918) was a New Zealand soldier who fought during the First World War and was posthumously decorated with the Victoria Cross (VC), the highest award for gallantry in the face of the enemy that can be awarded to Commonwealth forces.

Born in Ōpōtiki, Travis worked as a farm hand and horse breaker and, as a young man, led a transient existence after leaving home at the age of 21. He volunteered for the New Zealand Expeditionary Force following the outbreak of the First World War and served briefly at Gallipoli. He was later sent to France where he fought in the trenches along the Western Front, earning a reputation as scout and sniper and receiving awards for his gallantry. On 24 July 1918, he carried out a reconnaissance into "no man's land" prior to an attack by his battalion, destroying a wire obstacle that may have slowed progress for the advancing troops. During the attack itself, he made a solo foray to deal with two weapons pits that were delaying the advance. He was killed by shellfire the next day but his exploits of 24 July led to him being awarded the VC posthumously.

== Early life ==
Dickson Cornelius Savage, as he was called originally, was born in April 1884. His father, James Savage, a former member of the New Zealand Armed Constabulary, had migrated to New Zealand from Ireland and farmed a block of land at Otara, a short distance from Ōpōtiki. His mother, Frances Theresa (née O'Keefe), had originally come from Sydney, Australia. The oldest boy out of seven children, Dickson Savage attended schools at Ōpōtiki but only completed the first four years of his education before his family took him out of school to work on the farm. He acquired various farming skills, but showed a particular talent for horse breaking, for which he earned a degree of local fame.

The impetuous Savage left home at age 21, after an argument with his father, and moved to Gisborne. He continued to work as a farmhand and further enhanced his reputation for horse breaking. Amid claims of impropriety with a local woman he moved on and, seeking a clean break, he changed his name to Richard Charles Travis. In 1910, he settled in Winton where he found work as a farmhand for Tom Murray, a local farmer, at his property around Ryal Bush. Sometime later he and Murray's daughter, Lettie, became engaged although the pair were not married before the war in Europe separated them.

== First World War ==
Less than a month after the outbreak of the First World War, Richard Travis sought to join the 7th (Southland) Mounted Rifles, a squadron of the Otago Mounted Rifles Regiment. Giving his occupation as "horsebreaker", he enlisted in Invercargill. His stature of 5 feet 6 inches (1.68 m) and weight 133 pounds (60 kg), with "a fresh complexion, blue eyes and fair hair", belied his military potential. He was attested on 20 August 1914 and after a short period of basic training Travis departed New Zealand along with the first contingent—known as the "Main Body"—of the New Zealand Expeditionary Force (NZEF) bound for Egypt.

=== Gallipoli ===
Upon arrival in the Middle East in December 1914, the New Zealanders undertook further training at camps in Egypt, before taking part in the landing at Anzac Cove as part of the Gallipoli campaign on 25 April 1915. The Otago Mounted Rifles Regiment (including Travis' Southland Squadron) did not take part in the initial landing; instead they were sent as dismounted reinforcements the following month. Travis, who was part of the transport section and had responsibility for breaking in new horses, was not scheduled to proceed with the rest of the Southland Mounted Rifles Squadron. Instead he was to remain with the horses in Egypt. Nevertheless, exhibiting the same disregard for discipline that had gotten him in trouble earlier in his life, he stowed away upon the squadron's transport and joined them on the Gallipoli Peninsula.

Travis' unauthorised presence was soon discovered and disciplinary proceedings followed: he was returned to Egypt and received 14 days' confinement. Nevertheless, in October he was later able join up with the Southland Squadron as it rested on Lemnos after the Battle of Sari Bair before returning to Gallipoli to take part in the final month of the campaign before the Allied forces were evacuated in December 1915. While at Anzac Cove he established a reputation as a fine soldier who possessed the ability to move through "no man's land" unscathed.

=== Western Front ===
Following their evacuation from Gallipoli, the New Zealanders returned to Egypt while the War Office considered their future deployment. After sustaining a knee injury while breaking in a horse, in March 1916, Travis was transferred to the infantry and was posted to the 8th (Southland) Company of the 2nd Battalion, Otago Infantry Regiment, New Zealand Division. When the division transferred to the European theatre, he sailed with it to France, arriving there in April, to serve in the trenches along the Western Front. After the 2nd Battalion entered the line near Armentières, Travis began conducting scouting missions at night into "no man's land" to gather intelligence on German positions and help in mapping the front. By the end of July 1916, he had been twice commended in brigade orders for his work in carrying out night patrols and recovering wounded soldiers. He had also been wounded, which saw him spend most of August in hospital receiving treatment.

In September 1916 he singlehandedly dealt with two German snipers that were firing upon a work party during the fighting on the Somme. He later received the Distinguished Conduct Medal (DCM), the British Empire's second highest gallantry award, for this action, the published citation for his award, which appeared in The London Gazette in November 1916, reading as follows:

For conspicuous gallantry in action. He went out by himself and accounted for several enemy snipers who were firing at a working party. He has on many previous occasions done very fine work.

After this the 2nd Battalion moved to Flanders to hold the line during winter. Throughout the remainder of 1916 he progressed through the ranks, soon reaching the rank of sergeant, whereupon he was given responsibility for a sniper and reconnaissance section consisting of hand picked men, tasked with conducting reconnaissance of German lines and capturing prisoners to gain intelligence. His section quickly grew a reputation for being able to provide important intelligence on the strength and positions of the enemy. As a leader he was said to have a casual approach towards things such as dress and military protocol, however, he was resourceful, had a well-developed understanding of enemy courses of action and had a penchant for detailed planning.

In early December 1917 Travis was sent to England; this was intended to be for a period of three months but Travis agitated for an earlier return and rejoined his battalion, serving on the front lines near Polygon Wood in Flanders, in mid January 1918. Soon afterwards, Travis was awarded the Croix de Guerre from the Belgian government. During the German spring offensive of April 1918, Travis was wounded which required hospitalisation for over two weeks. At the end of the following month, he was awarded the Military Medal (MM) "for acts of gallantry in the field".

In July 1918, as part of the operations undertaken prior to the Allied Hundred Days Offensive, planned for August, the 2nd Battalion, Otago Infantry Regiment, was committed to operations around Rossignol Wood, to the north of Hébuterne, where a salient had developed in the German lines. Following the initial attacks, the Germans withdrew from their positions and Travis, with the reconnaissance section, set out to discover their new location. On 24 July the battalion was scheduled to launch its attack. Prior to stepping off, Travis crossed "no man's land" in daylight and destroyed a wire obstacle that threatened to block the path of the battalion's advance. Later, after the attack had been checked by heavy fire from a number of machine gun positions, seeing the danger, Travis approached two weapons pits alone and killed their occupants.

He was killed the following day in a German artillery barrage while accompanying an officer on an inspection of the battalion's positions. Well known among the New Zealand Division for his exploits, his death affected its morale. On 26 July 1918, he was interred in a grave near the small village of Couin, which is now the site of the Couin New British Cemetery. For his deeds on 24 July he was posthumously awarded the Victoria Cross (VC) in September 1918. The VC, instituted in 1856, was the highest award for valour that could be bestowed on a serviceman of the British Empire. The citation for his VC read:

For most conspicuous bravery and devotion to duty. During 'surprise' operations it was necessary to destroy an impassable wire block. Serjt. Travis, regardless of personal danger, volunteered for this duty. Before zero hour, in broad daylight and in close proximity to enemy posts he crawled out and successfully destroyed the block with bombs, thus enabling the attacking parties to pass through. A few minutes later a bombing party on the right of the attack was held up by two enemy machine guns, and the success of the whole operation was in danger. Perceiving this Serjt. Travis with great gallantry and utter disregard of danger, rushed the position, killed the crews and captured the guns. An enemy officer and three men immediately rushed at him from a bend in the trench and attempted to retake the guns. These four he killed single handed, thus allowing the bombing party on which much depended to advance. The success of the operation was almost entirely due to the heroic work of this gallant N.C.O. and the vigour with which he made and used opportunities for inflicting casualties on the enemy. He was killed 24 hours later when, in a most intense bombardment prior to an enemy counter-attack, he was going from post to post encouraging the men.

— The London Gazette, No. 30922, 24 September 1918.

His reputation on the Western Front was such that the Commonwealth War Graves Commission recorded he was nicknamed the "Prince of Scouts" and "King of No Man's Land".

== The medal ==
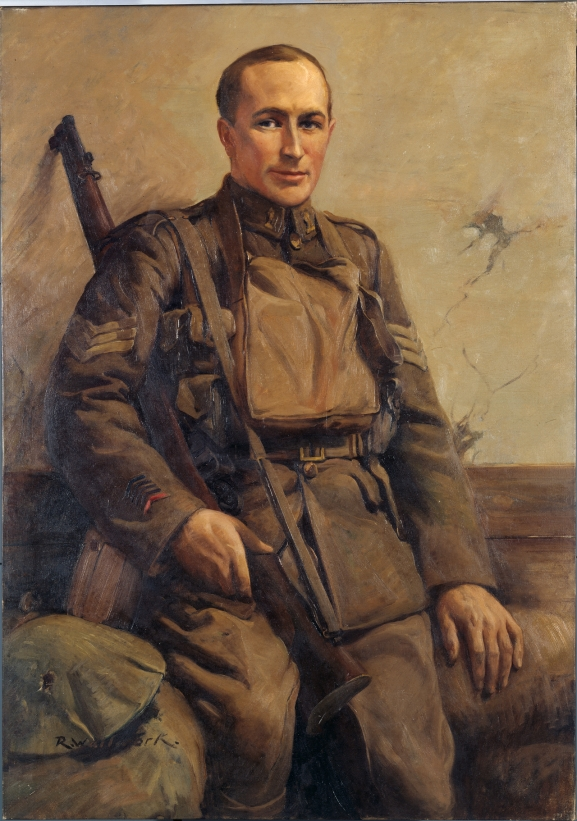
A posthumous portrait of Travis, painted by Richard Wallwork in 1920

Although Lettie Murray was named as the beneficiary of Travis' will, executed in May 1918, the ownership of Travis' medals was disputed after the war due to the estrangement from his family. Eventually it was settled that the majority of his possessions, including his medals, belonged to Lettie. A close friend of Travis ensured that some personal effects went to the family. Travis' medals which, in addition to the VC, DCM, MM and Croix de Guerre, included the 1914–15 Star, British War Medal and the Victory Medal, were loaned to the Returned Services Association in Rotorua for a display in 1965 for the 50th anniversary of the Gallipoli campaign. Lettie donated the medals to the Southland Museum, in Invercargill, in 1974 after her death. The medals were placed on public display from 25 April 2006 to 2 July 2006.

== Legacy ==
Travis is remembered by a memorial at Ryal Bush, where he was living at the time of his enlistment in the NZEF, and by a plaque in Queen's Gardens in Dunedin. His service is also commemorated by the annual Dick Travis VC Memorial Shoot at the Karori Rifle Club, in Wellington. He was also the subject of a painting by Richard Wallwork. Additionally, Travis Barracks at Linton Military Camp and Travis Street in Napier are named after him, and in 2011, New Zealand Post issued a 60 cent stamp featuring Travis.
