= Couin New British Cemetery =

WWI CWGC cemetery in Pas-de-Calais, France

- Commonwealth War Graves Commission (CWGC)
- Used for those deceased 1917–1918
- Established: 1917
- Location: 50.13953°N 2.53325°E near Doullens, France
- Designed by: Sir Reginald Blomfield
- Total burials: 363

Burials by nation
- Allied Powers: United Kingdom: 345; New Zealand: 14; Canada: 2; Germany: 2

Burials by war
- * First World War: 362

Couin New British Cemetery is a Commonwealth War Graves Commission (CWGC) burial ground for military personnel who died on the Western Front during the First World War. It is located in the Pas de Calais region of France. Established in 1917, it was designed by Sir Reginald Blomfield and is administered by the Commonwealth War Graves Commission. There are 363 soldiers of the First World War interred in the cemetery, including two from Germany.

== History ==
Couin is a village to the east of Doullens, in the Pas de Calais region of France. A chateau in the village was used as a headquarters for British forces in the area from 1915 to 1918 and a cemetery, the Couin British Cemetery, was established in May 1916 by the field ambulance of the 48th Division. The Couin New British Cemetery was started in January 1917 when the original cemetery reached capacity. It was used by field ambulances from then, although not continuously, until the end of the war.

== Cemetery ==
Designed by the English architect Sir Reginald Blomfield and administered by the Commonwealth War Graves Commission, the Couin New British Cemetery is located on the D2, a road running between Couin, to the southwest, and Souastre, to the northwest. The main entrance is along the southeast wall of the cemetery and a Cross of Sacrifice is located in the east corner. Across the road to the south is Couin British Cemetery.

The cemetery contains the remains of 363 military personnel, all from the First World War. The majority of the interments are British, with 14 New Zealanders, two Canadians and two Germans also buried there. A notable burial in the cemetery is Sergeant Richard Travis, a Victoria Cross recipient of the New Zealand Expeditionary Force who was killed in action on 25 July 1918.
