= Henry Dewar =

Henry Dewar may refer to:

- Henry Dewar (physician) (1771–1823), Scottish minister, physician and writer
- Henry Dewar, 3rd Baron Forteviot (1906–1993), Scottish businessman
- Henry Dewar (rugby union) (1883–1915), New Zealand rugby union forward
