= Richard Travis (disambiguation) =

Richard Travis was a New Zealand recipient of Victoria Cross

Richard Travis may also refer to:

- Richard Travis (actor) (1913–1989), American film and TV performer
- Richard Clay Travis (born 1979), American sports journalist on radio and TV
