= Richard Wallwork =

British born New Zealand artist, printmaker and teacher (1882-1955)

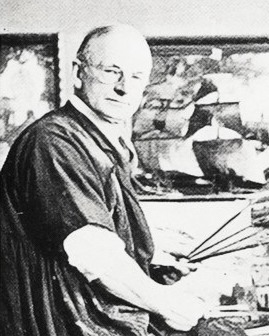
- Wallwork in 1934
- Born: 2 January 1882; Stretford, England
- Died: 14 April 1955 (aged 73); Christchurch, New Zealand
- Education: Manchester School of Art; Royal College of Art
- Known for: War art Painting
- Spouse: Elizabeth Wallwork

Richard Wallwork (2 January 1882 – 14 April 1955) was a New Zealand artist. Born in England, he studied at the Manchester School of Art and then Royal College of Art. He taught at Liverpool City School of Art and in 1910 was recruited to teach at the Canterbury College School of Art in Christchurch in New Zealand. He moved there with his wife Elizabeth Wallwork and established a reputation as a respected teacher and eventually rose to become director of the college. He had a prodigious output of landscapes of Canterbury and historical works of classic and Maori legends as well as taking commissions for portraits. He died in Christchurch at the age of 73.

== Early life ==
Richard Wallwork was born on 2 January 1882 at Stretford in Lancashire into a large family. His father, also named Richard Wallwork, was married to Mary née Smith and worked in leather goods. Stretford was an industrial area on the outskirts of Manchester with little in the way of luxuries. The Wallwork family were cautious with their finances, even more so when Wallwork's father died in 1897. His mother had to take up sewing for income while Wallwork himself was working as well for the benefit of the family.

In 1899, he enrolled for evening classes at Manchester's Municipal School of Art where he would study art until 1906. This include periods travelling in Belgium and France on a scholarship. He was an excellent student, earning first class honours in a number of subjects and several cash awards and scholarships. He then attended the Royal College of Art on a scholarship and became a valued student teacher working with Gerald Moira. He took courses in mural and decorative painting, etching and engraving, art history, and architecture while at the college.

== Teaching ==
In late 1909 he was recruited to teach at the Liverpool City School of Art and commenced work there early the following year, teaching drawing and painting. On 16 July 1910, he married Elizabeth (née Donaldson), a promising artist in her own right who had also attended the Municipal School of Art and then went on to the Slade School of Fine Art in London. Soon afterwards, Robert Herdman Smith, the head of the Canterbury College School of Art in Christchurch in New Zealand, made contact with a view to offering him a position as an instructor to replace Sydney Thompson. Herdman Smith was familiar with Wallwork's art, having the previous year purchased his mural of Robert the Bruce from the Royal College of Art, as well as his reputation as a good teacher. Wallwork accepted the role and the couple departed for New Zealand in December 1910.

== Life in New Zealand ==
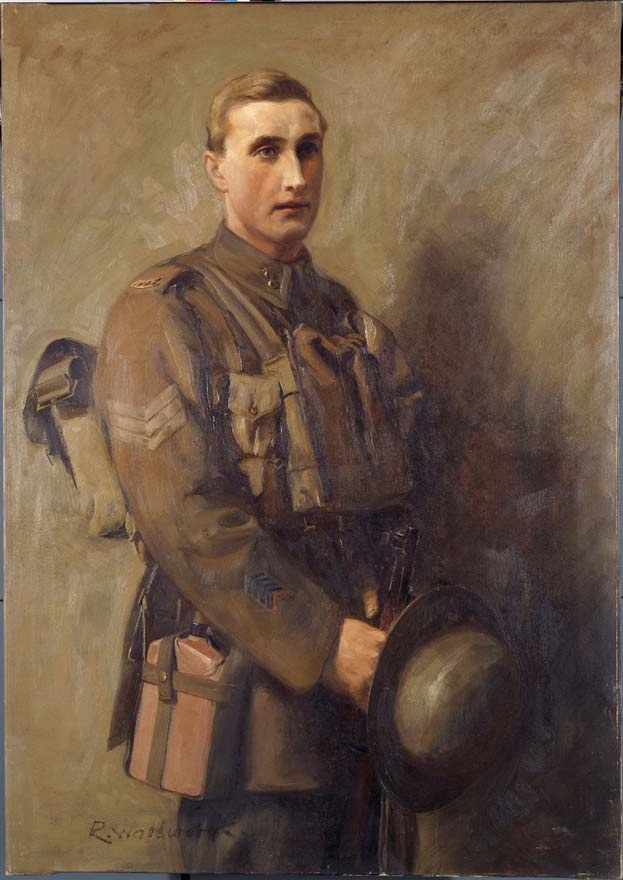
Wallwork's portrait of Victoria Cross recipient Samuel Forsyth, completed in 1920

They soon settled into life in Christchurch and started travelling around the country, painting as they went. His early output was poorly received but within a few years his work was beginning to become sought after. Both the Wallworks joined the Canterbury Society of Arts and Richard would be involved with the organisation for over 40 years, including a period as its president from 1927 to 1928. His output included Canterbury landscapes, depictions of scenes of classic and Maori legends, as well as portraits. After the First World War, he was commissioned to execute portraits of New Zealand Victoria Cross recipients Richard Travis and Samuel Forsyth. He had been exempted from service during the war because of medical reasons.

At the Canterbury College School of Art, Wallwork taught not just painting but also etching and established a reputation as a respected teacher. By 1920, he was head of the drawing and painting department but still had capacity to undertake commissioned work. In 1928 Wallwork was appointed as director of the School of Art following the retirement of his predecessor. Under his guidance the curriculum for a diploma in fine arts was developed and within a few years he was on the professional board. In 1932, when the Robert McDougall Art Gallery was established, he was on its advisory committee. He retired as director of the college at the end of 1945 but carried out teaching in a part-time role for a further three years.

Even into his seventies, he continued to exhibit his work, most often at the Canterbury Society of Arts and the New Zealand Academy of Fine Arts but also elsewhere. He died in Christchurch on 14 April 1955 at the age of 73, survived by Elizabeth and a daughter. Although his output declined in his final years as he became ill with lung cancer, his studio still contained several hundred paintings at the time of his death. His wife organised a posthumous exhibition of over 100 of his works the following year.
