= 12th (Otago) Mounted Rifles =

- Active: 1911 - 1921
- Country: New Zealand
- Allegiance: New Zealand Crown
- Branch: New Zealand Army
- Role: Mounted
- Size: Regiment
- Part of: New Zealand Mounted Rifles Brigade
- Engagements: World War I

The 12th (Otago) Mounted Rifles was formed 17 March 1911. During World War I they formed part of the Otago Mounted Rifles Regiment and saw service during the Battle of Gallipoli, afterwards they were withdrawn to Egypt and later were the only New Zealand Mounted troops to serve in France with the New Zealand Division.

== Great War Battles ==
- Battle of Gallipoli
- Battle of Flers - Courcelette. 15–22 Sep 1916.
- Battle of Morval. 25–28 Sep 1916.
- Battle of Le Transloy. 1–18 Oct 1916.
- Battle of Messines. 7–14 Jun 1917.
- Battle of Polygon Wood. 26 Sep – 3 Oct 1917.
- Battle of Broodseinde. 4 Oct 1917.
- Battle of Passchendaele. 12 Oct 1917.
- Battle of Arras. 28 Mar 1918.
- Battle of the Ancre. 5 Apr 1918.
- Battle of Albert. 21–23 Aug 1918.
- Second Battle of Bapaume. 31 Aug – 3 Sep 1918.
- Battle of Havrincourt. 12 Sep 1918.
- Battle of the Canal du Nord. 27 Sep – 1 Oct 1918.
- Battle of Cambrai. 8–9 Oct 1918.
- Pursuit to the Selle. 9–12 Oct 1918.
- Battle of the Selle. 17–25 Oct 1918.
- Battle of the Sambre. 4 Nov 1918, including the Capture of Le Quesnoy.

== Between the wars ==
They amalgamated with the 5th Mounted Rifles (Otago Hussars) and the 7th (Southland) Mounted Rifles to become the 5th New Zealand Mounted Rifles in 1921.
