= Elizabeth Wallwork =

New Zealand artist

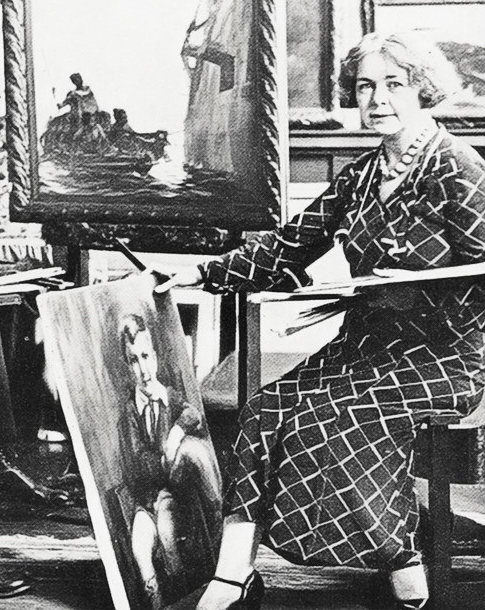
- Wallwork in 1934
- Born: Elizabeth Donaldson; 20 July 1883; Broughton, England
- Died: 4 June 1969 (aged 85); Christchurch, New Zealand
- Education: Manchester School of Art, Slade School of Fine Art
- Known for: Painting
- Spouse: Richard Wallwork

Elizabeth Wallwork (née Donaldson; 20 July 1883 – 4 June 1969) was a New Zealand artist.

== Early life ==
Born Elizabeth Donaldson on 20 July 1883, in Broughton, England, she was the sixth of nine children of Elizabeth Ann Hibbert and John Donaldson.

In 1911 she moved to New Zealand with her husband, fellow artist, Richard Wallwork, after he was offered position of life master at the Canterbury College School of Art, Christchurch.

== Education ==
Wallwork studied at Manchester School of Art (previously Municipal School of Art) and at the Slade School of Fine Art in London, receiving two first-class certificates in drawing and in painting in 1907–1908. She was awarded the Lady Whitworth Scholarship.

== Career ==
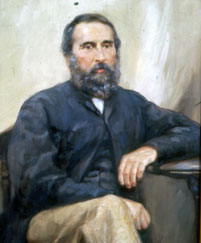
Portrait by Wallwork of Henry John Tancred, Chancellor of Canterbury College (University of Canterbury) 1871-1885

Wallwork was known as one of the foremost exponents of pastel portraiture in New Zealand. She also painted in oil and exhibited landscapes.

While in England Wallwork exhibited with Manchester and Liverpool Art Galleries, and the Salon in Paris. In New Zealand she exhibited with several art societies including:

- Auckland Society of Arts
- Canterbury Society of Arts
- New Zealand Academy of Fine Arts
- Otago Art Society

Her work was included in the:

- British Empire Exhibition, London, 1924
- New Zealand and South Seas Exhibition, Dunedin, 1925–1926
- New Zealand Centennial Exhibition of 1940

Work by Wallwork can be found in the collections of the Museum of New Zealand Te Papa Tongarewa and Christchurch Art Gallery Te Puna o Waiwhetu.
