= 5th Mounted Rifles (Otago Hussars) =

- Active: 1911–1921
- Country: New Zealand
- Allegiance: New Zealand Crown
- Branch: New Zealand Army
- Role: Mounted
- Size: Regiment
- Part of: New Zealand Mounted Rifles Brigade
- Engagements: World War I

The 5th Mounted Rifles (Otago Hussars) was formed on 17 March 1911. It formed part of the Otago Mounted Rifles Regiment so they saw service during the Battle of Gallipoli, Egypt. They later served in France with the New Zealand Division and were the only New Zealand Mounted troops to serve in France.

== Great War battles ==
- Battle of Gallipoli
- Battle of Flers - Courcelette (15–22 September 1916)
- Battle of Morval (25–28 September 1916)
- Battle of Le Transloy (1–18 October 1916)
- Battle of Messines (7–14 June 1917)
- Battle of Polygon Wood (26 September – 3 October 1917)
- Battle of Broodseinde (4 October 1917)
- Battle of Passchendaele (12 October 1917)
- Battle of Arras (28 March 1918)
- Battle of the Ancre (5 April 1918)
- Battle of Albert (21–23 August 1918)
- Second Battle of Bapaume (31 August – 3 September 1918)
- Battle of Havrincourt (12 September 1918)
- Battle of the Canal du Nord (27 September – 1 October 1918)
- Battle of Cambrai (8–9 October 1918)
- Pursuit to the Selle (9–12 October 1918)
- Battle of the Selle (17–25 October 1918)
- Battle of the Sambre (4 November 1918)

== Between the wars ==
The unit amalgamated with 7th (Southland) Mounted Rifles and the 12th (Otago) Mounted Rifles to become the 5th New Zealand Mounted Rifles. They were redesignated the 5th New Zealand Mounted Rifles (Otago Hussars) on 4 August 1923 and in 1927 they became the Otago Mounted Rifles. 29 March 1944 saw them absorbed into the 3rd Armoured Regiment.
