= The Farm Commonwealth War Graves Commission Cemetery =

WWI CWGC cemetery in Gallipoli, Turkey

Coordinates: 40°15′15″N 26°18′17″E

The Farm
- Commonwealth War Graves Commission
- Used for those deceased April–December 1915
- Established: 1919
- Location: near Gallipoli, Turkey
- Total burials: 652
- Unknowns: 645

Burials by nation
- Allied Powers: British: 17; Australian: 1

Burials by war
- World War I: 652

The Farm Cemetery is a Commonwealth War Graves Commission cemetery on the Gallipoli Peninsula in Turkey. It contains the remains of some of the soldiers killed during World War I in the Battles at Gallipoli.

The Turks referred to a small stone shepherd's hut on the western slopes of the Chunuk Bair ridge as Aghyl (sheepfold), whilst the Allied troops called it The Farm. The position was captured by Allied troops on 6 August 1915 at the start of the Battle of Chunuk Bair but lost on 10 August in the overwhelming Turkish counter-attack which pushed the Allies back off the ridge, bringing the battle to a close.

The cemetery was constructed after the Armistice from remains recovered in the surrounding area. Special memorials commemorate seven soldiers believed to be among its 645 unidentified burials.
