= Messines Ridge British Cemetery =

WWI CWGC cemetery in Belgium

- Commonwealth War Graves Commission
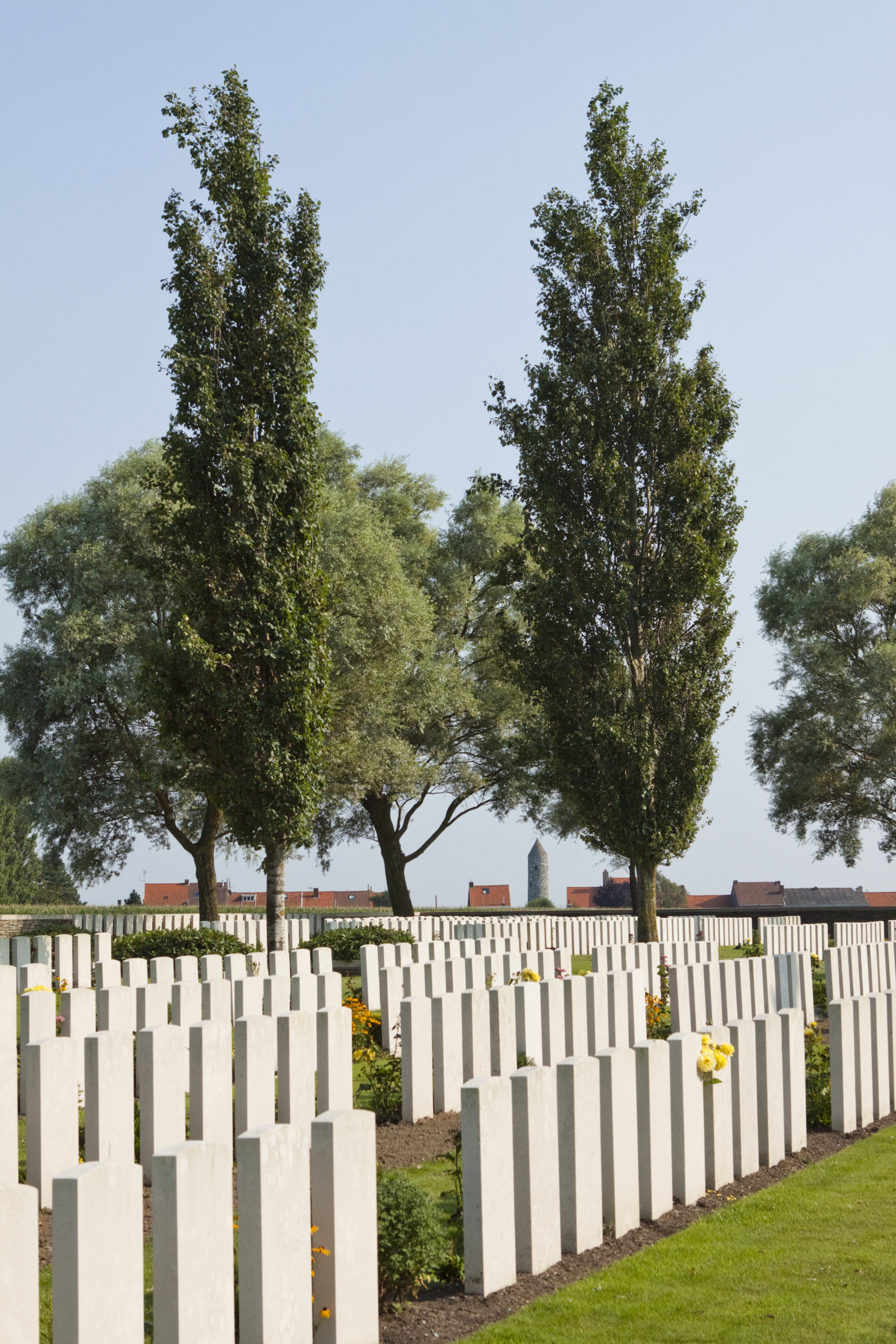
- Used for those deceased 1914–1918
- Established: Postwar
- Location: 50°45′54″N 02°53′27″E near Mesen, West Flanders, Belgium
- Designed by: Charles Holden
- Total burials: 1,493
- Unknowns: 954

Burials by nation
- Allied Powers: United Kingdom: 986; Australia: 332; New Zealand: 115; South Africa: 56; Canada: 1; Known unto God: 1; Unknown 954

Burials by war
- First World War: 1,493

Messines Ridge British Cemetery is a Commonwealth War Graves Commission (CWGC) burial ground for the dead of the First World War located in the Ypres Salient in Belgium on the Western Front.

== History ==
The town of Messines (now Mesen) was the site of several battles during the First World War, beginning with its capture by German forces in late October and early November in 1914.Later in the war, it formed the southern corner of the Ypres Salient and in June 1917, the New Zealand Division drove the Germans out in the Battle of Messines, taking 3,700 casualties in the process. In March 1918, it was lost to the Germans in the Spring Offensive and returned to Allied control again in September 1918, when it was seized during the Hundred Days Offensive.

== Foundation ==
Messines Ridge British Cemetery was established after the First World War for the remains of soldiers collected from several smaller cemeteries in the area. These included the Bell Farm Cemetery, Blauwepoortebeek Cemetery, Bousbecques East German Cemetery, Bristol Castle Military Cemetery, Lumm Farm Cemetery, Middle Farm Cemetery, Onraet Farm Cemetery, Queensland Cemetery and the River Douve Cemetery. Most of these cemeteries held men that were killed in the period from June to December 1917. One, the Bousbecques East German Cemetery, held four British soldiers that had died in November 1914 while the Bristol Castle Military Cemetery dated from September–October 1918.

== Cemetery ==
The cemetery, designed by the English architect Charles Holden and located on the Mesen-Wulvergem Road, to the west of Mesen, holds the remains of 1,493 Allied soldiers, over half of whom are unknown. It was established on land that formerly belonged to the 'Institution Royale'.

Within the cemetery are special memorials to several soldiers who are believed to be among the unknown remains buried at the cemetery; four British, ten Australian, thirteen New Zealanders and one South African. In addition, there are special memorials to thirteen British soldiers buried in other cemeteries in the area during the war but whose graves were destroyed by artillery fire. In total, 1,534 soldiers are buried or remembered at the cemetery.

Bodies continue to be occasionally discovered in the area and are often interred at the cemetery; one was found while digging a pipeline and was formally interred on 25 February 2013. Although the identity of the soldier was not known, he was believed to be a New Zealander, as badges and paraphernalia from the New Zealand Rifle Brigade was found with his remains. This followed another interment of an unknown New Zealander the previous year.

=== Messines Ridge (New Zealand) Memorial ===
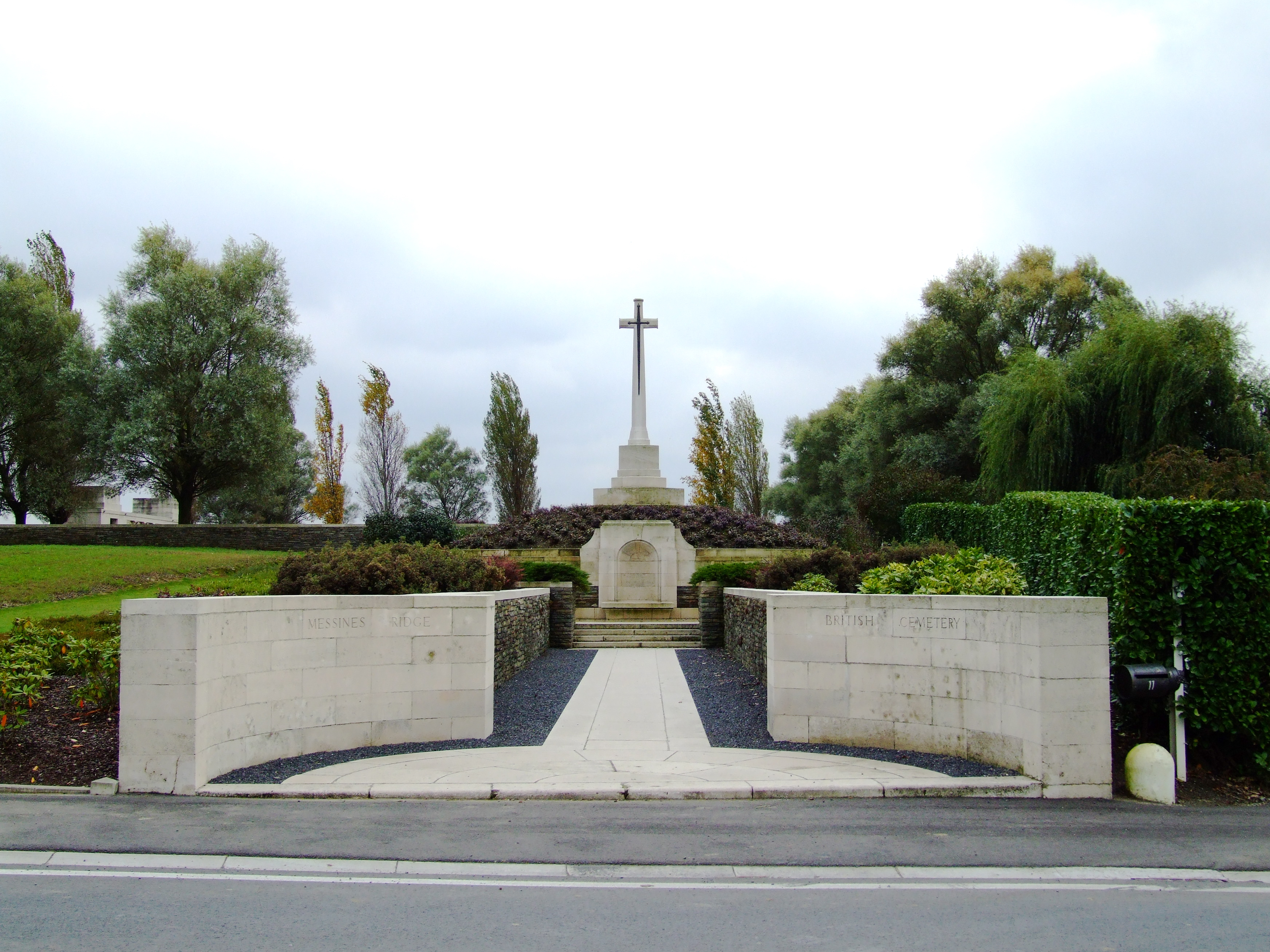
The entrance to the New Zealand Memorial to the Missing

The cemetery also includes the New Zealand Memorial to the Missing, also designed by Holden, in memory of 840 soldiers of the New Zealand Expeditionary Force killed in the area and who have no known grave. The memorial, at the entrance to the cemetery, takes the form of a Cross of Sacrifice on a circular base about which are provided panels with the names of the missing, including that of the All Black George Sellars, killed during the Battle of Messines.
