= Arthur Bauchop =

New Zealand military officer

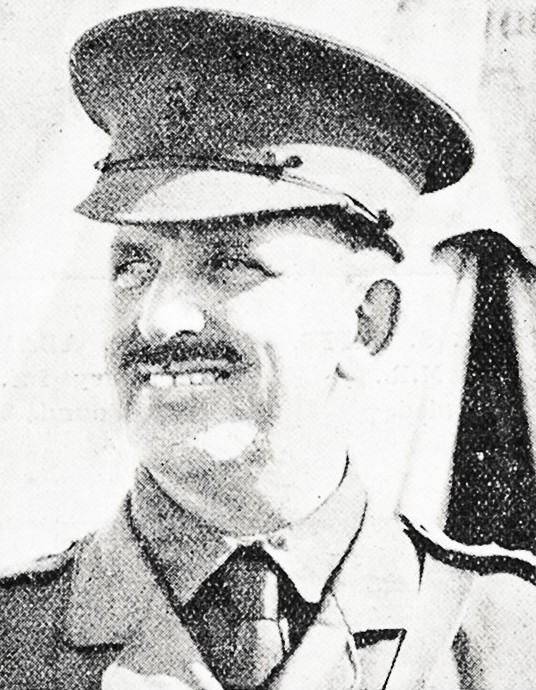
- Born: 1 February 1871; Port Chalmers, New Zealand
- Died: 10 August 1915 (aged 44) (DOW); Gallipoli, Ottoman Turkey
- Military career
- Allegiance: New Zealand
- Branch: New Zealand Military Forces
- Rank: Lieutenant Colonel
- Commands: Otago Mounted Rifles
- Conflicts: Second Boer War; First World War; Gallipoli campaign; Battle of Chunuk Bair (DOW)
- Awards: Companion of the Order of St Michael and St George; Mentioned in Despatches (3)

Arthur Bauchop, CMG (1 February 1871 – 10 August 1915) was an officer in the New Zealand Military Forces who served in the Second Boer War and the First World War. He commanded the Otago Mounted Rifles during the Gallipoli campaign, and died of wounds received during the Battle of Chunuk Bair.

== Early life ==
Born on 27 February 1870 in Port Chalmers, near Dunedin in New Zealand, Arthur Bauchop was the son of Robert Bauchop, a sawmiller, and his wife Maria. He was schooled locally, at Port Chalmers District High School, and then went onto Otago Boys' High School. He was athletically inclined, participating in long-distance running and playing rugby union. He served in the militia, as a member of the Port Chalmers Naval Artillery and in 1898 enlisted in the Garrison Artillery.

== South Africa ==
The Second Boer War arose from tensions between the Boer South African Republic and the British authorities in the Transvaal of South Africa over control of the region. In September 1899, just prior to the commencement of hostilities, New Zealand's Parliament offered the British Government a mounted rifles contingent from the New Zealand Military Forces for service in South Africa, which was accepted. Three contingents had been dispatched to South Africa by the end of the year.

Bauchop volunteered to join the Fourth Contingent raised for service in the war. Made a lieutenant, he and the rest of the contingent, nicknamed the "Rough Riders", left New Zealand in March 1900 and landed in Portuguese East Africa the following month. The contingent were deployed as part of the Rhodesian Field Force around Mafeking. Aside from a brief action at Ottoshoop in August, the Rough Riders spent the majority of their war service in the Transvaal, carrying out reconnaissance patrols and pursuing Boer commandos. As part of the effort to deprive the Boers of resources, they also helped to destroy crops and round up civilians and cattle, during which they occasionally skirmished with armed commandos. Bauchop was twice mentioned in despatches during this time.

In June 1901 the "Rough Riders" returned to New Zealand but Bauchop stayed in South Africa to serve with the Seventh Contingent, which had just arrived in the country. By the end of the war in South Africa, he had attained the rank of major and in recognition of his services was made a Companion of the Order of St Michael and St George.

After his return from South Africa, Bauchop sought a career as a professional soldier and was duly appointed to the New Zealand Permanent Militia. He commanded the Canterbury Military District from 1904 to 1906, during which time he was promoted to lieutenant colonel. He then commanded the Wellington Military District from 1906 to 1910. When the New Zealand Staff Corps was formed in 1911, he was transferred to that formation. The following year, he attended the Staff College at Camberley in England but scored poorly on tests and was returned to New Zealand. He was appointed commander of the Otago Military District in July 1912.

== First World War ==
On the outbreak of the First World War, Bauchop was seconded to the New Zealand Expeditionary Force (NZEF) and made commanding officer of the Otago Mounted Rifles (OMR). Bauchop was not happy with the posting; Major General Alexander Godley, the commander of the NZEF, had overlooked him for the more important position as commander of the Mounted Rifles Brigade. Godley considered that Bauchop's administrative skills were insufficient for the needs of a brigade command. The OMR was a separate regiment of mounted rifles that was to be under divisional control.

The main body of the NZEF departed New Zealand in mid-October 1914, destined for the Middle East. For the mounted units, much of the voyage was spent caring for their horses, of which there were over 3,800. Once they had arrived at Alexandria, in Egypt, in December 1914, the troops of the NZEF expected to continue onto Europe after a period of training. However, in early April 1915, military planners in London decided that the NZEF would be part of the Allied forces that would open up a new front in the Middle East, by landing on the Gallipoli Peninsula.

Although some of the OMR were originally attached to the forces allocated to the landing at Anzac Cove on 25 April, their orders were cancelled. It was not until May that the OMR were landed, sans horses, at Gallipoli. The regiment manned the line at No. 1 and 2 Outposts, replacing the Canterbury Mounted Rifles which was involved in an attack on the Turkish position at Rhododendron Ridge at the end of the month. He was wounded on 15 July but was quickly back in the frontlines.

In August, the OMR was involved in the Battle of Chunuk Bair during which it was tasked with attacking a spur between the hills of Aghyl Dere and Chailak Dere that led up to the prominent hill of Chunuk Bair. On the night of 6 August, Bauchop led a party up the slopes and secured the position. After ordering the establishment of a defensive line, he and his men fended off a number of counterattacks mounted by the Turkish forces. On daybreak he was shot by a sniper while he was shouting encouragement to his men. Mortally wounded, he was evacuated to the beaches and taken aboard a hospital ship. He died on 10 August 1915 and was buried at sea. General Ian Hamilton, on reporting Bauchop's death to the New Zealand government, noted that he and a battalion commander of the NZEF also killed at Chunuk Bair, were "first-class soldiers and real leaders in the field".

Bauchop was posthumously mentioned in despatches in November 1915. Having no known grave, he is remembered on the Lone Pine Memorial at the Lone Pine Cemetery in Gallipoli. He was survived by his wife and child. The elongate spur between Aghyl Dere and Chailak Dere where Bauchop received his fatal wounds was known to those serving at ANZAC Cove as Bauchop's Hill.
