= 7th (Southland) Mounted Rifles =

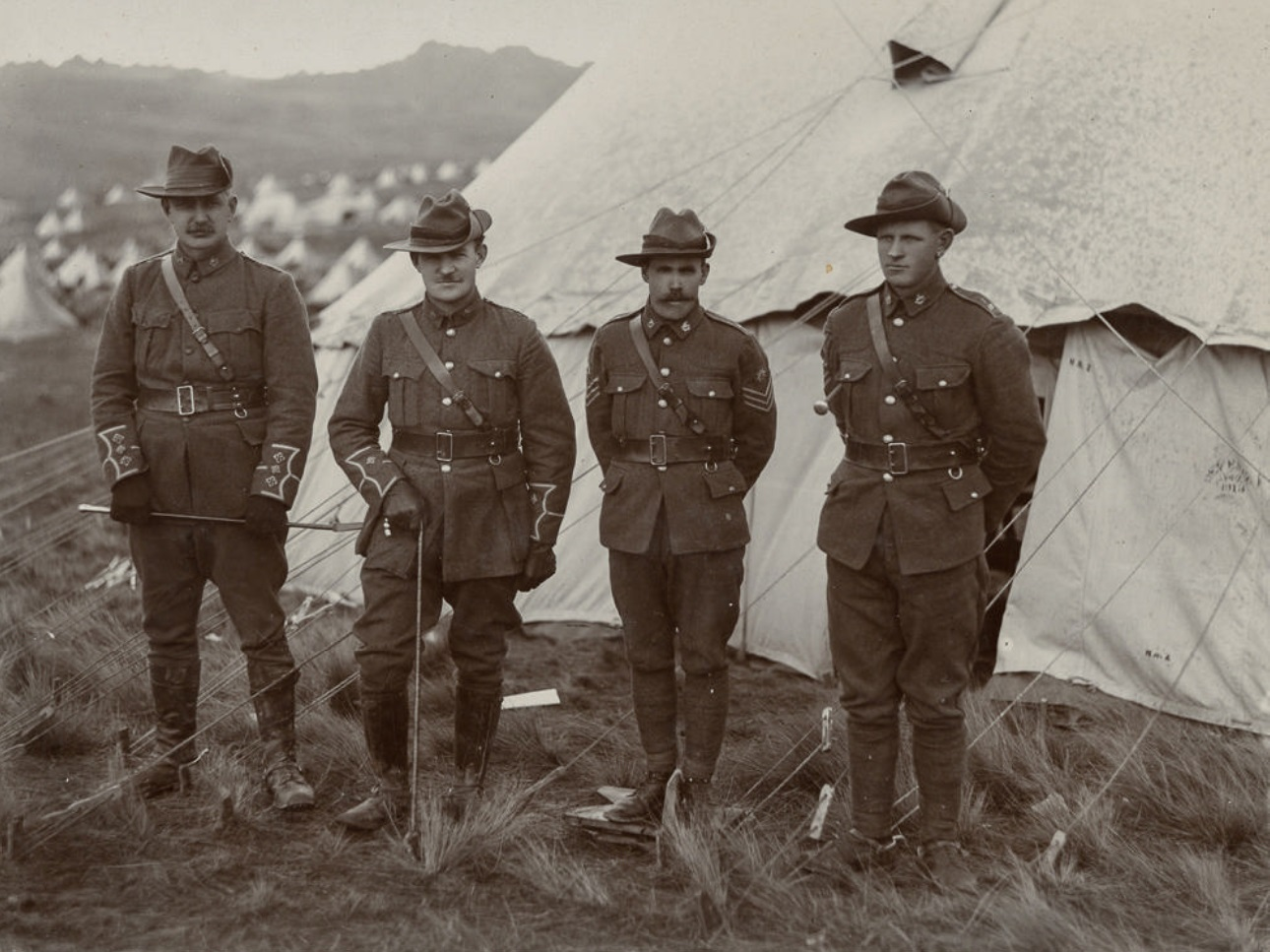
- Dr Joseph (Joey) Rodgers, Lieutenant Jack Munro, Sergeant-Major William (Bill) Leitch and Sergeant James Cushnie of the 7th (Southland) Mounted Rifles
- Active: 1911–1921
- Country: New Zealand
- Allegiance: New Zealand Crown
- Branch: New Zealand Army
- Role: Mounted
- Size: Regiment
- Part of: New Zealand Mounted Rifles Brigade
- Engagements: World War I: Battle of Gallipoli; Battle of Flers - Courcelette; Battle of Morval; Battle of Le Transloy; Battle of Messines (1917); Battle of Polygon Wood; Battle of Broodseinde; Battle of Passchendaele; Battle of Arras; Battle of the Ancre; Battle of Albert; Battle of Bapaume; Battle of Havrincourt; Battle of the Canal du Nord; Battle of Cambrai; Pursuit to the Selle; Battle of the Selle; Battle of the Sambre including the Capture of Le Quesnoy.

Commanders
- Honorary Colonel: Major General Sir Alexander Godley

The 7th (Southland) Mounted Rifles was raised on 17 March 1911. During World War I they formed part of the Otago Mounted Rifles Regiment and served in the Battle of Gallipoli and was then withdrawn to Egypt. They would later serve in France, with the New Zealand Division.

== Great War Battles ==
- Battle of Gallipoli
- Battle of Flers - Courcelette. 15 – 22 Sep 1916.
- Battle of Morval. 25 – 28 Sep 1916.
- Battle of Le Transloy. 1 – 18 Oct 1916.
- Battle of Messines. 7 – 14 Jun 1917.
- Battle of Polygon Wood. 26 Sep – 3 Oct 1917.
- Battle of Broodseinde. 4 Oct 1917.
- Battle of Passchendaele. 12 Oct 1917.
- Battle of Arras. 28 Mar 1918.
- Battle of the Ancre. 5 Apr 1918.
- Battle of Albert. 21 – 23 Aug 1918.
- Battle of Bapaume. 31 Aug – 3 Sep 1918.
- Battle of Havrincourt. 12 Sep 1918.
- Battle of the Canal du Nord. 27 Sep – 1 Oct 1918.
- Battle of Cambrai. 8 – 9 Oct 1918.
- Pursuit to the Selle. 9 – 12 Oct 1918.
- Battle of the Selle. 17 – 25 Oct 1918.
- Battle of the Sambre. 4 Nov 1918, including the Capture of Le Quesnoy.

Major General Sir Alexander Godley was appointed honorary colonel of the Regiment in 1914.

== Between the Wars ==
They amalgamated with the 5th Mounted Rifles (Otago Hussars) and the 12th (Otago) Mounted Rifles to become the 5th New Zealand Mounted Rifles in 1921.
