= Battle of Chunuk Bair =

1915 conflict in Gallipoliㅤ

Coordinates: 40°15′7.2″N 26°18′30.6″E

- Part of the Gallipoli campaign of World War I
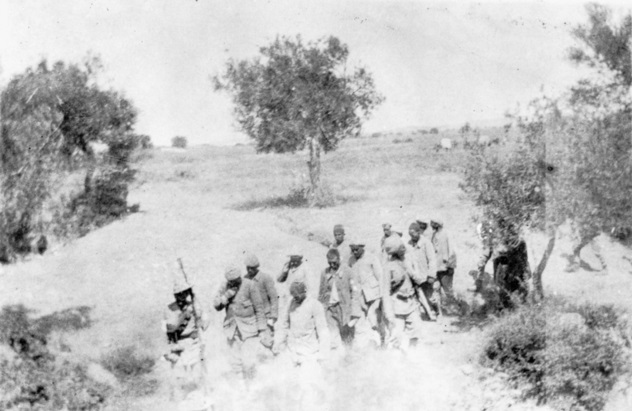
- Turkish POWs being escorted in Chunuk Bair
Date	7–19 August 1915
Location	Chunuk Bair, Gallipoli, Ottoman Empire
Result	Ottoman victory

Belligerents
Allied Powers : British Empire: Australia; New Zealand; United Kingdom	Ottoman Empire: (German Empire) Germany (military officers)

Commanders and leaders
(British Empire) Alexander Godley (Dominion of New Zealand) Lt. Colonel Malone †	(Ottoman Empire) Mustafa Kemal Pasha (WIA) (German Empire) Hans Kannengießer (WIA)

Strength
(Dominion of New Zealand) Wellington Battalion 15,000 men	(Ottoman Empire) 19th Division (Ottoman Empire) 9th Division (20,000–30,000 men)

Casualties and losses
12,000–13,000 casualties	9,200 casualties

The Battle of Chunuk Bair (Turkish: Conk Bayırı Muharebesi) was a World War I battle fought between the Ottoman defenders and troops of the British Empire over control of the peak in August 1915. The capture of Chunuk Bair, (Turkish: Çanak Bayır Basin Slope, now Conk Bayırı), the secondary peak of the Sari Bair range, was one of the two objectives of the Battle of Sari Bair.

British units that reached the summit of Chunuk Bair early on 8 August 1915 to engage the Turks were the Wellington Battalion of the New Zealand and Australian Division, 7th (Service) Battalion, Gloucestershire Regiment; and 8th (Service) Battalion, Welch Regiment, both of the 13th (Western) Division. The troops were reinforced in the afternoon by two squads of the Auckland Mounted Rifles Regiment, also part of the New Zealand and Australian Division. The first troops on the summit were severely depleted by Ottoman return fire and were relieved at 10:30 pm on 8 August by the Otago Battalion (NZ), and the Wellington Mounted Rifles Regiment, New Zealand and Australian Division. The New Zealand troops were relieved by 8:00 pm on 9 August by the 6th Battalion, South Lancashire Regiment, and 5th Battalion, Wiltshire Regiment, who were massacred and driven off the summit in the early morning of 10 August, by an Ottoman counter-attack led by Mustafa Kemal.

The British August Offensive at Anzac Cove and Suvla was an attempt to try to break the stalemate that the Gallipoli Campaign had become. The capture of Chunuk Bair was the only success for the Allies of the campaign but it was fleeting as the position proved untenable. The Ottomans recaptured the peak for good a few days later.

== Background ==
=== August offensive ===
The failure of the Allies to capture Krithia or make any progress on the Cape Helles front, led General Ian Hamilton, commander of the Mediterranean Expeditionary Force (MEF) to pursue a new plan to secure the Sari Bair Range and capture the high ground of Hill 971 and Chunuk Bair. Both sides had been reinforced, with Hamilton's original five divisions increased to 15 divisions and the six original Ottoman divisions having grown to a force of 16 divisions. The British planned to land two fresh infantry divisions from IX Corps (Lieutenant-General Frederick Stopford), at Suvla, 5 miles (8.0 km) north of Anzac, followed by an advance on Sari Bair from the north-west to Hill 971.

== Prelude ==
=== Anzac plan of attack ===
At Anzac an offensive would be made against the Sari Bair range by the New Zealand and Australian Division (Major-General Alexander Godley) on the northern flank advancing through rough and thinly defended terrain north of the Anzac perimeter. The division had been reinforced with most of the 13th (Western) Division (Lieutenant-General F. C. Shaw), the 29th Indian Infantry Brigade and the Indian Mountain Artillery Brigade, to about 20,000 front-line infantry. The attack would be conducted by a Right Assaulting Column up Rhododendron Spur to Chunuk Bair and the Left Assaulting Column would divide at Aghyl Dere and half would advance across Damakjelik Spur and Azma Dere to the Abdul Rahman Spur and then attack Hill 971, the other part of the force would move to the right up Damakjelik Spur to Hill Q. To prevent delays, a Right Covering Force was to take Destroyer Hill, Table top, Old No 3 Post and Bauchop's Hill and the Left Covering Force was to reach Walden Point, cross Aghyl Dere and take Damakjelik Bair.

After the covering forces had captured their objectives by 10:30 p.m. the attacking columns would advance at 10:30 p.m. to reach the ridge an hour before dawn. Once Hill Q and Hill 971 had been captured, the Left Assaulting Column was to dig in and the Right Assaulting Column would consolidate Chunuk Bair and capture Battleship Hill, assisted by dawn attacks on the Nek and Baby 700 from the Nek from Russell's Top, by dismounted Australian light horse from the 3rd Light Horse Brigade, in concert with an attack on the summit of Chunuk Bair by soldiers from the New Zealand Infantry Brigade (Colonel Francis Johnston), who would traverse Rhododendron Spur, the Apex and the Farm. Hill 971 would be attacked by Gurkhas of the 29th Indian Brigade and Australians of the 4th Infantry Brigade.

=== Ottoman defences ===
The Ottoman senior commanders did not expect an attack at Chunuk Bair as it felt that the rugged terrain was unsuitable for an attack. However, the commanding officer of the section, Mustafa Kemal, commander of the Ottoman 19th Division, anticipated an attack. He felt that the peak of Chunuk Bair was especially vulnerable. He was unable to convince his superiors to significantly strengthen the defences.

== Battle ==
=== Rhododendron Spur ===
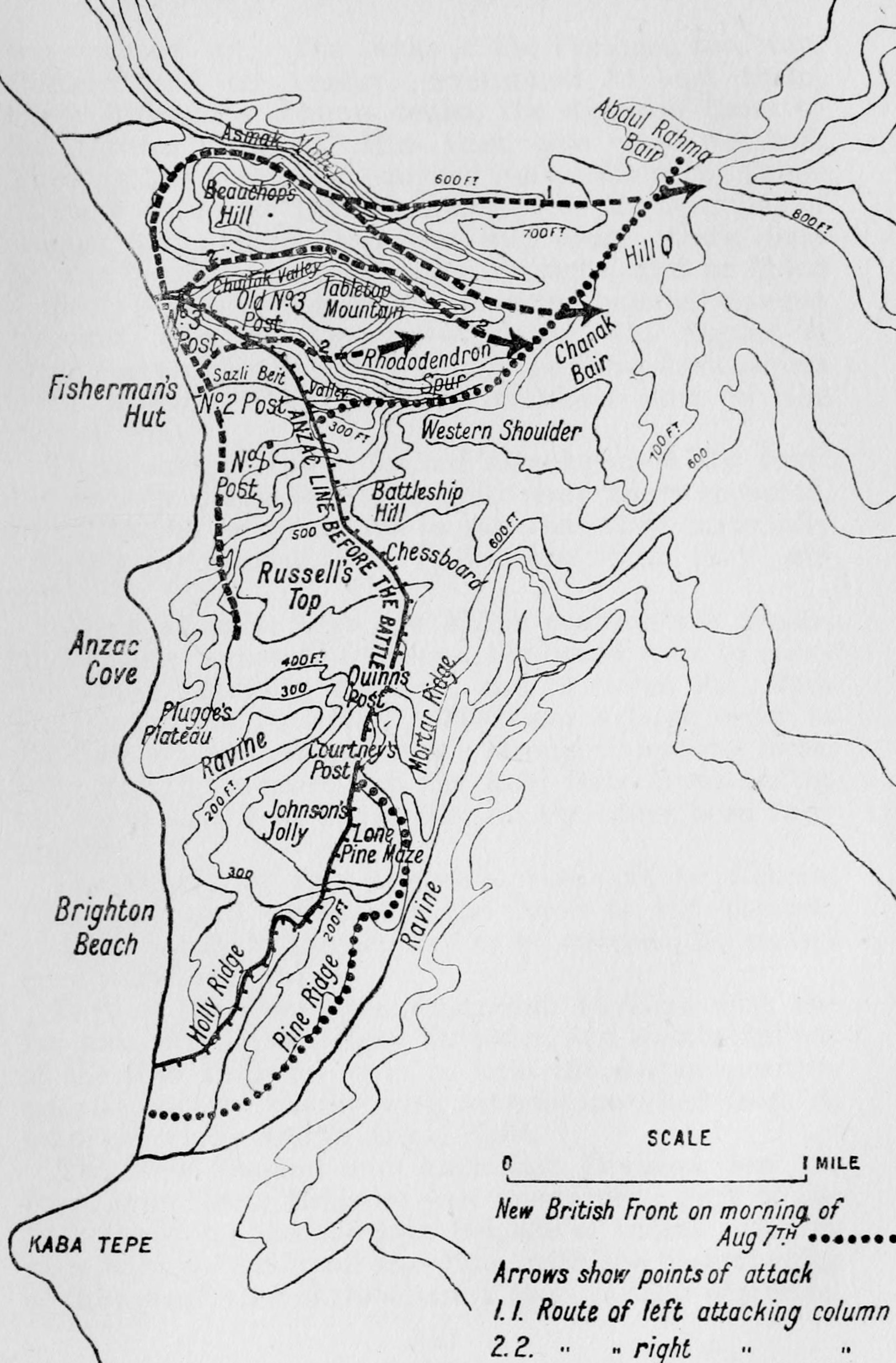
Battle of Sari Bair, showing the British attack, 6–8 August 1915

The approach to the peak was made along Rhododendron Spur, which ran from the beach to the peak of Chunuk Bair. The Ottomans had outposts at specific points along the spur: at the Table Top, Destroyer Hill and nearest the beach at Old No. 3 Outpost. There was also an Ottoman outpost on Bauchop's Hill to the north. All these outposts had to be cleared by the covering force, the four understrength regiments of the New Zealand Mounted Rifles Brigade, before the main assault column could proceed up the spur to the summit.

The Auckland Mounted Rifles cleared Old No. 3 Outpost and the Wellington Mounted Rifles took Destroyer Hill and the Table Top. The Otago Mounted Rifles and Canterbury Mounted Rifles captured Bauchop's Hill, which was named after the Otago's commander, Lieutenant Colonel Arthur Bauchop, who was killed during the attack. The fighting was heavy as the Ottomans had several machine guns in positions and the trenches were well protected. Ottoman wounded and prisoners were bayoneted after the fighting was over. In all the New Zealanders lost about 100 men in clearing the outposts. While the attack efforts were successful, the plan was now running two hours behind schedule, making it difficult to reach the summit before first light.

The advance was initially made up the valleys, or deres, on either side of Rhododendron Spur and once past the Table Top, the New Zealanders climbed onto the ridge, leaving about 1,000 yards (910 m) to travel to the summit.

The three battalions travelling along the north side of the spur were in position by 4:30 am, shortly before dawn. They advanced to a knoll dubbed "The Apex" which was only about 500 yards (460 m) from the summit where at the time there were only a handful of Ottoman infantry, about 20. The Canterbury battalion on the south side of the spur was lost and delayed. Overall commander of the attack, Colonel Johnston, made the decision to wait for the last battalion to arrive before making the attack, disobeying original orders to not halt for any reason.

The attack on Chunuk Bair was the main element in a wider offensive. At 4:30 am a supporting attack was planned at the Nek against Baby 700, intended to coincide with the New Zealanders attacking from Chunuk Bair down onto the rear of the Ottoman trenches on Battleship Hill. Despite the delay to the New Zealand attack, the Battle of the Nek went ahead nonetheless, with huge casualties.

=== Chunuk Bair (Çanak Bayırı/Conk Bayırı) ===
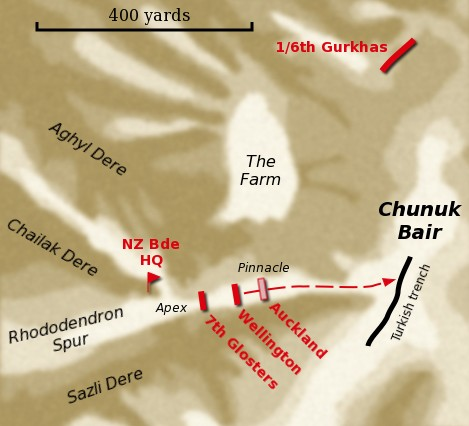
Assault on Chunuk Bair, 8 August

The opportunity for a swift victory at Chunuk Bair had been lost. With the failure of attack of the Nek and the realisation that Chunuk Bair was in danger of being overrun, the Ottomans reinforced the peak. At 7:30 am, the New Zealanders were just 500 yards (460 m) away from the summit, but Ottoman and German reinforcements started arriving in heavy numbers. The commander of the Ottoman 9th Division, German Lieutenant-Colonel Hans Kannengiesser, had reached the summit and was preparing its defence. Kemal, the Ottoman colonel who had warned of the possibility of an attack, arrived soon after Kannengiesser. He ordered several regiments to the area. By 10:00 am, the peaks had around 500 Ottoman reinforcements, whereas only hours ago, there had been just 20 sleeping soldiers. However, these reinforcements were spotted by Australian artillery observers, who pinned down movements by the Ottomans, some of whom fled down from the summit to better cover.

In daylight, after an exhausting climb and faced by stiffening opposition, the prospects for a New Zealand assault against the peak looked slim. Johnston requested to wait until nightfall. Nevertheless, General Godley ordered Johnston to attack.

Two hundred yards beyond where the New Zealanders were positioned on the Apex was another knoll called "The Pinnacle" from which it was a straight climb to the summit. Off the side of the spur to the north was a small, sheltered plateau known as The Farm.

Johnston told the Auckland battalion to attack and at 11:00 am, they did. About 100 made it as far as the Pinnacle, where they desperately tried to dig in. Around 300 fell as casualties between there and the Apex. Johnston told the Wellington battalion to continue the attack. The battalion's commander, Lieutenant Colonel William Malone refused, stating that he was not willing to order his men to carry out a hopeless attack. He said his battalion would take Chunuk Bair at night.

In 2018 New Zealand military historian Ian McGibbon challenged the "myth" that Colonel Malone had refused a direct order to make a daytime attack, holding that Malone and Johnston both disagreed with Godley's order for the Auckland Battalion to attack in daylight, which dissention Johnston had reluctantly accepted. McGibbon said that the sole claim that Malone refused a direct order was made by NCO Charlie Clark in 1981. Malone had argued with a British officer, Major Arthur Temperley, who was Johnston's brigade major but junior to Malone.

Two charges had been made before Godley finally called off the daytime attack. Hundreds of Anzacs lay dead and wounded before the peak.

Godley spent the rest of the day of 7 August devising a plan for another attack. He sent up reinforcements including the British 13th (Western) Division; the 7th Battalion of The Gloucestershire Regiment and the pioneers of 8th Battalion, the Welch Regiment, led by Lieutenant-Colonel Bald. The Auckland and Canterbury Infantry Battalions were removed from the plan of attack. They were replaced by the Otago and Wellington Infantry Battalions, which would lead the new attack. A 45-minute naval bombardment would start at 3:30 the next morning. Twelve machine guns would provide covering fire to the attacking forces.

Following a naval bombardment of the peak and a delay, the Wellingtons, followed by the Gloucesters, reached Chunuk Bair virtually unopposed. The preceding barrage had driven most of the Ottoman defenders away as the ground was too hard and rocky for deep entrenchments.

Chunuk Bair was hard to defend. It was only possible to scrape shallow trenches amongst the rocks, and the peak was exposed to fire from the main Ottoman line on Battleship Hill to the south and from Hill Q to the north. If the original plan for the offensive had worked, Hill Q would have been in Allied hands. Allanson's battalion of Gurkhas reached it briefly the following day but were in no position to offer relief to the troops on Chunuk Bair.

By 5:00 am, the Ottomans counter-attacked the Wellingtonians. The slope of the hill was so steep that the Ottomans could get within 22 yards (20 m) of the trenches without being seen. The New Zealanders fought desperately to hold off the Ottomans, firing their rifles and those of their fallen companions until the wood of the stock was too hot to touch. When the Ottomans got up to the trenches, the fighting continued with the bayonet. The Ottomans overran part of the New Zealand trench and took some prisoners. In full daylight, reinforcements were only reaching the summit at a trickle.

The fight raged all day until the trenches were clogged with the New Zealand dead. Around 5:00 pm, Malone was killed by a misdirected artillery shell, fired from either Anzac artillery or a British ship.

The Ottomans had reclaimed the east side of the summit and were reinforced by the arrival of the 8th Division from Helles. As the extent of the Allied offensive became apparent, General Otto Liman von Sanders, the commander of the Ottoman forces in the Dardanelles, appointed his most competent officer, Colonel Mustafa Kemal, the commander for the defence of Suvla and Sari Bair.

As darkness fell on the evening of 8 August, the fighting subsided and the Wellington Battalion was relieved. Out of the 760 men of the battalion who had reached the summit, 711 had become casualties. Whereas Malone had resisted sending his men on a suicidal charge when told to follow the Auckland Battalion on 7 August, a day later the outcome would be the same. The New Army battalions had also suffered greatly. There were 417 casualties amongst the Welch pioneers and 350 amongst the Gloucesters, including all the officers of the battalion. For the wounded, the suffering was only beginning. Some took three days to travel from the higher reaches of Rhododendron Spur to the beach, a little over a kilometre away.

=== The Farm ===
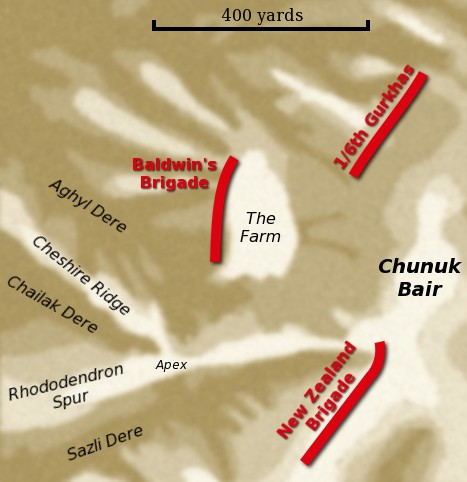
British positions on 9 August

Godley remained at his headquarters near the beach, largely ignorant of the state of the fighting. His plan for 9 August was to take Hill Q. The main force for the assault was a brigade commanded by Brigadier-General Anthony Baldwin. Baldwin commanded the 38th Brigade of the 13th Division but the situation was so confused that the force he led towards Hill Q contained only one of his normal battalions, the 6th East Lancashires. He also had the 9th Worcestershires and 9th Warwicks from the 39th Brigade and the 5th Wiltshires from the 40th Brigade (who would later be redirected to reinforce Chunuk Bair). Plus he led two 10th (Irish) Division battalions; the 10th Hampshires and 6th Royal Irish Rifles from the 29th Brigade. Most of the 10th Division had landed at Suvla on 7 August.

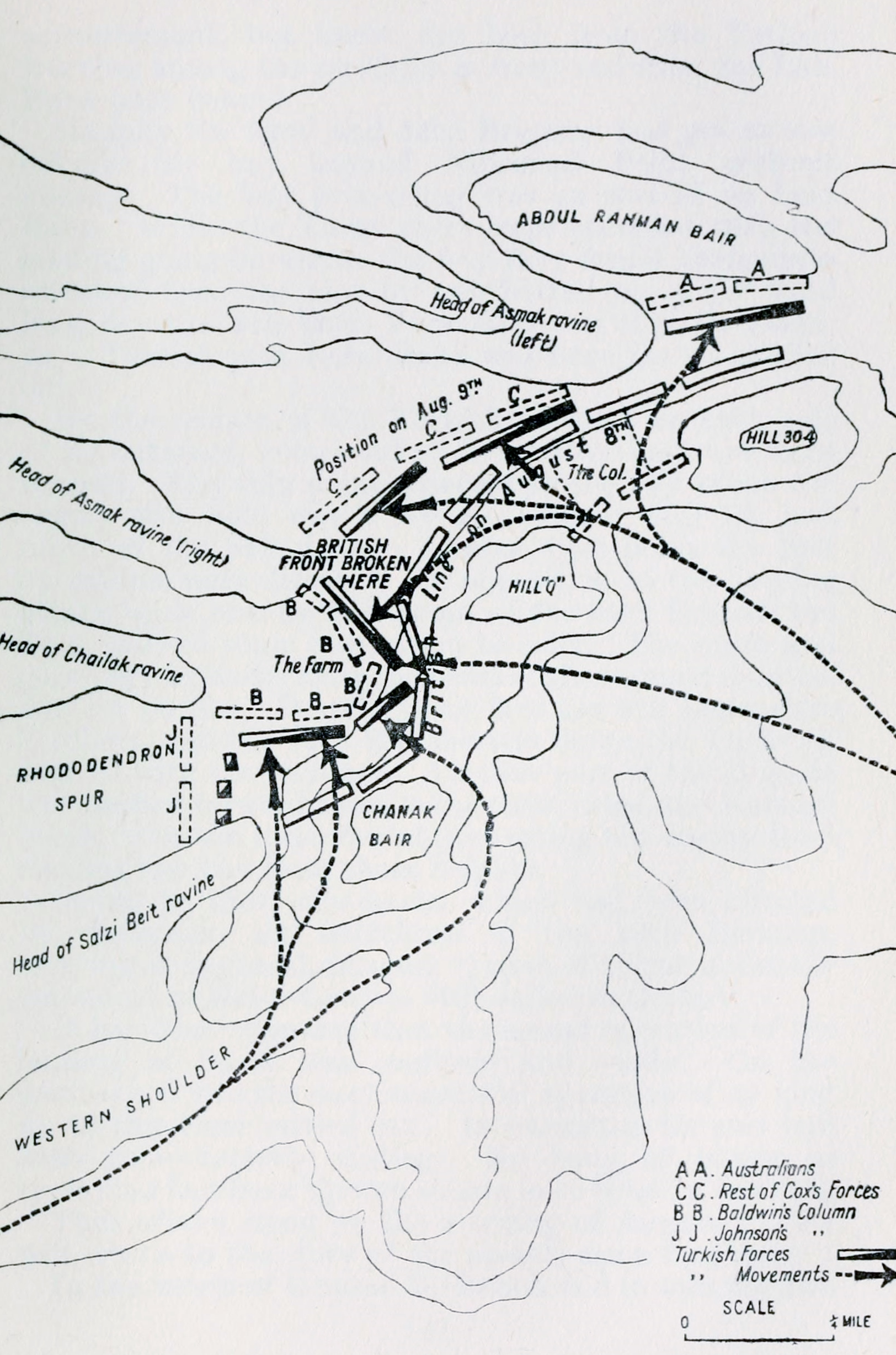
Battle of Sari Bair, showing the Turkish counter-attack, 9–10 August 1915

This force would climb to Hill Q from the Farm. At the same time, the New Zealanders on the right from Chunuk Bair and units of General Herbert Cox's Indian Brigade on the left would also attack the hill. The plan failed when Baldwin's battalions became lost in the dark trying to find the Farm which they did not reach until after dawn, around 6:00 am. The only force to reach Hill Q was Allanson's battalion of Gurkhas. They suffered the same fate as Colonel Malone, shelled by their own artillery, and their stay on the hill was brief.

With the offensive once again stalled, the New Zealanders on Chunuk Bair had to endure another day of Ottoman harassment. As night fell the remaining New Zealanders moved back to the Apex and were replaced by two New Army battalions, the 6th Battalion of the South Lancashire Regiment and some of the 5th Battalion of the Wiltshire Regiment from Baldwin's force.

On the morning of 10 August Mustafa Kemal led an overwhelming Ottoman counter-attack. If Chunuk Bair, the one Allied success of the August offensive, was recaptured, the battle was effectively over. His plan lacked subtlety but was brutally effective – overrun the defenders by sheer weight of numbers. Mustafa Kemal had stopped the advance of IX Corps at Suvla, with a counter-attack at dawn on 9 August and late in the day reconnoitred Chunuk Bair and planned an attack with six battalions.

There were about 2,000 defenders on or below the summit of Chunuk Bair. Baldwin's brigade at the Farm numbered a further 3,000. The Ottomans swept over the Lancashire battalion on the summit, few of whom survived (510 men were reported missing). The Wiltshires were unarmed and un-equipped and were scattered everywhere. On the right flank, the Ottomans captured the Pinnacle, driving the New Army troops before them. New Zealand machine gunners positioned at the Apex shot down the Ottomans as they tried to continue down the spur. The gunners could not discriminate friend from foe and killed many New Army troops who were amongst the charging Ottomans, as the Leinsters were rushed up to the Apex to reinforce. At the north side of Rhododendron Spur, the Ottomans descended from Chunuk Bair to the small plateau of the Farm and overran Baldwin's brigade, the Warwicks being almost annihilated, the 6th Royal Irish Rifles losing half its number and Baldwin being killed; the survivors retreating to Cheshire Ridge. The Turkish infantry were exhausted and fell back to the main ridge and the Farm plateau became part of no man's land.

== Aftermath ==
=== Analysis ===
The loss of Chunuk Bair marked the end of the Battle of Sari Bair. Fighting would continue elsewhere until August 29 but there would be no more attempts to capture the heights. The Apex formed the new front line on Rhododendron Spur. In 1919 burial teams found the Farm still covered in the bones of the men from Baldwin's brigade; their remains were interred in The Farm Commonwealth War Graves Commission Cemetery when it was constructed on the site after the Armistice.

=== Casualties ===
Charles Bean, the Australian official historian, wrote that the Ottomans had 9,200 casualties in four days at Chunuk Bair and Hill 971, from 1,800–2,000 on the 19th Division sector around Baby 700 and the top of Monash Valley and 6,930 losses in the 16th Division, mainly at Lone Pine. The total of Ottoman casualties at Anzac was about 18,000 men and British casualties were 12,000–13,000 men.

== Commemoration ==
A memorial arch, the Malone Memorial Gate, commemorating Lieutenant-Colonel Malone was constructed in Stratford, New Zealand in 1923 and a plaque unveiled in the New Zealand Parliament's Grand Hall in 2005. A memorial to honour New Zealand soldiers who died in the campaign was unveiled on Chunuk Bair in May 1925.

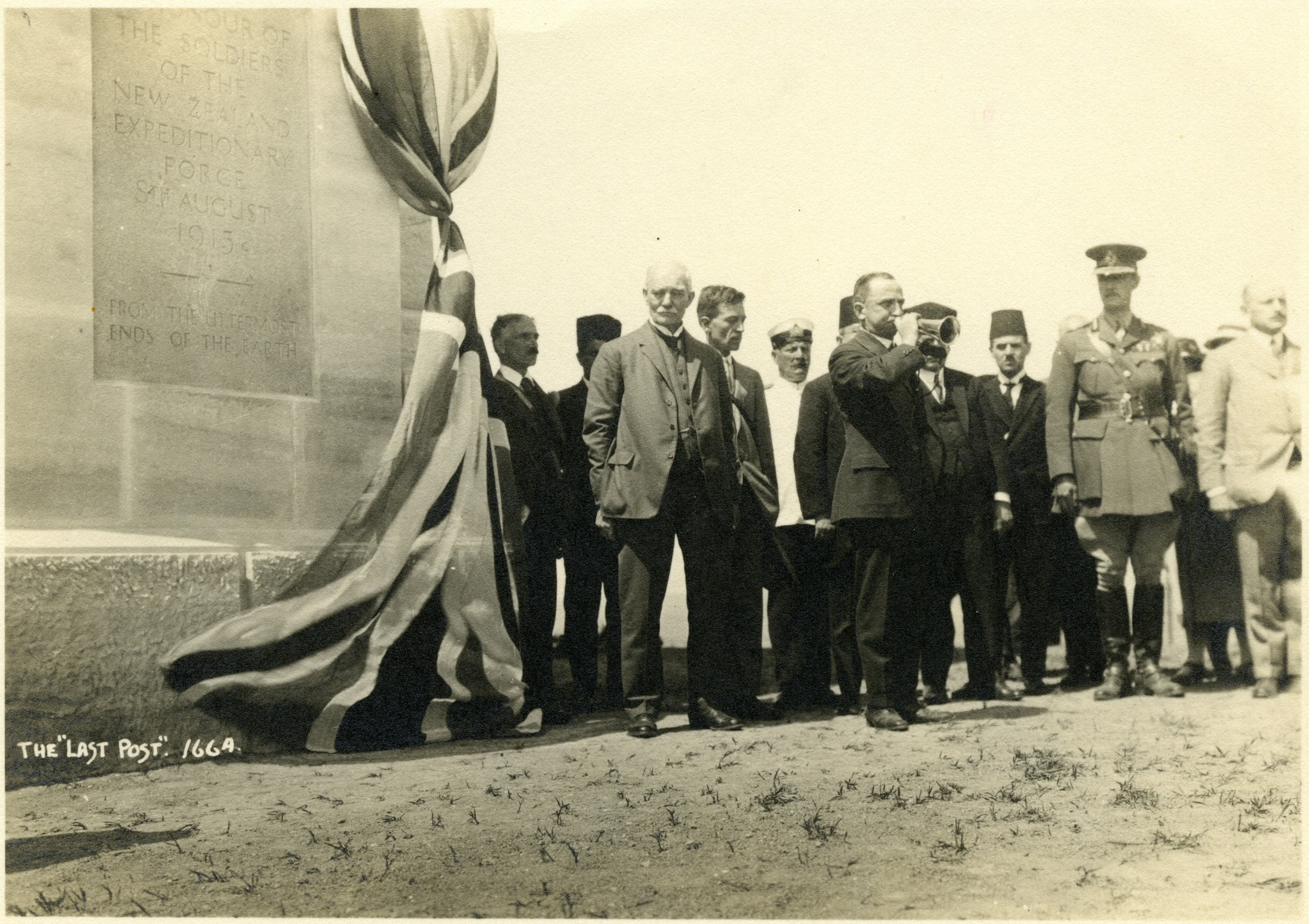
12 May 1925 – Unveiling of Chunuk Bair Memorial

=== Victoria Cross ===
One Victoria Cross was awarded for actions at Chunuk Bair to Corporal Cyril Bassett, who repaired phone lines while under fire.

== Appearances in popular culture ==
New Zealand writer Maurice Shadbolt produced a play Once on Chunuk Bair in 1982. A film version Chunuk Bair (Daybreak Pictures) was released in 1991. There is a detailed fictional description of the battle from the point of view of an Ottoman Turkish soldier in Birds Without Wings by Louis de Bernieres, author of Captain Corelli's Mandolin.

Once on Chunuk Bair was performed on the 100th anniversary of the Battle of Chunuk Bair in Christchurch, New Zealand. It was directed by Martin Howells. (see https://ww100.govt.nz/performance-of-'once-on-chunuk-bair'-christchurch)

Once on Chunuk Bair was performed on August 8th 2015, on the 100th anniversary of the battle, by the Mana Little Theatre in Plimmerton, Wellington to an audience composed largely of many Veterans. It was directed by Paulette McIndoe. The performance won (Wellington) Antoinette Awards for Best New Director (Paulette McIndoe), Best Drama, Best Set Design, Commendation for Best Supporting Actor (Craig Haywood as Sgt. Frank), Commendation for Best Ensemble, National Award: The David Brockett Award for Backstage Achievement Sue Miller for Costumes ( https://manalittletheatre.org.nz/awards/}} )

Composer Dwayne Bloomfield was in 2001 inspired by this battle to write the original work for brass band Behold the Narrows from the Hill describing the battle. This was the first of several brass band works he has composed commemorating the contributions of New Zealand and Australian forces to particular First World War battles.

Musician PJ Harvey sings about the aftermath of this battle in the song "On Battleship Hill" from her 2011 album Let England Shake.

The Battle of Chunuk Bair was featured in the Gallipoli miniseries in 2015.
