= Couin =

- Commune
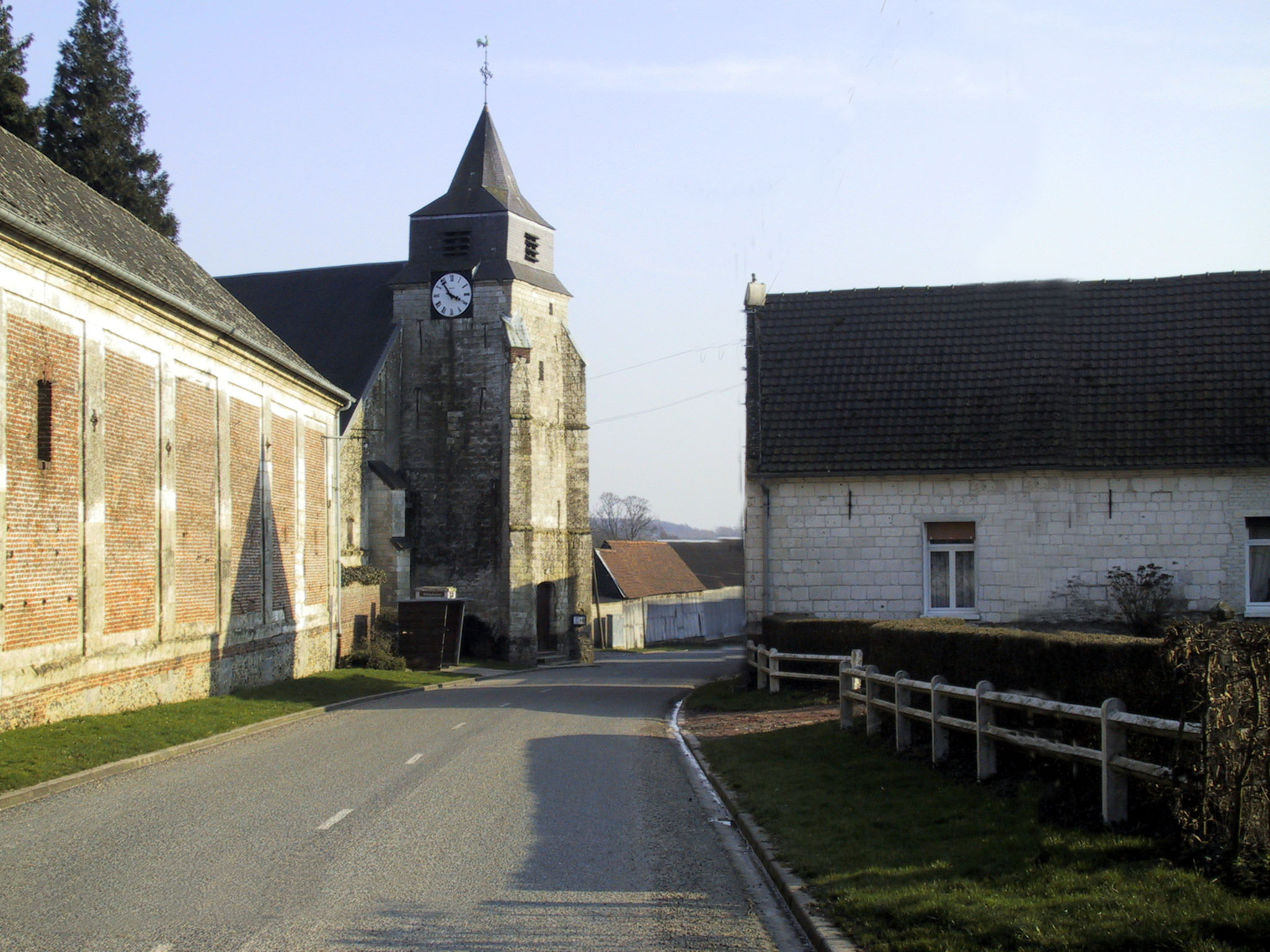
- The church of Couin

- Coat of arms
- Location of Couin
- Location within France Location within Hauts-de-France
- Coordinates: 50°07′50″N 2°33′09″E
- Country: France
- Region: Hauts-de-France
- Department: Pas-de-Calais
- Arrondissement: Arras
- Canton: Avesnes-le-Comte
- Intercommunality: CC Campagnes de l'Artois

Government
  - Mayor (2020–2026): Vincent Lacroix
- Area^{1}: 5.82 km^{2} (2.25 sq mi)
- Elevation: 135 m (443 ft)
- Highest elevation: 159 m (522 ft)
- Lowest elevation: 90 m (300 ft)
- Population (2023): 76
  - Density: 13/km^{2} (34/sq mi)
- Time zone: UTC+01:00 (CET)
  - Summer (DST): UTC+02:00 (CEST)
- INSEE/Postal code: 62242 /62760
- ^{1} French Land Register data, which excludes lakes, ponds, glaciers > 1 km^{2} (0.386 sq mi or 247 acres) and river estuaries.

Couin (French pronunciation: [kwɛ̃]) is a commune in the Pas-de-Calais department in the Hauts-de-France region of France 16 miles (25 km) southwest of Arras by the banks of the river Authie.

== Population ==
Historical population
| Year | Pop. | ±% p.a. |
|---|---|---|
| 1968 | 90 | — |
| 1975 | 91 | +0.16% |
| 1982 | 79 | −2.00% |
| 1990 | 71 | −1.33% |
| 1999 | 90 | +2.67% |
| 2007 | 129 | +4.60% |
| 2012 | 100 | −4.97% |
| 2017 | 113 | +2.47% |
| 2023 | 76 | −6.40% |
Source: INSEE

== See also ==
- Communes of the Pas-de-Calais department
