= George Sellars =

New Zealand rugby union player

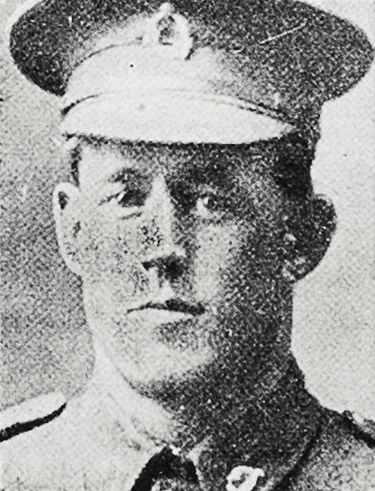
- Born: 16 April 1886 Auckland, New Zealand
- Died: 7 June 1917 (age 31) Messines, Belgium
- Height: 1.75 m (5 ft 9 in)
- Weight: 76 kg (12.0 st)
- School: Napier Street School (Auckland)

Rugby union career
- Position: Hooker
Amateur team(s)
Years	Team	Apps	(Points)
1906–14	Ponsonby		
Provincial / State sides
Years	Team	Apps	(Points)
1909–1914	Auckland	29	
1912	North Island	1	
International career
Years	Team	Apps	(Points)
1913	New Zealand	15	(6)
1912, 1914	New Zealand Māori		

George Maurice Victor Sellars (16 April 1886 – 7 June 1917) was a rugby union player who represented New Zealand fifteen times, including two Test matches. He played club rugby for Ponsonby, and was first selected for Auckland in 1910, and in 1912 gained international selection for New Zealand Māori. Sellars was selected for the All Blacks – as New Zealand's international team is known – for their 1913 tour of North America where he played fourteen matches. As well, he was also in the All Blacks' side that played Australia immediately prior to their tour. Although unavailable to play for New Zealand the following year, he did represent the Māori again that season. In 1915 Sellars enlisted for service in the First World War, and he was fatally wounded in 1917 at the Battle of Messines. He has no known grave and his name is among those recorded on the Messines Ridge (New Zealand) Memorial, at the Messines Ridge British Cemetery.

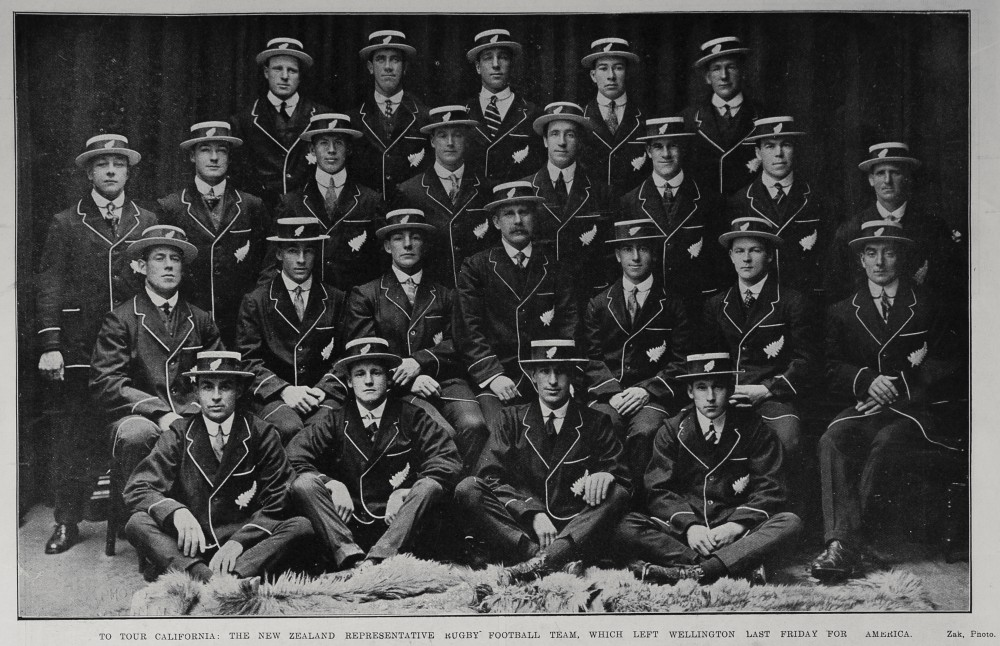
The New Zealand team before their departure to North America in 1913. Sellars is sitting in the second row on the far left.

== See also ==
- List of international rugby union players killed in World War I
