= Otago Mounted Rifles Regiment =

Otago Mounted Rifle Regiment
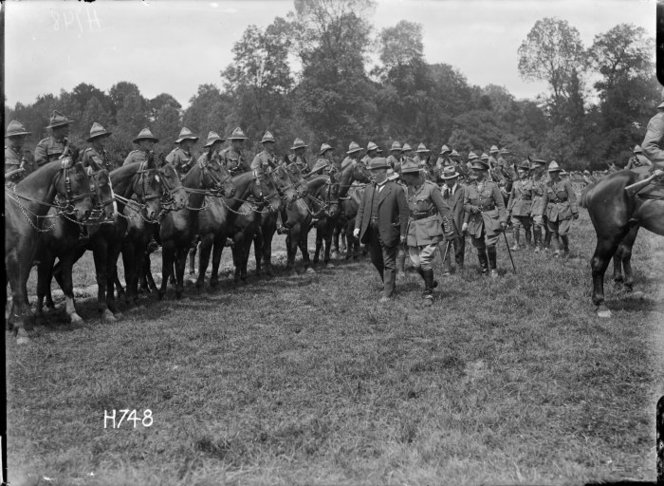
- Prime Minister William Massey and Sir Joseph Ward inspect the Otago Mounted Rifles, France, 3 July 1918
- Active: 1911–1921
- Country: New Zealand
- Allegiance: New Zealand Crown
- Branch: New Zealand Army
- Role: Mounted
- Size: Regiment
- Part of: New Zealand Mounted Rifles Brigade; New Zealand Division
- Engagements: Great War

Commanders
- Notable commanders: Arthur Bauchop

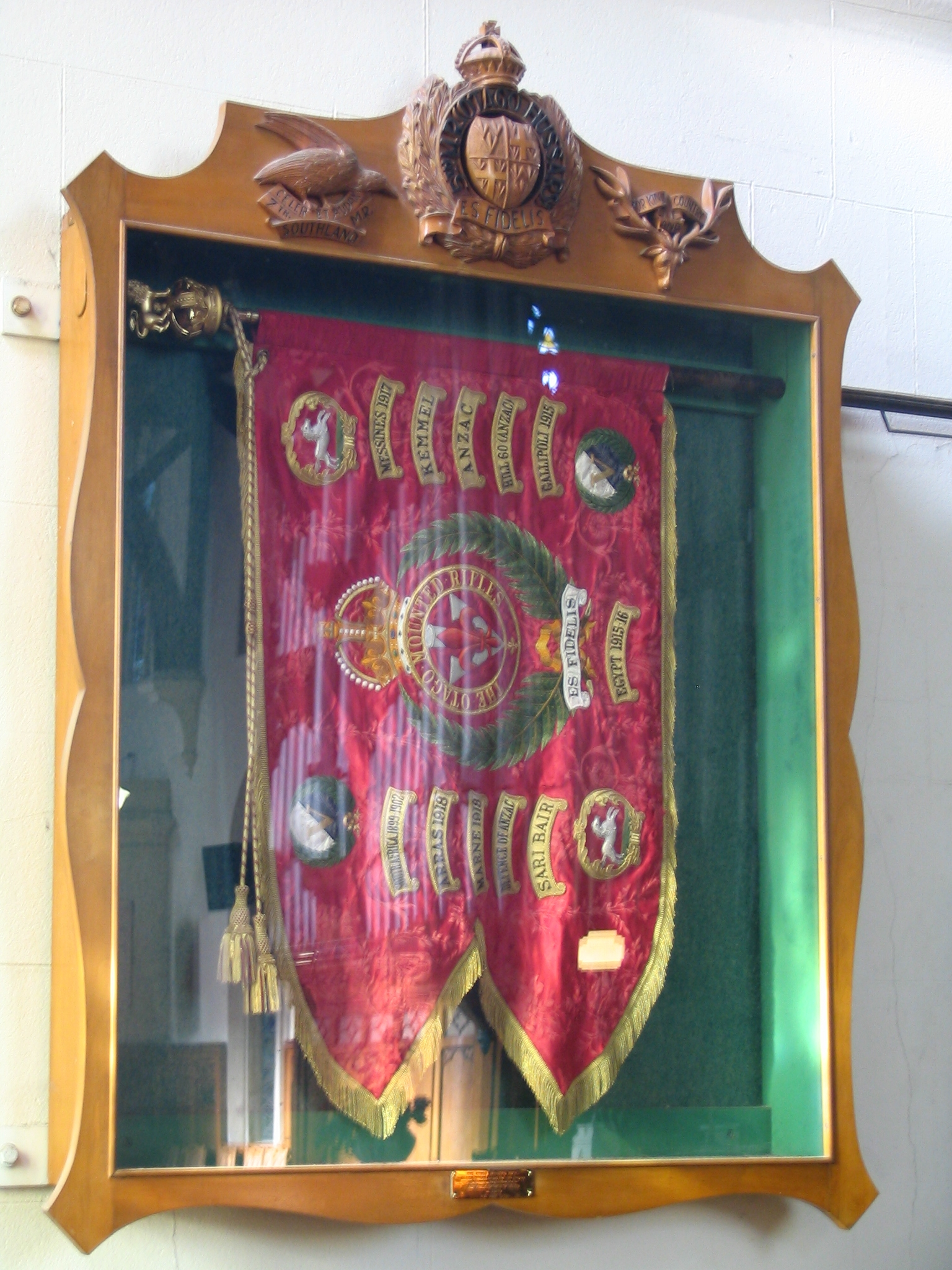
Regimental Guidon of the Otago Mounted Rifle Regiment in First Church of Otago, Dunedin, listing eleven battle honours

The Otago Mounted Rifle Regiment was a New Zealand Mounted Regiment formed for service during World War I. It was formed from units of the Territorial Force consisting of the 5th Mounted Rifles (Otago Hussars), the 7th (Southland) Mounted Rifles and the 12th (Otago) Mounted Rifles. They saw service during the Battle of Gallipoli, with the New Zealand Mounted Rifles Brigade and was later withdrawn to Egypt. They later left the brigade and served in France with the New Zealand Division becoming the only New Zealand Mounted troops to serve in France.

== World War I Battles ==
- Battle of Gallipoli
- Battle of Flers - Courcelette. 15–22 Sep 1916.
- Battle of Morval. 25–28 Sep 1916.
- Battle of Le Transloy. 1–18 Oct 1916.
- Battle of Messines. 7–14 Jun 1917.
- Battle of Polygon Wood. 26 Sep – 3 Oct 1917.
- Battle of Broodseinde. 4 Oct 1917.
- Battle of Passchendaele. 12 Oct 1917.
- Battle of Arras. 28 Mar 1918.
- Battle of the Ancre. 5 Apr 1918.
- Battle of Albert. 21–23 Aug 1918.
- Battle of Bapaume. 31 Aug – 3 Sep 1918.
- Battle of Havrincourt. 12 Sep 1918.
- Battle of the Canal du Nord. 27 Sep – 1 Oct 1918.
- Battle of Cambrai. 8–9 Oct 1918.
- Pursuit to the Selle. 9–12 Oct 1918.
- Battle of the Selle. 17–25 Oct 1918.
- Battle of the Sambre. 4 Nov 1918, including the Capture of Le Quesnoy.

== See also ==
- Otago Infantry Regiment (NZEF)
