= Ranfurly Shield 2000–2009 =

Trophy in New Zealand's domestic rugby union competition

Ranfurly Shield
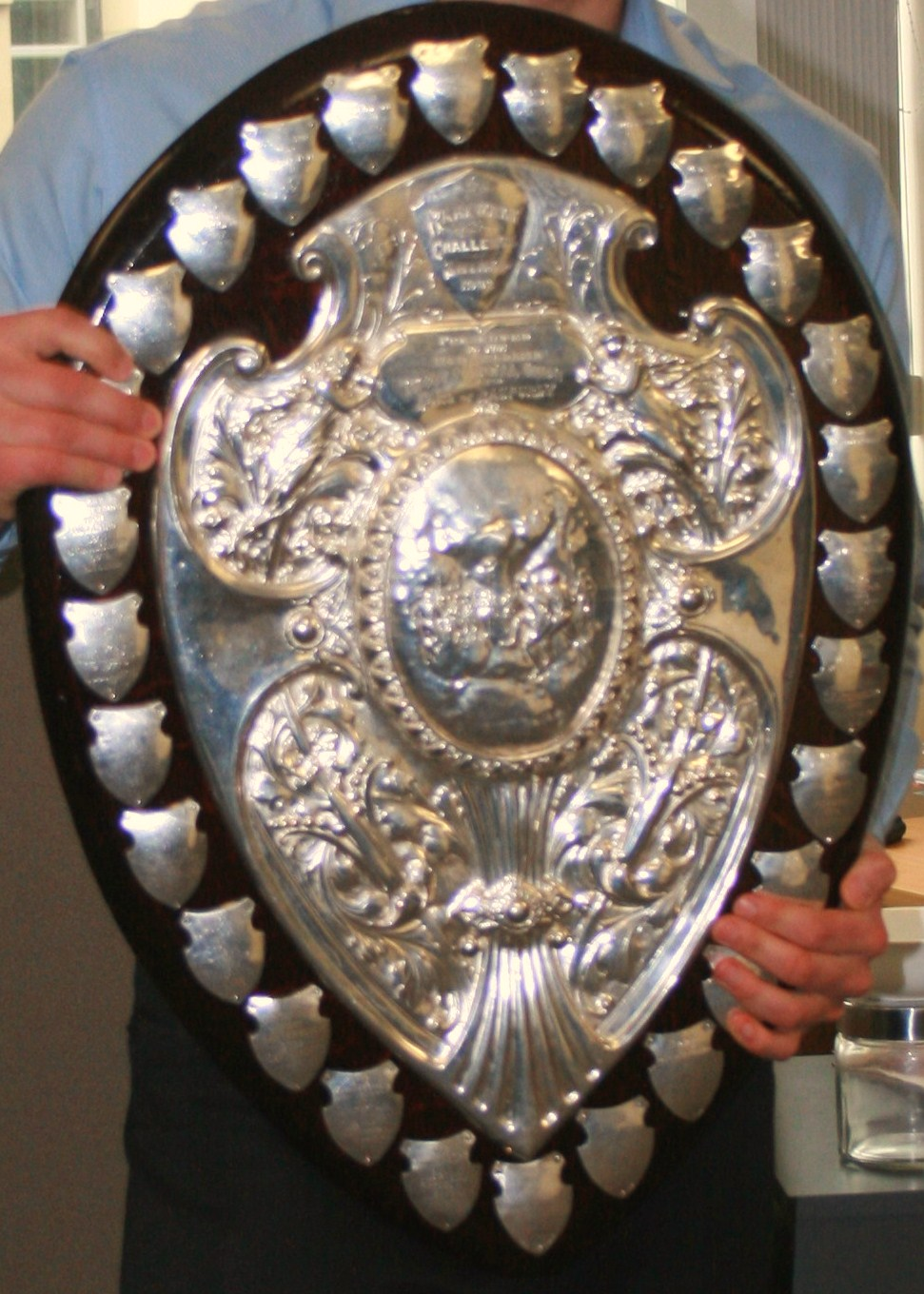
- Countries: New Zealand

Official website
- www.mitre10cup.co.nz/Competition/RanfurlyShield

The Ranfurly Shield, colloquially known as the Log o' Wood, is perhaps the most prestigious trophy in New Zealand's domestic rugby union competition. First played for in 1904, the Ranfurly Shield is based on a challenge system, rather than a league or knockout competition as with most football trophies. The holding union must defend the Shield in challenge matches, and if a challenger defeats them, they become the new holder of the Shield.

Waikato opened the decade with the Ranfurly Shield defending it successfully 21 times prior to losing it. The shield changed hands 11 times throughout the decade, Canterbury notably winning the shield four separate times, but ultimately losing it to Auckland, North Harbour, Auckland again, and finally Southland, who held the shield at the close of the decade.

The Bay of Plenty and Wellington were also involved with short Shield stints during the decade – both beating Auckland at Eden Park, but also both falling to Canterbury. North Harbour secured The Shield for the first time in beating Canterbury, however gave The Shield to a strong Waikato side after three defences.

== Fixtures ==
=== 2000 ===
6 July 2000

West Coast	3–99	Waikato

Rugby Park, Greymouth

12 July 2000

North Otago	17–95	Waikato

Whitestone Contracting Stadium, Oamaru

22 July 2000

Waikato	86–3	Wanganui

Tokaroa Memorial Sports Ground, Tokoroa

19 August 2000

Waikato	52–14	Northland

Waikato Stadium, Hamilton

2 September 2000

Waikato	44–36	Southland

Waikato Stadium, Hamilton

9 September 2000

Waikato	24–11	North Harbour

Waikato Stadium, Hamilton

Waikato finally succumbed to the pressure of Ranfurly shield rugby after valiantly defending the shield 21 times, a run of games stretching back to 1997

23 September 2000

Waikato	18–26	Canterbury

Waikato Stadium, Hamilton

1 October 2000

Canterbury	29–26	Otago

Jade Stadium, Christchurch

6 October 2000

Canterbury	28–22	Northland

Jade Stadium, Christchurch

=== 2001 ===
11 July 2001

Canterbury	69–3	Buller

Jade Stadium, Christchurch

18 July 2001

Canterbury	103–0	South Canterbury

Jade Stadium, Christchurch

4 August 2001

Canterbury	67–10	Nelson Bays

Jade Stadium, Christchurch

25 August 2001

Canterbury	72–3	Bay of Plenty

Jade Stadium, Christchurch

22 September 2001

Canterbury	31–29	Wellington

Jade Stadium, Christchurch

5 October 2001

Canterbury	38–17	Taranaki

Jade Stadium, Christchurch

12 October 2001

Canterbury	38–10	Auckland

Jade Stadium, Christchurch

19 October 2001

Canterbury	52–19	Waikato

Jade Stadium, Christchurch

=== 2002 ===
17 July 2002

Marlborough	24–85	Canterbury

Lansdowne Park, Blenheim

24 July 2002

Mid Canterbury	10-78	Canterbury

Ashburton Showgrounds, Ashburton

9 August 2002

Canterbury	51–06	East Coast

Jade Stadium, Christchurch

31 August 2002

Canterbury	48–27	Southland

Jade Stadium, Christchurch

13 September 2002

Canterbury	44–17	Northland

Jade Stadium, Christchurch

28 September 2002

Canterbury	65–10	North Harbour

Jade Stadium, Christchurch

12 October 2002

Canterbury	16–13	Otago

Jade Stadium, Christchurch

=== 2003 ===
2 July 2003

North Otago	24–85	Canterbury

Centennial Park, Oamaru

9 July 2003

Hawke's Bay	14–76	Canterbury

McLean Park, Napier

24 August 2003

Canterbury	31–26	Bay of Plenty

Jade Stadium, Christchurch

30 August 2003

Canterbury	32–27	Taranaki

Jade Stadium, Christchurch

20 September 2003

Canterbury	35–24	Waikato

Jade Stadium, Christchurch

27 September 2003

Canterbury	38–38	Wellington

Jade Stadium, Christchurch

After 23 successive shield defences Canterbury fall to long time rivals Auckland – a dominant performance in Christchurch, sees The Shield head to Auckland

11 October 2003

Canterbury	31–40	Auckland

Jade Stadium, Christchurch

=== 2004 ===
28 July 2004

Auckland	67–3	Poverty Bay

Eden Park, Auckland

1 August 2004

Auckland	100–15	Counties Manukau

Eden Park, Auckland

A shock upset in Auckland after only two defences, as the Steamers claim their first Ranfurly Shield victory, a historic win at the hallowed turf of Eden Park

15 August 2004

Auckland	28–33	Bay of Plenty

Eden Park, Auckland

22 August 2004

Bay of Plenty	26–20	Waikato

Baypark, Mount Maunganui

After a brilliant home defence over staunch local rivals Waikato, the Steamers fall to Canterbury as the Red and Black take the Shield back down south

5 September 2004

Bay of Plenty	26–33	Canterbury

Baypark, Mount Maunganui

18 September 2004

Canterbury	52–13	Southland

Jade Stadium, Christchurch

9 October 2004

Canterbury	68–19	Northland

Jade Stadium, Christchurch

=== 2005 ===
22 June 2005

Canterbury	67–3	Marlborough

Jade Stadium, Christchurch

12 July 2005

Canterbury	85–0	Nelson Bays

Jade Stadium, Christchurch

20 August 2005

Canterbury	40–13	Bay of Plenty

Jade Stadium, Christchurch

3 September 2005

Canterbury	13–11	Taranaki

Jade Stadium, Christchurch

17 September 2005

Canterbury	23–15	Waikato

Jade Stadium, Christchurch

23 September 2005

Canterbury	15–14	Wellington

Jade Stadium, Christchurch

8 October 2005

Canterbury	27–12	Auckland

Jade Stadium, Christchurch

=== 2006 ===
4 July 2006

South Canterbury	15–80	Canterbury

Fraser Park, Timaru

11 July 2006

Canterbury	96–10	Wairarapa Bush

Jade Stadium, Christchurch

18 August 2006

Canterbury	24–7	Southland

Jade Stadium, Christchurch

2 September 2006

Canterbury	22–17	Otago

Jade Stadium, Christchurch

10 September 2006

Canterbury	32–16	Counties Manukau

Jade Stadium, Christchurch

Christchurch is the home of upsets as North Harbour win The Shield for the first time in 11 attempts in its 21 year history as a rugby province

24 September 2006

Canterbury	17–21	North Harbour

Jade Stadium, Christchurch

=== 2007 ===
30 August 2007

North Harbour	69–0	Thames Valley

North Harbour Stadium, Albany

14 July 2007

North Harbour	99–6	Horowhenua Kapiti

North Harbour Stadium, Albany

4 August 2007

North Harbour	19–13	Taranaki

North Harbour Stadium, Albany

North Harbour's historic first run of three shield defences comes to a crunching halt by a simply dominant Waikato displaying electric attacking rugby

25 August 2007

North Harbour	7–52	Waikato

North Harbour Stadium, Albany

Ultimately it would not be a successful shield reign for the Mooloos as Canterbury went on to claim the Shield back after just over a year without it

1 September 2007

Waikato	20–33	Canterbury

Waikato Stadium, Hamilton

7 September 2007

Canterbury	44–6	Hawke's Bay

Jade Stadium, Christchurch

An Auckland team victory concluded Canterbury's sequence of Ranfurly Shield defenses matching the double-digit figures recorded earlier in the decade.

29 September 2007

Canterbury	15–26	Auckland

Jade Stadium, Christchurch

=== 2008 ===
15 July 2008

Poverty Bay	3–54	Auckland

More FM Rugby Park, Gisborne

22 July 2008

North Otago	3–113	Auckland

Centennial Park, Oamaru

10 August 2008

Auckland	22–6	Taranaki

Eden Park, Auckland

23 August 2008

Auckland	25–3	Manawatu

Eden Park, Auckland

6 September 2008

Auckland	13–9	Southland

Eden Park, Auckland

On the weekend of Auckland Rugby's 125th anniversary, a dominant Wellington side broke Gull hearts, and its own 26-year drought stretching back to 1982

20 September 2008

Auckland	0–27	Wellington

Eden Park, Auckland

27 September 2009

Wellington	26–20	Tasman

Westpac Stadium, Wellington

=== 2009 ===
2 July 2009

Wairarapa Bush	19–90	Wellington

Memorial Park, Masterton

9 July 2009

Wanganui	6–61	Wellington

Cooks Gardens, Whanganui

31 July 2009

Wellington	23–19	Otago

Westpac Stadium, Wellington

22 August 2009

Wellington	16–15	Auckland

Westpac Stadium, Wellington

In just under two years after losing The Shield to Auckland, Canterbury regain it after a dominant performance in the Capital, outclassing Wellington

29 August 2009

Wellington	14–36	Canterbury

Westpac Stadium, Wellington

12 September 2009

Canterbury	36–14	Otago

AMI Stadium, Christchurch

18 September 2009

Canterbury	29–17	Taranaki

AMI Stadium, Christchurch

26 September 2009

Canterbury	31–21	Northland

AMI Stadium, Christchurch

9 October 2009

Canterbury	50–26	Manawatu

AMI Stadium, Christchurch

Christchurch was again host to a mighty upset as Southland regained the Shield for the fifth time in their history after a 50-year hiatus stretching back to 1959

22 October 2009

Canterbury	3–9	Southland

AMI Stadium, Christchurch

== See also ==
- Rugby union in New Zealand
- Hanan Shield
- Mitre 10 Cup
