= 1984 National Provincial Championship =

New Zealand rugby union tournament in 1984

The 1984 season was the ninth year of the National Provincial Championship (NPC), a provincial rugby union competition in New Zealand. Auckland were the winners of Division 1.

== Division 1 ==
The following table gives the final standings:

Relegated to Division Two

Pos	Team	Pld	W	D	L	PF	PA	PD	Pts
1	Auckland	10	9	0	1	434	73	+361	18
2	Canterbury	10	8	1	1	215	126	+89	17
3	Wellington	10	7	0	3	288	171	+117	14
4	Otago	10	7	0	3	195	150	+45	14
5	Counties	10	5	0	5	181	168	+13	10
6	Waikato	10	5	0	5	236	231	+5	10
7	Manawatu	10	4	1	5	112	203	-91	8
8	Wairarapa Bush	10	3	0	7	119	227	-108	6
9	North Auckland	10	3	0	7	100	237	-137	6
10	Bay of Plenty	10	2	0	8	110	232	-122	4
11	Hawke's Bay	10	1	0	9	134	300	-166	2

== Division 2 (North Island) ==
The following table gives the final standings:

Pos	Team	Pld	W	D	L	PF	PA	PD	Pts
1	Taranaki	6	6	0	0	255	45	180	12
2	Wanganui	6	5	0	1	179	97	+82	10
3	King Country	6	4	0	2	205	78	+127	8
4	Thames Valley	6	3	0	3	101	140	-39	6
5	East Coast	6	2	0	4	47	168	-121	4
6	Horowhenua	6	1	0	5	59	174	-115	2
7	Poverty Bay	6	0	0	6	52	196	-144	0

== Division 2 (South Island) ==
The following table gives the final standings:

Pos	Team	Pld	W	D	L	PF	PA	PD	Pts
1	Southland	7	7	0	0	185	43	+142	14
2	Marlborough	7	5	0	2	179	97	+82	10
3	West Coast	7	4	1	2	85	135	-50	9
4	Mid Canterbury	7	4	1	2	89	71	+18	9
5	Buller	7	3	0	4	82	121	-39	6
6	South Canterbury	7	2	0	5	90	107	-17	4
7	Nelson Bays	7	2	0	5	103	115	-12	4
8	North Otago	7	0	0	7	42	228	-186	0

== Promotion/relegation ==
Division Two South winner Southland defeated Division Two North winner Taranaki 15 points to 10 in the playoff match. Southland then challenged Hawke's Bay and won 23 points to 3 to be promoted to Division One for the 1985 season.
