= Ranfurly Shield 1980–1989 =

Ranfurly Shield
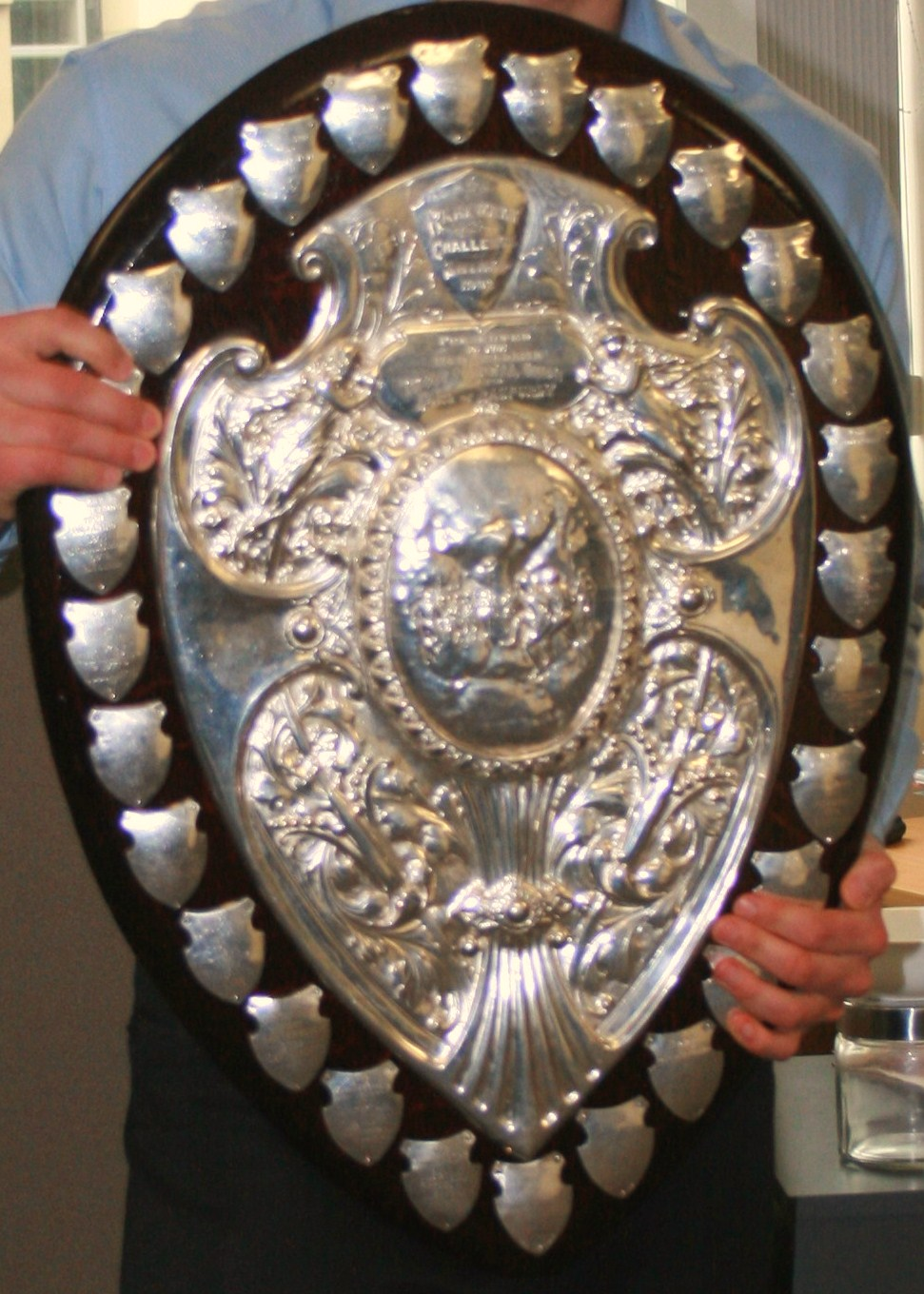
- Countries: New Zealand

Official website
- www.provincial.rugby/ranfurly-shield/

The Ranfurly Shield, colloquially known as the Log o' Wood, is a trophy in New Zealand's domestic rugby union competition. First played for in 1904, the Ranfurly Shield is based on a challenge system, rather than a league or knockout competition as with most football trophies. The holding union must defend the Shield in challenge matches, and if a challenger defeats them, they become the new holder of the Shield.

The '80s saw the shield change hands four times among five teams. The decade began and ended with Auckland holding the shield. Notably, Auckland began their record 61 shield defences in 1985.

== Fixtures ==
=== 1980 ===
11 June 1980

Auckland	37–3	Horowhenua

Auckland

25 June 1980

Auckland	29–3	King Country

Auckland

9 August 1980

Auckland	19–12	Poverty Bay

Auckland

23 August 1980

Auckland	25–3	Southland

Auckland

30 August 1980

Auckland	43–13	Otago

Auckland

7 September 1980

Auckland	3–7	Waikato

Auckland

14 September 1980

Waikato	16–7	Thames Valley

Hamilton

27 September 1980

Waikato	15–0	Taranaki

Hamilton

=== 1981 ===
1 August 1981

Waikato	24–12	Otago

Hamilton

16 August 1981

Waikato	13–3	Bay of Plenty

Hamilton

22 August 1981

Waikato	54–0	East Coast

Hamilton

5 September 1981

Waikato	14–7	Canterbury

Hamilton

19 September 1981

Waikato	20–20	Counties Manukau

Hamilton

24 September 1981

Waikato	22–9	King Country

Hamilton

30 September 1981

Waikato	4–22	Wellington

Hamilton

=== 1982 ===
17 June 1982

Wellington	31–6	Marlborough

Wellington

7 August 1982

Wellington	30–9	Wanganui

Wellington

21 August 1982

Wellington	13–12	Hawke's Bay

Wellington

4 September 1982

Wellington	19–6	Taranaki

Wellington

18 September 1982

Wellington	12–16	Canterbury

Wellington

25 September 1982

Canterbury	15–15	Counties Manukau

Christchurch

29 September 1982

Canterbury	51–6	Wairarapa Bush

Christchurch

=== 1983 ===
20 July 1983

Canterbury	88–0	North Otago

Christchurch

27 July 1983

Canterbury	28–10	Southland

Christchurch

3 August 1983

Canterbury	28–0	Mid Canterbury

Christchurch

10 August 1983

Canterbury	39–9	North Auckland

Christchurch

14 August 1983

Canterbury	50–12	South Canterbury

Christchurch

10 September 1983

Canterbury	32–3	Hawke's Bay

Christchurch

17 September 1983

Canterbury	20–16	Wellington

Christchurch

24 September 1983

Canterbury	31–9	Auckland

Christchurch

1 October 1983

Canterbury	28–15	Manawatu

Christchurch

=== 1984 ===
1 August 1984

Canterbury	34–10	Nelson Bays

Christchurch

8 August 1984

Canterbury	57–13	Buller

Christchurch

25 August 1984

Canterbury	68–3	West Coast

Christchurch

8 September 1984

Canterbury	24–6	Wairarapa Bush

Christchurch

15 September 1984

Canterbury	44–3	Otago

Christchurch

22 September 1984

Canterbury	16–10	Waikato

Christchurch

29 September 1984

Canterbury	27–19	Counties Manukau

Christchurch

6 October 1984

Canterbury	18–13	Bay of Plenty

Christchurch

=== 1985 ===
19 June 1985

Canterbury	33–0	King Country

Christchurch

25 June 1985

Canterbury	27–3	Taranaki

Christchurch

6 July 1985

Canterbury	53–0	Southland

Christchurch

31 July 1985

Canterbury	42–4	Marlborough

Christchurch

31 August 1985

Canterbury	17–7	Mid Canterbury

Christchurch

7 September 1985

Canterbury	29–3	North Auckland

Christchurch

14 September 1985

Canterbury	23–28	Auckland

Christchurch

28 September 1985

Auckland	39–0	Waikato

Auckland

5 October 1985

Auckland	12–9	Counties Manukau

Auckland

=== 1986 ===
9 July 1986

Auckland	97–0	Thames Valley

Auckland

16 July 1986

Auckland	18–6	North Harbour

Auckland

24 August 1986

Auckland	82–6	Horowhenua

Auckland

30 August 1986

Auckland	50–7	Wairarapa Bush

Auckland

13 September 1986

Auckland	42–7	Otago

Auckland

20 September 1986

Auckland	21–0	Manawatu

Auckland

27 September 1986

Auckland	28–15	Canterbury

Auckland

4 October 1986

Auckland	32–6	North Auckland

Auckland

=== 1987 ===
15 July 1987

Auckland	59–6	Wanganui

Auckland

22 August 1987

Auckland	56–18	Hawke's Bay

Auckland

26 August 1987

Auckland	72–0	East Coast

Auckland

5 September 1987

Auckland	43–3	Bay of Plenty

Auckland

12 September 1987

Auckland	49–6	Taranaki

Auckland

19 September 1987

Auckland	34–11	Waikato

Auckland

26 September 1987

Auckland	33–18	Wellington

Auckland

3 October 1987

Auckland	48–9	Counties Manukau

Auckland

=== 1988 ===
10 August 1988

Auckland	28–0	King Country

Te Kūiti

13 August 1987

Auckland	41–13	Taranaki

New Plymouth

20 August 1988

Auckland	43–15	North Auckland

Auckland

31 August 1988

Auckland	62–9	Hawke's Bay

Napier

10 September 1988

Auckland	39–12	North Harbour

Auckland

17 September 1988

Auckland	59–3	Manawatu

Auckland

24 September 1988

Auckland	27–17	Otago

Auckland

1 October 1988

Auckland	31–10	Canterbury

Auckland

=== 1989 ===
16 August 1989

Auckland	58–7	Thames Valley

Paeroa

19 August 1989

Auckland	44–15	Taranaki

Auckland

30 August 1989

Auckland	66–0	Mid Canterbury

Ashburton

9 September 1989

Auckland	84–3	Counties Manukau

Auckland

16 September 1989

Auckland	34–21	Bay of Plenty

Auckland

23 September 1989

Auckland	22–9	Waikato

Auckland

30 September 1989

Auckland	29–6	Wellington

Auckland
