= 1979 National Provincial Championship =

New Zealand rugby union tournament in 1979

The 1979 season was the fourth year of the National Provincial Championship (NPC), a provincial rugby union competition in New Zealand. Counties were the winners of Division 1.

== Division 1 ==
| Relegated to Division Two |

| Pos | Team | Pld | W | D | L | PF | PA | PD | Pts |
|---|---|---|---|---|---|---|---|---|---|
| 1 | Counties | 10 | 9 | 0 | 1 | 158 | 84 | +74 | 18 |
| 2 | Auckland | 10 | 8 | 0 | 2 | 175 | 88 | +87 | 16 |
| 3 | Wellington | 10 | 8 | 0 | 2 | 176 | 116 | +60 | 16 |
| 4 | Canterbury | 10 | 7 | 0 | 3 | 146 | 115 | +31 | 14 |
| 5 | North Auckland | 10 | 6 | 0 | 4 | 116 | 99 | +17 | 12 |
| 6 | Bay of Plenty | 10 | 5 | 1 | 4 | 158 | 148 | +10 | 11 |
| 7 | Manawatu | 10 | 4 | 1 | 5 | 121 | 106 | +15 | 9 |
| 8 | Taranaki | 10 | 3 | 0 | 7 | 120 | 140 | −20 | 6 |
| 9 | Southland | 10 | 2 | 0 | 8 | 106 | 169 | −63 | 4 |
| 10 | South Canterbury | 10 | 1 | 0 | 9 | 81 | 212 | −131 | 2 |
| 11 | Otago | 10 | 1 | 0 | 9 | 88 | 168 | −80 | 2 |

== Promotion/relegation ==
As the bottom-placed North Island team, Taranaki were automatically relegated.

Division Two North winner Hawkes Bay were promoted to Division One.

Otago faced Division Two South winner Marlborough, defeating them 15–13 to remain in Division One.

=== Division Two ===
Division 2 North (in order of final placing)

- Hawke's Bay
- Waikato
- Poverty Bay
- Wanganui
- Horowhenua
- Thames Valley
- King Country
- Wairarapa Bush
- East Coast

Division 2 South (in order of final placing)

- Marlborough
- Mid Canterbury
- Buller
- Nelson Bays
- North Otago
- West Coast

== Ranfurly Shield ==
North Auckland began the season as holders having defeated Manawatu the season before. They defended the Shield in five matches before being defeated by Auckland. Auckland then successfully defended against Counties in the final match of the season that pitted the shield holders against the national champions.

North Auckland

- beat King Country 21–6
- beat Thames Valley 35–6
- beat Marlborough 29–6
- beat South Canterbury 20–12
- beat Taranaki 23–11
- lost to Auckland 3–9

Auckland

- beat Counties 11–9
