= 1986 National Provincial Championship =

New Zealand rugby union tournament in 1986

The 1986 season was the eleventh year of the National Provincial Championship (NPC), a provincial rugby union competition in New Zealand. Wellington were the winners of Division 1.

== Division 1 ==
The following table gives the final standings:

Relegated to Division Two

Pos	Team	Pld	W	D	L	PF	PA	PD	Pts
1	Wellington	10	10	0	0	274	131	+143	40
2	Auckland	10	9	0	1	308	85	+223	36
3	Canterbury	10	7	1	2	282	153	+129	31
4	Otago	10	6	0	4	199	187	+12	25
5	Bay of Plenty	10	5	0	5	179	214	-35	22
6	Counties	10	4	0	6	147	234	-87	16
7	Taranaki	10	3	0	7	189	205	-16	15
8	North Auckland	10	3	0	7	147	176	-29	13
9	Wairarapa Bush	10	3	0	7	123	241	-118	13
10	Manawatu	10	2	1	7	176	225	-49	12
11	Southland	10	2	0	8	166	339	-173	8

== Division 2 ==
The following table gives the final standings:

Relegated to Division Three

Pos	Team	Pld	W	D	L	PF	PA	PD	Pts
1	Waikato	7	7	0	0	218	59	+159	28
2	North Harbour	7	6	0	1	172	58	-114	25
3	Wanganui	7	5	0	2	153	80	+73	21
4	Hawke's Bay	7	4	0	3	200	111	+89	17
5	Mid Canterbury	7	4	0	3	76	138	-62	13
6	Marlborough	7	2	0	5	93	181	-88	8
7	King Country	7	1	0	6	571	173	-398	5
8	Buller	7	0	0	7	502	219	-283	1

== Division 3 ==
The following table gives the final standings:

Pos	Team	Pld	W	D	L	PF	PA	PD	Pts
1	South Canterbury	7	7	0	0	161	68	+93	28
2	East Coast	7	5	0	2	92	74	+18	21
3	Horowhenua	7	4	0	3	139	94	+45	18
4	Thames Valley	7	3	0	4	88	95	-7	15
5	Poverty Bay	7	3	0	4	118	116	+2	14
6	West Coast	7	3	0	4	78	122	-44	14
7	Nelson Bays	7	2	0	5	70	121	-51	10
8	North Otago	7	1	0	6	82	136	-54	6

== Promotion/relegation ==
Division Two winner Waikato won their playoff match with North Harbour to be promoted to Division One to replace Southland who were relegated. Division Three winner South Canterbury were elevated to Division Two to replace Buller who were relegated.
