= 1988 National Provincial Championship =

New Zealand rugby union tournament in 1988

The 1988 season was the thirteenth year of the National Provincial Championship (NPC), a provincial rugby union competition in New Zealand. Auckland were the winners of Division 1.

== Division 1 ==
The following table gives the final standings:

Relegated to Division Two

Pos	Team	Pld	W	D	L	PF	PA	PD	Pts
1	Auckland	10	10	0	0	321	114	+207	40
2	Wellington	10	8	0	2	304	161	+143	34
3	Otago	10	8	0	2	316	154	+162	32
4	North Harbour	10	5	1	4	227	187	+40	24
5	North Auckland	10	5	0	5	237	202	-35	22
6	Canterbury	10	5	0	5	180	197	-17	22
7	Counties	10	4	1	5	160	208	-48	19
8	Waikato	10	4	0	6	193	229	-36	18
9	Taranaki	10	3	0	7	173	268	-95	14
10	Bay of Plenty	10	1	0	9	182	282	-100	6
11	Manawatu	10	1	0	9	84	337	-253	14

== Division 2 ==
The following table gives the final standings:

Relegated to Division Three

Pos	Team	Pld	W	D	L	PF	PA	PD	Pts
1	Hawke's Bay	7	7	0	0	225	113	+112	28
2	Marlborough	7	6	0	1	161	113	+48	24
3	Wairarapa Bush	7	5	0	2	197	136	+61	21
4	Southland	7	3	0	4	141	132	+9	13
5	Poverty Bay	7	3	0	4	109	135	-26	12
6	King Country	7	2	0	5	99	128	-29	10
7	Mid Canterbury	7	1	0	6	80	154	-74	7
8	South Canterbury	7	1	0	6	92	193	-101	5

== Division 3 ==
The following table gives the final standings:

Pos	Team	Pld	W	D	L	PF	PA	PD	Pts
1	Thames Valley	7	7	0	0	284	42	+242	28
2	Wanganui	7	6	0	1	307	74	+233	24
3	Nelson Bays	7	5	0	2	151	104	+47	20
4	Horowhenua	7	3	0	4	127	171	-44	17
5	Buller	7	3	0	4	101	180	-79	12
6	East Coast	7	2	0	5	115	191	-76	9
7	North Otago	7	1	0	6	83	198	-115	5
8	West Coast	7	1	0	6	42	250	-208	5

== Promotion/relegation ==
Division Two winner Hawke's Bay were promoted to Division One to replace Manawatu who were relegated. Division Three winner Thames Valley were elevated to Division Two to replace South Canterbury who were relegated.
