= 1983 National Provincial Championship =

New Zealand rugby union tournament in 1983

The 1983 season was the eighth year of the National Provincial Championship (NPC), a provincial rugby union competition in New Zealand. Canterbury were the winners of Division 1.

== Division 1 ==
The following table gives the final standings:

Pos	Team	Pld	W	D	L	PF	PA	PD	Pts
1	Canterbury	10	10	0	0	295	109	+186	20
2	Wellington	10	7	1	2	209	104	+105	15
3	Auckland	10	6	1	3	164	104	+60	13
4	Bay of Plenty	10	5	0	5	207	190	+17	10
5	Counties	10	5	2	3	182	147	+35	12
6	Waikato	10	5	0	5	161	205	-44	10
7	Otago	10	4	2	2	121	170	-49	10
8	Manawatu	10	4	0	6	188	162	+26	8
9	North Auckland	10	3	0	7	134	160	-26	6
10	Wairarapa Bush	10	2	1	7	96	206	-110	5
11	Hawke's Bay	10	1	1	8	92	205	-113	3

== Division 2 (North Island) ==
The following table gives the final standings:

Pos	Team	Pld	W	D	L	PF	PA	PD	Pts
1	Taranaki	6	6	0	0	321	37	+284	12
2	Wanganui	6	5	0	1	186	56	+130	10
3	Poverty Bay	6	4	0	2	94	73	+21	8
4	King Country	6	3	0	3	102	94	+8	6
5	Thames Valley	6	2	0	4	96	121	-25	4
6	Horowhenua	6	1	0	5	69	235	-166	2
7	East Coast	6	0	0	6	25	266	-241	0

== Division 2 (South Island) ==
The following table gives the final standings:

Pos	Team	Pld	W	D	L	PF	PA	PD	Pts
1	Mid Canterbury	7	6	0	1	154	78	-76	12
2	Southland	7	6	0	1	157	61	+96	12
3	Marlborough	7	5	0	2	127	59	+68	10
4	South Canterbury	7	4	0	3	93	97	-4	8
5	Buller	7	3	0	4	70	95	-25	6
6	Nelson Bays	7	3	0	4	96	121	-25	6
7	West Coast	7	1	0	5	71	121	-50	2
8	North Otago	7	0	0	7	32	168	-136	0

== Promotion/relegation ==
Division Two South winner Mid Canterbury defeated Division Two North winner Taranaki 6 points to 3 in the playoff match. Mid-Canterbury then challenged Hawke's Bay, but were defeated 32 points to 15 for Hawke's Bay remained in Division One for the 1984 season.
