= 1989 National Provincial Championship =

New Zealand rugby union tournament in 1989

The 1989 season was the fourteenth year of the National Provincial Championship (NPC), a provincial rugby union competition in New Zealand. Auckland were the winners of Division 1.

== Division 1 ==
The following table gives the final standings:

Relegated to Division Two

Pos	Team	Pld	W	D	L	PF	PA	PD	Pts
1	Auckland	10	9	1	0	348	87	+261	38
2	Canterbury	10	8	1	1	287	168	+119	34
3	North Harbour	10	7	1	2	272	164	+108	31
4	Waikato	10	7	0	3	335	124	+211	29
5	Otago	10	4	1	5	243	161	+82	21
6	Bay of Plenty	10	4	1	5	198	231	-33	18
7	Wellington	10	4	0	6	169	245	-76	17
8	North Auckland	10	3	1	6	195	255	-60	15
9	Counties	10	3	0	7	139	319	-180	13
10	Taranaki	10	2	0	8	156	372	-216	9
11	Hawke's Bay	10	1	0	9	140	345	-205	4

== Division 2 ==
The following table gives the final standings:

Relegated to Division Three

Pos	Team	Pld	W	D	L	PF	PA	PD	Pts
1	Southland	7	6	0	1	195	80	+115	25
2	Manawatu	7	6	0	1	220	65	+155	25
3	King Country	7	5	0	2	137	108	+29	22
4	Marlborough	7	4	0	3	109	144	-35	17
5	Wairarapa Bush	7	3	0	4	99	132	-33	12
6	Poverty Bay	7	2	0	5	87	151	-64	9
7	Mid Canterbury	7	1	1	5	92	199	-107	7
8	Thames Valley	7	0	1	6	63	123	-60	4

== Division 3 ==
The following table gives the final standings:

Pos	Team	Pld	W	D	L	PF	PA	PD	Pts
1	Wanganui	7	7	0	0	273	73	+200	28
2	South Canterbury	7	5	0	2	276	76	+200	22
3	Horowhenua	7	5	0	2	159	103	+56	21
4	Nelson Bays	7	4	0	3	100	136	-36	17
5	Buller	7	4	0	3	90	145	-55	17
6	East Coast	7	2	0	5	68	203	-135	8
7	North Otago	7	1	0	6	64	158	-94	7
8	West Coast	7	0	0	7	64	200	-136	2

== Promotion/relegation ==
Division Two winner Southland were promoted to Division One to replace Hawke's Bay who were relegated. Division Three winner Wanganui were elevated to Division Two to replace Thames Valley who were relegated.
