= 1978 National Provincial Championship =

The 1978 season was the third year of the National Provincial Championship (NPC), a provincial rugby union competition in New Zealand. Wellington were the winners of Division 1.

== Division 1 ==
Relegated to Division Two

Pos	Team	Pld	W	D	L	PF	PA	PD	Pts
1	Wellington	10	8	0	2	172	111	+61	16
2	Counties	10	7	0	3	167	110	+57	14
3	Canterbury	10	6	0	4	152	144	+8	12
4	Auckland	10	6	0	4	123	100	+23	12
5	North Auckland	10	6	0	4	129	137	−8	12
6	Manawatu	10	5	1	4	141	122	+19	11
7	Taranaki	10	4	2	4	156	129	+27	10
8	Southland	10	5	0	5	114	101	+13	10
9	Otago	10	3	1	6	115	164	−49	7
10	South Canterbury	10	2	1	7	92	150	−58	5
11	Hawke's Bay	10	0	1	9	68	161	−93	1

=== Results ===
June

5 June 1978

Counties	15–19	Wellington

Pukekohe Stadium, Pukekohe

14 June 1978

Hawke's Bay	4–9	Auckland

McLean Park, Napier

14 June 1978

Taranaki	17–17	Manawatu

Rugby Park, New Plymouth

21 June 1978

Counties	21–4	Manawatu

Pukekohe Stadium, Pukekohe

24 June 1978

Auckland	6–24	Manawatu

Eden Park, Auckland

July

1 July 1978

South Canterbury	7–26	Manawatu

Fraser Park, Timaru

5 July 1978

Otago	14–16	Manawatu

Carisbrook, Dunedin

8 July 1978

Southland	14–6	South Canterbury

Rugby Park, Invercargill

15 July 1978

North Auckland	7–26	Counties

Okara Park, Whangārei

15 July 1978

South Canterbury	0–6	Southland

Fraser Park, Timaru

29 July 1978

Canterbury	23–0	Hawke's Bay

Lancaster Park, Christchurch

29 July 1978

Southland	6–7	Otago

Rugby Park, Invercargill

August

5 August 1978

North Auckland	12–3	Hawke's Bay

Okara Park, Whangārei

5 August 1978

Canterbury	18–7	South Canterbury

Lancaster Park, Christchurch

12 August 1978

South Canterbury	10–0	Taranaki

Fraser Park, Timaru

12 August 1978

Otago	9–14	Wellington

Carisbrook, Dunedin

16 August 1978

Otago	20–10	Hawke's Bay

Carisbrook, Dunedin

16 August 1978

Southland	16–7	Wellington

Rugby Park, Invercargill

19 August 1978

Taranaki	15–26	North Auckland

Rugby Park, New Plymouth

20 August 1978

Southland	15–7	Hawke's Bay

Rugby Park, Invercargill

23 August 1978

South Canterbury	6–10	North Auckland

Fraser Park, Timaru

26 August 1978

Wellington	22–10	North Auckland

Athletic Park, Wellington

27 August 1978

Taranaki	10–13	Auckland

Rugby Park, New Plymouth

30 August 1978

North Auckland	13–24	Canterbury

Okara Park, Whangārei

30 August 1978

South Canterbury	3–21	Auckland

Fraser Park, Timaru

30 August 1978

Southland	13–10	Counties

Rugby Park, Invercargill

September

2 September 1978

Auckland	13–7	Canterbury

Eden Park, Auckland

2 September 1978

Hawke's Bay	17–17	Taranaki

McLean Park, Napier

2 September 1978

Manawatu	13–6	Wellington

Showgrounds Oval, Palmerston North

2 September 1978

Otago	9–19	Counties

Carisbrook, Dunedin

5 September 1978

Canterbury	6–21	Counties

Lancaster Park, Christchurch

6 September 1978

Wellington	26–10	South Canterbury

Athletic Park, Wellington

10 September 1978

Hawke's Bay	7–25	South Canterbury

McLean Park, Napier

10 September 1978

Taranaki	15–9	Southland

Rugby Park, New Plymouth

10 September 1978

Wellington	12–6	Auckland

Athletic Park, Wellington

10 September 1978

Canterbury	21–15	Otago

Lancaster Park, Christchurch

12 September 1978

Manawatu	10–12	North Auckland

Showgrounds Oval, Palmerston North

13 September 1978

Auckland	15–12	Southland

Eden Park, Auckland

13 September 1978

Counties	24–12	South Canterbury

Pukekohe Stadium, Pukekohe

13 September 1978

Taranaki	25–3	Otago

Rugby Park, New Plymouth

16 September 1978

Auckland	21–10	Otago

Eden Park, Auckland

16 September 1978

Manawatu	21–10	Hawke's Bay

Showgrounds Oval, Palmerston North

16 September 1978

Wellington	29–7	Canterbury

Athletic Park, Wellington

20 September 1978

North Auckland	26–10	Otago

Okara Park, Whangārei

20 September 1978

Counties	12–10	Auckland

Pukekohe Stadium, Pukekohe

23 September 1978

Hawke's Bay	7–8	Counties

McLean Park, Napier

24 September 1978

Wellington	19–15	Taranaki

Athletic Park, Wellington

24 September 1978

Canterbury	21–16	Southland

Lancaster Park, Christchurch

27 September 1978

Taranaki	26–10	Canterbury

Rugby Park, New Plymouth

27 September 1978

Otago	12–12	South Canterbury

Carisbrook, Dunedin

30 September 1978

Auckland	15–10	North Auckland

Eden Park, Auckland

30 September 1978

Counties	11–23	Taranaki

Pukekohe Stadium, Pukekohe

30 September 1978

Hawke's Bay	10–18	Wellington

McLean Park, Napier

30 September 1978

Manawatu	4–15	Canterbury

Showgrounds Oval, Palmerston North

== Division 2 (North Island) ==
Pos	Team	Pld	W	D	L	PF	PA	PD	Pts
1	Bay of Plenty	8	7	1	0	160	84	+76	14
2	Waikato	8	7	1	0	205	77	+128	14
3	Wanganui	8	6	2	0	117	71	+46	12
4	Poverty Bay	8	4	4	0	128	127	+1	8
5	Horowhenua	8	4	4	0	101	128	-27	8
6	Thames Valley	8	3	4	1	88	167	-79	7
7	Wairarapa Bush	8	2	6	0	108	105	+3	4
8	King Country	8	2	6	0	106	152	-46	4
9	East Coast	8	0	7	1	85	187	-102	1

== Division 2 (South Island) ==
Pos	Team	Pld	W	D	L	PF	PA	PD	Pts
1	Marlborough	5	5	0	0	124	33	+91	10
2	Nelson Bays	5	4	1	0	76	54	+22	8
3	Mid Canterbury	5	3	2	0	49	41	+8	6
4	North Otago	5	2	3	0	55	94	-39	4
5	Buller	5	1	4	0	53	81	-28	2
6	West Coast	5	0	5	0	27	81	-54	0

== Promotion/Relegation ==
As the bottom-placed North Island team, Hawkes Bay were automatically relegated. The winners of Division Two North, Bay of Plenty, were automatically promoted to Division One.

South Canterbury faced Division Two South winner Marlborough. The match was tied 10–10, which meant South Canterbury remained in Division One.

4 October 1978

South Canterbury	10–10	Marlborough
Try: Neville Richards; Con: Tony Kelly (0/1); Pen: Tony Kelly (2/2)		Try: lan McAlpine; Con: Steve Marfell (0/1); Pen: Steve Marfell (2/3)

Fraser Park, Timaru

== Ranfurly Shield ==
Manawatu began the season as holders having defeated Auckland in the 1976 season. In 1978, they defended the shield in four matches, extending their tenure to 13 successful defences before being defeated by North Auckland. North Auckland chose not to accept any more challenges in 1978 and thus held the shield for the summer.

Manawatu

- beat West Coast 51–10
- beat Horowhenua 42–14
- beat Poverty Bay 24–0
- beat Wellington 13–6
- lost to North Auckland 10–12
