= 1981 National Provincial Championship =

New Zealand rugby union tournament in 1981

The 1981 season was the sixth year of the National Provincial Championship (NPC), a provincial rugby union competition in New Zealand. Wellington were the winners of Division 1.

== Division 1 ==
The following table gives the final standings:

Relegated to Division Two

Pos	Team	Pld	W	D	L	PF	PA	PD	Pts
1	Wellington	10	9	0	1	255	94	+161	18
2	Manawatu	10	7	0	3	269	157	+112	14
3	Counties	10	6	1	3	197	129	+68	13
4	Auckland	10	6	0	4	55	135	-80	12
5	Waikato	10	5	1	4	142	160	-18	11
6	Bay of Plenty	10	5	0	5	183	172	+11	10
7	North Auckland	10	5	0	5	115	144	-29	10
8	Otago	10	5	0	5	148	195	-47	10
9	Canterbury	10	4	0	6	128	165	-37	8
10	Hawke's Bay	10	1	0	9	158	279	-121	2
11	Southland	10	1	0	9	115	235	-120	2

== Division 2 (North Island) ==
The following table gives the final standings:

Pos	Team	Pld	W	D	L	PF	PA	PD	Pts
1	Wairarapa Bush	7	7	0	0	141	29	+112	14
2	Taranaki	7	6	0	1	295	52	+243	12
3	Wanganui	7	5	0	2	208	70	+130	10
4	Poverty Bay	7	3	0	4	170	140	+30	6
5	Horowhenua	7	3	0	4	96	209	-113	6
6	King Country	7	2	0	5	105	119	-14	4
7	Thames Valley	7	2	0	5	81	182	-101	4
8	East Coast	7	0	0	6	40	168	-128	0

== Division 2 (South Island) ==
The following table gives the final standings:

Pos	Team	Pld	W	D	L	PF	PA	PD	Pts
1	South Canterbury	6	5	1	0	143	66	+77	11
2	Marlborough	6	5	0	1	150	67	+83	10
3	Mid Canterbury	6	4	0	2	115	47	+68	8
4	Nelson Bays	6	2	1	3	64	66	-2	5
5	West Coast	6	2	0	4	62	124	-62	4
6	Buller	6	2	0	4	49	85	-36	4
7	North Otago	6	0	0	6	40	168	-128	0

== Promotion/relegation ==
Division Two North winner Wairarapa Bush defeated Southland 10 points to 9 and were promoted to Division One for the 1982 season.
