= 1985 National Provincial Championship =

New Zealand rugby union tournament in 1985

The 1985 season was the tenth year of the National Provincial Championship (NPC), a provincial rugby union competition in New Zealand. Auckland were the winners of Division 1.

== Division 1 ==
The following table gives the final standings:

| Relegated to Division Two |

| Pos | Team | Pld | W | D | L | PF | PA | PD | Pts |
|---|---|---|---|---|---|---|---|---|---|
| 1 | Auckland | 10 | 9 | 0 | 1 | 232 | 86 | +146 | 18 |
| 2 | Canterbury | 10 | 7 | 1 | 2 | 240 | 109 | +131 | 15 |
| 3 | Wellington | 10 | 7 | 1 | 2 | 281 | 163 | +118 | 15 |
| 4 | Wairarapa Bush | 10 | 6 | 0 | 4 | 132 | 162 | -30 | 12 |
| 5 | Otago | 10 | 5 | 1 | 4 | 178 | 128 | +50 | 11 |
| 6 | Bay of Plenty | 10 | 5 | 0 | 5 | 176 | 207 | -31 | 10 |
| 7 | Counties | 10 | 3 | 1 | 6 | 147 | 180 | -33 | 7 |
| 8 | Manawatu | 10 | 3 | 1 | 6 | 176 | 197 | -21 | 7 |
| 9 | North Auckland | 10 | 3 | 1 | 6 | 136 | 172 | -36 | 7 |
| 10 | Southland | 10 | 2 | 0 | 8 | 80 | 296 | -216 | 4 |
| 11 | Waikato | 10 | 2 | 0 | 8 | 126 | 194 | -68 | 4 |

== Division 2 ==
The following table gives the final standings:

| Relegated to Division Three |

| Pos | Team | Pld | W | D | L | PF | PA | PD | Pts |
|---|---|---|---|---|---|---|---|---|---|
| 1 | Taranaki | 7 | 7 | 0 | 0 | 233 | 44 | +189 | 14 |
| 2 | Hawke's Bay | 7 | 5 | 0 | 2 | 193 | 85 | +108 | 10 |
| 3 | Marlborough | 7 | 5 | 0 | 2 | 133 | 102 | +31 | 10 |
| 4 | King Country | 7 | 4 | 0 | 3 | 129 | 102 | +27 | 10 |
| 5 | Mid Canterbury | 7 | 3 | 0 | 4 | 113 | 137 | -24 | 6 |
| 6 | Wanganui | 7 | 3 | 0 | 4 | 86 | 121 | -35 | 6 |
| 7 | Buller | 7 | 1 | 0 | 6 | 75 | 175 | 100 | 2 |
| 8 | West Coast | 7 | 0 | 0 | 7 | 51 | 247 | -196 | 0 |

== Division 3 (North) ==
The following table gives the final standings:

| Pos | Team | Pld | W | D | L | PF | PA | PD | Pts |
|---|---|---|---|---|---|---|---|---|---|
| 1 | North Harbour | 3 | 3 | 0 | 0 | 111 | 7 | +104 | 3 |
| 2 | Poverty Bay | 3 | 2 | 0 | 1 | 43 | 42 | -1 | 4 |
| 3 | Thames Valley | 3 | 1 | 0 | 2 | 53 | 71 | -18 | 2 |
| 4 | East Coast | 3 | 0 | 0 | 3 | 23 | 86 | -63 | 0 |

== Division 3 (South) ==
The following table gives the final standings:

| Pos | Team | Pld | W | D | L | PF | PA | PD | Pts |
|---|---|---|---|---|---|---|---|---|---|
| 1 | Nelson Bays | 3 | 3 | 0 | 0 | 54 | 30 | +24 | 6 |
| 2 | South Canterbury | 3 | 2 | 0 | 1 | 56 | 30 | +26 | 4 |
| 3 | Horowhenua | 3 | 1 | 0 | 2 | 45 | 32 | +13 | 2 |
| 4 | North Otago | 3 | 0 | 0 | 3 | 23 | 86 | -63 | 0 |

== Promotion/relegation ==
Division Two winner Taranaki won their playoff match with Hawke's Bay to be promoted to Division One to replace Waikato who were relegated. Division Three North winner North Harbour to replace West Coast who were relegated.
