= 2004 National Provincial Championship =

The 2004 season was the 29th year of the National Provincial Championship (NPC), a provincial rugby union competition in New Zealand. Canterbury were the winners of Division 1, Nelson Bays were the winners of Division 2, and Poverty Bay were the winners of Division 3.

== Division 1 ==
=== Standings ===
Pos	Team	Pld	W	D	L	PF	PA	PD	TF	TA	TB	LB	Pts
1	Wellington	9	7	1	1	313	154	+159	38	17	4	1	35
2	Canterbury	9	6	1	2	346	207	+139	40	25	4	2	32
3	Bay of Plenty	9	7	0	2	241	221	+20	25	25	3	1	32
4	Waikato	9	6	0	3	294	215	+79	37	22	5	1	30
5	Taranaki	9	6	0	3	332	257	+75	43	31	4	1	29
6	North Harbour	9	4	1	4	246	200	+46	28	23	5	4	27
7	Auckland	9	4	0	5	265	287	−22	34	34	5	3	24
8	Otago	9	2	1	6	183	261	−78	17	31	1	1	12
9	Southland	9	1	0	8	174	338	−164	21	40	1	0	5
10	Northland	9	0	0	9	182	436	−254	21	56	0	1	1

=== Results ===
==== Week 1 ====
13 August 2004

Wellington	34–27	Canterbury

14 August 2004

Otago	40–24	Northland

14 August 2004

Taranaki	33–29	North Harbour

14 August 2004

Waikato	52–23	Southland

15 August 2004

Auckland (RS)	28–33	Bay of Plenty

==== Week 2 ====
20 August 2004

Southland	16–48	Taranaki

21 August 2004

Canterbury	43–43	North Harbour

21 August 2004

Northland	29–37	Auckland

21 August 2004

Otago	16–16	Wellington

22 August 2004

Bay of Plenty (RS)	26–20	Waikato

==== Week 3 ====
27 August 2004

Canterbury	42–7	Otago

28 August 2004

Waikato	59–11	Auckland

28 August 2004

Southland	54–26	Northland

28 August 2004

Taranaki	58–14	Bay of Plenty

29 August 2004

North Harbour	16–18	Wellington

==== Week 4 ====
3 September 2004

Wellington	37–17	Waikato

4 September 2004

Auckland	32–34	North Harbour

4 September 2004

Otago	27–10	Southland

4 September 2004

Northland	11–62	Taranaki

5 September 2004

Bay of Plenty (RS)	26–33	Canterbury

==== Week 5 ====
10 September 2004

North Harbour	35–16	Southland

11 September 2004

Bay of Plenty	44–16	Otago

11 September 2004

Waikato	41–21	Northland

11 September 2004

Wellington	27–21	Auckland

12 September 2004

Taranaki	30–23	Canterbury

==== Week 6 ====
17 September 2004

Otago	27–39	Waikato

18 September 2004

Bay of Plenty	17–13	Wellington

18 September 2004

Auckland	51–22	Taranaki

18 September 2004

Canterbury (RS)	52–13	Southland

19 September 2004

Northland	16–40	North Harbour

==== Week 7 ====
24 September 2004

Waikato	15–30	Canterbury

25 September 2004

Northland	24–29	Bay of Plenty

25 September 2004

Wellington	73–28	Taranaki

25 September 2004

North Harbour	20–3	Otago

26 September 2004

Southland	22–30	Auckland

==== Week 8 ====
1 October 2004

Taranaki	31–14	Otago

2 October 2004

Wellington	65–12	Northland

2 October 2004

Bay of Plenty	38–20	Southland

2 October 2004

Auckland	20–28	Canterbury

3 October 2004

Waikato	25–20	North Harbour

==== Week 9 ====
8 October 2004

Auckland	35–33	Otago

9 October 2004

Taranaki	20–26	Waikato

9 October 2004

Canterbury (RS)	68–19	Northland

9 October 2004

Southland	0–30	Wellington

10 October 2004

North Harbour	9–14	Bay of Plenty

==== Semi-finals ====
15 October 2004

Wellington	28–16	Waikato

16 October 2004

Canterbury	44–12	Bay of Plenty

==== Grand Final ====
23 October 2004

Wellington	27–40	Canterbury

== Division 2 ==
Pos	Team	Pld	W	D	L	PF	PA	PD	TF	TA	TB	LB	Pts
1	Nelson Bays	8	7	1	0	270	145	+125	37	15	6	0	36
2	Hawke's Bay	8	7	0	1	383	127	+256	56	12	6	1	35
3	Counties Manukau	8	6	1	1	301	215	+86	39	28	5	0	31
4	North Otago	8	5	0	3	335	245	+90	45	33	5	1	26
5	Marlborough	8	3	0	5	206	233	−27	22	32	2	1	15
6	Manawatu	8	3	0	5	187	219	−32	24	32	2	0	14
7	Wanganui	8	3	0	5	193	227	−34	27	29	4	1	12*
8	East Coast	8	1	0	7	183	209	−26	24	26	1	3	7*
9	Thames Valley	8	0	0	8	72	510	−438	9	72	0	0	0

- = Wanganui lost five points and East Coast lost one bonus point for player eligibility breaches, i.e. the points gained in the match where the breach took place.

Semi-finals

- Nelson Bays 32-15 North Otago
- Hawke's Bay 41-20 Counties Manukau

Grand final

- Nelson Bays 19-14 Hawke's Bay

== Division 3 ==
Pos	Team	Pld	W	D	L	PF	PA	PD	TF	TA	TB	LB	Pts
1	Poverty Bay	7	5	0	2	227	119	+108	30	14	5	2	27
2	Wairarapa Bush	7	5	1	1	176	120	+56	24	14	4	0	26
3	Mid Canterbury	7	5	0	2	185	126	+59	22	18	2	1	23
4	Horowhenua-Kapiti	7	4	1	2	209	171	+38	31	23	4	0	22
5	King Country	7	3	1	3	161	144	+17	20	18	1	1	16
6	South Canterbury	7	2	1	4	119	150	−31	15	19	1	1	12
7	West Coast	7	2	0	5	130	267	−137	18	37	2	0	10
8	Buller	7	0	0	7	92	202	−110	10	27	0	3	3

Semi-finals

- Poverty Bay 22-13 Horowhenua-Kapiti
- Wairarapa Bush 16-9 Mid Canterbury

Grand final

- Poverty Bay 37-14 Wairarapa Bush

== Ranfurly Shield ==
As the holders of the Ranfurly Shield from the end of 2003, Auckland began their defence of the shield against Poverty Bay in Auckland. Auckland won this match and made one more successful defence before losing to Bay of Plenty. Following their first ever Ranfurly Shield win, Bay of Plenty also won their first ever defence of the shield against Waikato before losing it to Canterbury, who made two successful defences to take the shield into the 2005 season.

Auckland (15th Ranfurly Shield reign)

- 28 July 2004 – Auckland v Poverty Bay (won 116–3)
- 1 August 2004 – Auckland v Counties Manukau (won 100–15)
- 15 August 2004 – Auckland v Bay of Plenty (lost 28–33)

Bay of Plenty (1st Ranfurly Shield reign)

- 22 August 2004 – Bay of Plenty v Waikato (won 26–20)
- 5 September 2004 – Bay of Plenty v Canterbury (lost 26–33)

Canterbury (11th Ranfurly Shield reign)

- 18 September 2004 – Canterbury v Southland (won 52–13)
- 9 October 2004 – Canterbury v Northland (won 68–19)
