= 1989 Fiji rugby union tour of Oceania =

Summary
P	W	D	L
Total
11	5	0	6
Test match
2	0	0	2
Opponent
P	W	D	L
Western Samoa
1	0	0	1
Tonga
1	0	0	1

The 1989 Fiji rugby union tour of Oceania was a series of matches played in Australia, New Zealand, Samoa and Tonga, between April and June 1989 in by Fiji national rugby union team.

In reality there were three different tours. In April in Australia, then in New Zealand (no test match) and in June–July in Samoa and Tonga.

== Results ==
=== Australia ===
9 April 1989

New South Wales	32 - 7	Fiji XV
	report

Concord Oval, Sydney
Referee: Col Waldron ( (Queensland) - QRU)

12 April 1989

Canberra Kookaburras	34-9	Fiji XV
	report

Seiffert Oval, Canberra
Referee: SK Lees (Australian Capital Territory) (ACT RU)

16 April 1989

Queensland	39 - 13	Fiji XV
	report

Ballymore, Brisbane
Referee: B.Kinsey (Australia)

=== Against Wellington at Suva ===
22 April 1989

Fiji XV	18-9	Wellington
	report

Suva
Referee: L Lolati (Fiji) -(Suva)

=== In New Zealand ===
29 April 1989

Canterbury	19 - 23	Fiji XV
	report

Lancaster Park, Christchurch
Referee: Glen Wahlstrom (Auckland RU)

3 May 1989

Marlborough	26 - 45	Fiji XV
	report

Lansdowne Park, Blenheim
Referee: M Barry (Marlborough RU)

7 May 1989

Auckland	72 - 9	Fiji XV
	report

Eden park, Auckland
Referee: GJ Anderson Canterbury RU

=== In Samoa ===
3 June 1989

Samoa Pres. XV	15 - 28	Fiji XV

Apia

8 June 1989

Samoa Country Sel.	18 - 27	Fiji XV

Apia

10 June 1989

Western Samoa	32 - 13	Fiji
	report

Apia

=== Against Tonga in Suva ===
15 July 1989

Fiji	18-12	Tonga
	report

Suva
Referee: Laiakini Colati

=== Against Tonga in Nukuʻalofa ===
22 July 1989

Tonga	9 - 7	Fiji
	report

Nukuʻalofa
Referee: Jo Fonua
