= Tyrone Maullin =

- Born: 8 October 1968 (age 58) Durban, South Africa
- Height: 198 cm (6 ft 6 in)
- Weight: 118 kg (260 lb)

Rugby union career
- Position: Lock
Senior career
| Years | Team | Apps | (Points) |
| ?–1997 | Natal Sharks | | |
| 1997–2002 | Swansea | 134 | (95) |
| 2002–? | Fraser Tech, Hamilton | | |
Provincial / State sides
| Years | Team | Apps | (Points) |
| 2003 | Thames Valley | 9 | |
International career
| Years | Team | Apps | (Points) |
| 2000–2001 | Wales A | 5 | |

Tyrone Maullin (born 8 October 1968) is a former professional rugby union player who played as a lock for Natal Sharks, Swansea and Thames Valley. Born in Durban, South Africa, he moved from Natal to Swansea in 1997, where he was coached by former Sharks teammate John Plumtree. He spent five seasons in South Wales, scoring 19 tries in 134 appearances. In 2000, after playing in a national trial match on 29 January, he was named in the Wales A squad for that season's Six Nations A Championship. He made his debut against France A on the opening weekend, as well as against Italy A and England A in the following two games; he was named in the starting line-up for the fourth game against Scotland A, but investigations surrounding the Grannygate scandal led to the revelation that he had spent the first six months of his time in the UK living in London, and had therefore not spent the requisite 36 months in Wales to make him eligible by residency, leading to him being dropped. He returned to the Wales A squad for the 2001 Six Nations A Championship, playing in the final two matches against France A and Italy A. At the end of the 2001–02 season, he moved to New Zealand, where he played for Fraser Tech in Hamilton, before making nine appearances for the Thames Valley provincial side in the 2003 National Provincial Championship. He made an impactful performance on his debut for Thames Valley in a 35–7 win against Mid Canterbury, but did not do enough to earn selection for the 2004 season.
