= 1987 National Provincial Championship =

New Zealand rugby union tournament in 1987

The 1987 season was the twelfth year of the National Provincial Championship (NPC), a provincial rugby union competition in New Zealand. Auckland were the winners of Division 1.

== Division 1 ==
The following table gives the final standings:

Relegated to Division Two

Pos	Team	Pld	W	D	L	PF	PA	PD	Pts
1	Auckland	10	10	0	0	375	90	+285	40
2	Wellington	10	9	0	1	286	163	+122	36
3	Otago	10	6	0	4	176	150	+26	27
4	Bay of Plenty	10	6	0	4	257	228	+29	26
5	Canterbury	10	5	0	5	201	183	+18	22
6	Waikato	10	4	1	5	201	227	-26	19
7	Counties	10	4	0	6	186	244	-58	19
8	North Auckland	10	4	0	6	180	206	-26	18
9	Manawatu	10	3	0	7	211	273	-62	14
10	Taranaki	10	2	0	8	128	302	-174	9
11	Wairarapa Bush	10	1	1	8	123	258	-135	9

== Division 2 ==
The following table gives the final standings:

Relegated to Division Three

Pos	Team	Pld	W	D	L	PF	PA	PD	Pts
1	North Harbour	7	7	0	0	237	65	+172	28
2	Hawke's Bay	7	5	0	2	196	144	+52	21
3	Marlborough	7	5	0	2	156	92	+64	20
4	Southland	7	4	0	3	212	124	+88	18
5	King Country	7	2	0	5	89	159	-70	9
6	South Canterbury	7	2	0	5	126	200	-74	9
7	Mid Canterbury	7	2	0	5	71	202	-131	8
8	Wanganui	7	1	0	6	62	163	-101	4

== Promotion/relegation ==
Division Two winner North Harbour won their playoff match with Hawke's Bay to be promoted to Division One to replace Wairarapa Bush who were relegated. Division Three winner Poverty Bay were elevated to Division Two to replace Wanganui who were relegated.
