= 1974 Fiji rugby union tour of New Zealand =

Summary
P	W	D	L
Total
13	8	0	5
Test match
2	0	0	2
Opponent
P	W	D	L
New Zealand Maori
2	0	0	2

The 1974 Fiji rugby union tour of New Zealand was a series of matches played in May–June 1974 in New Zealand by Fiji national rugby union team.

== Results ==
24 July 1974

Buller	3 - 25	Fiji XV
	report

Victoria Square, Westport

27 July 1974

Canterbury	9 - 4	Fiji XV
	report

Lancaster Park, Christchurch

31 July 1974

North Otago	11 - 14	Fiji XV
	report

Centennial Park, Oamaru

3 August 1974

Otago	7 - 9	Fiji XV
	report

Carisbrook, Dunedin

7 August 1974

Marlborough	21 - 13	Fiji XV
	report

Lansdowne Park, Blenheim

10 August 1974

Waikato	13 - 7	Fiji XV
	report

Rugby Park, Hamilton

14 August 1974

King Country	3 - 38	Fiji XV
	report

Taumarunui Domain, Taumarunui

17 August 1974

NZ Maori (New Zealand)	24 - 9	Fiji
	report

Eden Park, Auckland

21 August 1974

Hawke's Bay	21 - 28	Fiji XV
	report

McLean Park, Napier

24 August 1974

North Auckland	8 - 21	Fiji XV
	report

Okara Park, Whangārei

28 August 1974

Wanganui	9 - 28	Fiji XV
	report

Spriggens Park, Wanganui

31 August 1974

NZ Maori (New Zealand)	39 - 25	Fiji
	report

Athletic Park, Wellington

2 September 1974

Auckland Invitation XV	20 - 31	Fiji XV
	report

Eden Park, Auckland
