= National Provincial Championship (1976–2005) =

New Zealand rugby union competition

- Sport: Rugby union
- Inaugural season: 1976
- Ceased: 2005
- Country: New Zealand (NZR)
- Most titles: Auckland (15 titles)
- Website: provincial.rugby
- Related competitions: Farah Palmer Cup; Heartland Championship; Ranfurly Shield

The National Provincial Championship, often simply called the NPC, was an annual promotion and relegation rugby union competition in men's domestic New Zealand rugby. First played during the 1976 season, it was the highest level of competition in New Zealand until Super Rugby launched in 1996. It was organised by New Zealand Rugby (NZR) and ceased following the 2005 season.

The league was restructured into two distinct competitions for 2006. The National Provincial Championship would include professional and semi-professional players, and consist of the top fourteen financial and best performing regional teams. For sponsorship reasons it was rebranded as the Air New Zealand Cup. The remaining teams formed a new amateur competition known as the Heartland Championship.

Twenty-eight teams competed since the inception of the competition in 1976. Auckland were the most successful union with fifteen titles and Bay of Plenty were the inaugural champions. Six other teams had won the title: Canterbury (5), Wellington (4), Otago (2), Counties Manukau (1), Manawatu (1), and Waikato (1).

== History ==
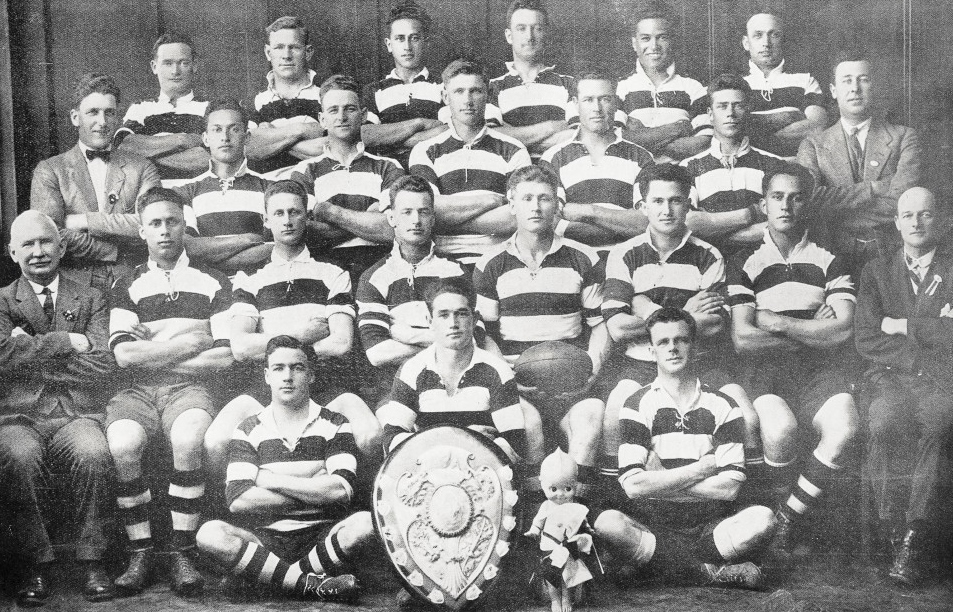
Hawke's Bay occupying the Ranfurly Shield in 1923.

The first form of competition came in 1904 with the introduction of the Ranfurly Shield as a challenge trophy. Each year, fixtures were arranged in Wellington during the annual meeting of the New Zealand Rugby Football Union, where an elected representative from each provincial union would propose dates and opponents that ideally avoided conflicts with local club competitions. Across the country, neighbouring regions organised regular matches for challenge trophies. One of the most prestigious competitions, the Hanan Shield, was established in 1946 by Timaru's former mayor, A.E.S. Hanan, and was contested by Mid Canterbury, South Canterbury, and North Otago. Another significant trophy, the Seddon Shield, was first challenged in 1906. Named after former New Zealand premier Richard Seddon, it featured representative teams from Buller, Nelson Bays, Marlborough, and the West Coast. In the North Island, starting in the King Country and moving north, eleven teams competed for the Coronation Shield.

Given the numerous competitions across New Zealand, there was a clear need for a national tournament. In 1972, Barry Smith proposed an inter-provincial competition to the Auckland Rugby Union. After gaining approval, the proposal was brought to the New Zealand Rugby Football Union's annual conference in early 1974. It included an overview of the scheme, addressing finance, travel, sponsorship opportunities, implications for club and sub-union competitions, traditional representative matches, international laws, and Sunday play. Following discussions in October 1975, modifications were made and ultimately accepted by all provinces. Radio New Zealand secured sponsorship rights worth NZD 100,000 and helped market the new competition, later joined by Lion Breweries, National Mutual, and Air New Zealand. Teams were divided into two divisions based on their performance over the previous five years. The premier division included Auckland, Bay of Plenty, Canterbury, Counties, Hawke's Bay, Manawatu, Marlborough, North Auckland, Otago, Southland, and Wellington, determined by a ranking system. The remaining provinces, Buller, East Coast, Horowhenua, King Country, Mid Canterbury, Nelson Bays, North Otago, Poverty Bay, South Canterbury, Taranaki, Thames Valley, Waikato, Wairarapa Bush, Wanganui and the West Coast were split into North Island and South Island sub-divisions, with the potential for promotion to the top division.

Between 1980 and the early 2000s, Auckland experienced a golden era, dominating competitions and consistently retaining the Ranfurly Shield. During this time, they reached eighteen finals, finishing as runners-up multiple times, and secured over half of the available competition titles, totaling fifteen. This remarkable run included a record sixty-one Ranfurly Shield defenses, five South Pacific Championship titles, and recognition as the Halberg Awards Team of the Year in 1992.

Canterbury emerged as the only team to consistently challenge Auckland's supremacy, with several matches becoming historic. The 1985 clash, where Auckland ended Canterbury's record-equaling streak of twenty-five matches, was famously dubbed the "Match of the Century." In front of a record crowd of 52,000 at Lancaster Park, Canterbury nearly staged a stunning comeback from a 24–0 half-time deficit, but Auckland held on to win 28–23, setting a new benchmark with sixty-one consecutive defences over eight years.

Auckland's fortunes waned with the professionalisation of rugby, officially declared in August 1995. The introduction of Super 12 in 1996 marked the end of their dominance as many international players became unavailable. Notable stars like Sean Fitzpatrick, who captained the All Blacks and played 154 games for Auckland, and Grant Fox, who set a record for the most shield points (932), were pivotal during this era, along with John Kirwan, who scored forty-four tries.

== Teams ==
Locations of the Bunnings NPC teams.

The fourteen provincial unions that have participated in the current National Provincial Championship since its founding in 2006 are listed below. Ten teams are situated in the North Island and four teams in the South Island.

The NPC, which comes after Super Rugby and international rugby, constitutes the "third tier" of rugby union in New Zealand. Below this tier are numerous club competitions, which are organised by each provincial union.

Team	Union	Established	Location	Venue
Auckland	Auckland Rugby Union	1883; 143 years ago	Auckland	Eden Park
Bay of Plenty	Bay of Plenty Rugby Union	1911; 115 years ago	Tauranga	Tauranga Domain^{[a]}
Buller	Buller Rugby Football Union	1894; 132 years ago	Westport	Victoria Square
Canterbury	Canterbury Rugby Football Union	1879; 147 years ago	Christchurch	Jade Stadium
Central Vikings	Central Vikings Rugby Union	1996; 30 years ago^{[b]}	Napier	McLean Park
Counties Manukau	Counties Manukau Rugby Football Union^{[c]}	1955; 71 years ago	Pukekohe	Pukekohe Stadium
East Coast	East Coast Rugby Football Union	1922; 104 years ago	Ruatoria	Whakarua Park
Hawke's Bay	Hawke's Bay Rugby Union	1884; 142 years ago	Napier	McLean Park
Horowhenua Kapiti	Horowhenua Kapiti Rugby Football Union^{[d]}	1893; 133 years ago	Levin	Levin Domain
King Country	King Country Rugby Union	1922; 104 years ago	Te Kuiti	Rugby Park
Manawatu	Manawatu Rugby Union	1886; 140 years ago	Palmerston North	Central Energy Trust Arena
Marlborough	Marlborough Rugby Union	1888; 138 years ago	Blenheim	Lansdowne Park
Mid Canterbury	Mid Canterbury Rugby Union	1904; 122 years ago	Ashburton	Ashburton Showgrounds
Nelson Bays	Nelson Bays Rugby Union	1968; 58 years ago	Nelson	Trafalgar Park
North Harbour	North Harbour Rugby Union	1985; 41 years ago	Auckland	North Harbour Stadium
North Otago	North Otago Rugby Football Union	1927; 99 years ago	Oamaru	Centennial Park
Northland	Northland Rugby Union^{[e]}	1920; 106 years ago	Whangārei	Okara Park
Otago	Otago Rugby Football Union	1881; 145 years ago	Dunedin	Carisbrook
Poverty Bay	Poverty Bay Rugby Football Union	1890; 136 years ago	Gisborne	Rugby Park
South Canterbury	South Canterbury Rugby Football Union	1888; 138 years ago	Timaru	Fraser Park
Southland	Rugby Southland	1887; 139 years ago	Invercargill	Rugby Park Stadium
Taranaki	Taranaki Rugby Football Union	1885; 141 years ago	New Plymouth	Yarrow Stadium
Thames Valley	Thames Valley Rugby Union	1922; 104 years ago	Paeroa	Boyd Park
Waikato	Waikato Rugby Union	1921; 105 years ago	Hamilton	Waikato Stadium
Wairarapa Bush	Wairarapa Bush Rugby Football Union	1971; 55 years ago	Masterton	Memorial Park
Wellington	Wellington Rugby Football Union	1879; 147 years ago	Wellington	Sky Stadium
West Coast	West Coast Rugby Union	1890; 136 years ago	Greymouth	John Sturgeon Park
Wanganui	Wanganui Rugby Football Union	1888; 138 years ago	Wanganui	Cooks Gardens

^{a} One of the two home fields used by the Bay of Plenty Rugby Union is the Tauranga Domain. It serves as both their main stadium and training facility, with the Rotorua International Stadium serving as a temporary location for the occasional fixture.
^{b} A combined team of Hawke's Bay and Manawatu for the 1997 and 1998 NPC seasons
^{c} Named Counties Rugby Football Union until 1995
^{d} Named Horowhenua Rugby Football Union until 1997
^{e} Named North Auckland Rugby Union until 1994

== Champions ==
The winner of the NPC trophy, also known as the Rugby Cup from the previous tournament, is chosen annually in New Zealand Rugby's National Provincial Championship final match since 1992. After the semi-finals, a New Zealand city is selected to host the contest, with the semi-final victor with the highest seed receiving home field advantage. Prior to 1992 the top team on the points table was the winner. The competition was split into three divisions, with division one being acknowledged and recognised as the champion.

Edition	Year	Champion	Result	Runner-up	Venue	Location	Winning coach
1	1976	Bay of Plenty	No result	Manawatu	No play-offs		Eric Anderson
2	1977	Canterbury	No result	Counties	No play-offs		Tiny Hill
3	1978	Wellington	No result	Counties	No play-offs		Ian Upston
4	1979	Counties	No result	Auckland	No play-offs		Hiwi Tauroa
5	1980	Manawatu	No result	Auckland	No play-offs		Graham Hamer
6	1981	Wellington	No result	Manawatu	No play-offs		Ian Upston
7	1982	Auckland	No result	Canterbury	No play-offs		John Hart
8	1983	Canterbury	No result	Wellington	No play-offs		Alex Wyllie
9	1984	Auckland	No result	Canterbury	No play-offs		John Hart
10	1985	Auckland	No result	Canterbury	No play-offs		John Hart
11	1986	Wellington	No result	Auckland	No play-offs		Earle Kirton
12	1987	Auckland	No result	Wellington	No play-offs		Maurice Trapp
13	1988	Auckland	No result	Wellington	No play-offs		Maurice Trapp
14	1989	Auckland	No result	Canterbury	No play-offs		Maurice Trapp
15	1990	Auckland	No result	Waikato	No play-offs		Maurice Trapp
16	1991	Otago	No result	Auckland	No play-offs		Laurie Mains
17	1992	Waikato	40–5	Otago	Rugby Park	Hamilton	Kevin Greene
18	1993	Auckland	27–18	Otago	Eden Park	Auckland	Graham Henry
19	1994	Auckland	22–16	North Harbour	Onewa Domain	Auckland	Graham Henry
20	1995	Auckland	23–19	Otago	Eden Park	Auckland	Graham Henry
21	1996	Auckland	46–15	Counties Manukau	Eden Park	Auckland	Graham Henry
22	1997	Canterbury	44–13	Counties Manukau	Lancaster Park	Christchurch	Robbie Deans
23	1998	Otago	49–20	Waikato	Carisbrook	Dunedin	Tony Gilbert
24	1999	Auckland	24–18	Wellington	Eden Park	Auckland	Wayne Pivac
25	2000	Wellington	34–29	Canterbury	Jade Stadium	Christchurch	Dave Rennie
26	2001	Canterbury	30–19	Otago	Jade Stadium	Christchurch	Steve Hansen
27	2002	Auckland	40–28	Waikato	Waikato Stadium	Hamilton	Wayne Pivac
28	2003	Auckland	41–29	Wellington	Westpac Stadium	Wellington	Wayne Pivac
29	2004	Canterbury	40–27	Wellington	Westpac Stadium	Wellington	Brian McLean
30	2005	Auckland	39–11	Otago	Eden Park	Auckland	Pat Lam

=== Second-tier champions ===
The 2002 season saw the introduction of the Meads Cup and Lochore Cup, which were contested by unions from the second and third divisions respectively. North Otago and Hawke's Bay were the first honourable winners. New Zealand Rugby made the decision to incorporate the trophies in the new Heartland Championship tournament when the National Provincial Championship was discontinued in 2005. The silverware commemorate the names of Sir Brian Lochore and Sir Colin Meads, two legendary international rugby players from New Zealand.

1976—1984
Season	Division 2 North		Division 2 South	
Season	Champion	Runner-up	Champion	Runner-up
1976	Taranaki	Wanganui	South Canterbury	Buller
1977	North Auckland	Waikato	South Canterbury	Mid Canterbury
1978	Bay of Plenty	Waikato	Marlborough	Nelson Bays
1979	Hawke's Bay	Waikato	Marlborough	Mid Canterbury
1980	Waikato	Taranaki	Mid Canterbury	Marlborough
1981	Wairarapa Bush	Taranaki	South Canterbury	Marlborough
1982	Taranaki	Wanganui	Southland	Mid Canterbury
1983	Taranaki	Wanganui	Mid Canterbury	Southland
1984	Taranaki	Wanganui	Southland	Marlborough

1985—2005
Season	Division 2		Division 3	
Season	Champion	Runner-up	Champion	Runner-up
1985	Taranaki	Hawke's Bay	North Harbour	Nelson Bays
1986	Waikato	North Harbour	South Canterbury	East Coast
1987	North Harbour	Hawke's Bay	Poverty Bay	Horowhenua
1988	Hawke's Bay	Marlborough	Thames Valley	Wanganui
1989	Southland	Manawatu	Wanganui	South Canterbury
1990	Hawke's Bay	King Country	Thames Valley	Horowhenua
1991	King Country	Southland	South Canterbury	Mid Canterbury
1992	Taranaki	Counties	Nelson Bays	Horowhenua
1993	Counties	Bay of Plenty	Horowhenua	Wanganui
1994	Southland	Hawke's Bay	Mid Canterbury	Poverty Bay
1995	Taranaki	Northland	Thames Valley	Poverty Bay
1996	Southland	Northland	Wanganui	Marlborough
1997	Northland	Central Vikings	Marlborough	North Otago
1998	Central Vikings	Bay of Plenty	Mid Canterbury	Horowhenua Kapiti
1999	Nelson Bays	Bay of Plenty	East Coast	Poverty Bay
2000	Bay of Plenty	Nelson Bays	East Coast	North Otago
2001	Hawke's Bay	East Coast	South Canterbury	North Otago
2002	Hawke's Bay	Counties Manukau	North Otago	Horowhenua Kapiti
2003	Hawke's Bay	Nelson Bays	Wanganui	King Country
2004	Nelson Bays	Hawke's Bay	Poverty Bay	Wairarapa Bush
2005	Hawke's Bay	Nelson Bays	Wairarapa Bush	Horowhenua Kapiti

== Honours ==
The inaugural trophy was first displayed at the tournaments' launch at Auckland's Mt Smart Stadium in July 2006. It was also stated that it would be on display for the general public to witness during the competition's opening game, which was played in Napier between Hawke's Bay and Canterbury. Thorkild Hansen, the son of Jens Hoyer Hansen, crafted the trophy by hand. Black basalt from the Bombay Hills was used to create the polished stone base by Waihi stone carver Jeff Beckwith. The 45-centimeter-tall cup was constructed of 2.7 kilograms of sterling silver and weighed 3.9 kilograms.

=== Ranfurly Shield ===
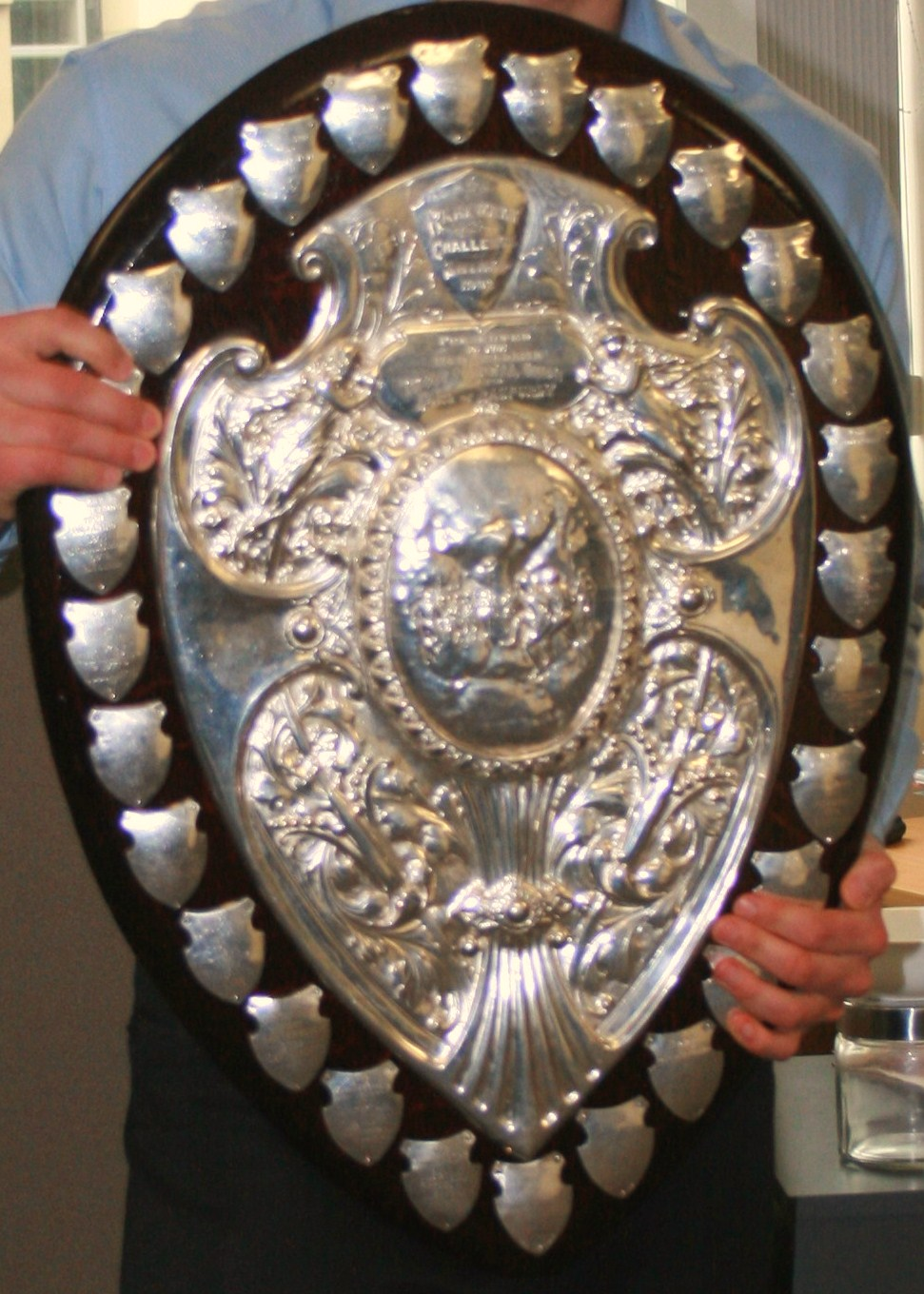

The Ranfurly Shield, colloquially known as the Log o' Wood, is perhaps the most prestigious trophy in New Zealand's domestic rugby union competition. First presented to Auckland in 1902, the Shield is based on a challenge system, rather than a league or knockout competition as with most football trophies. The holding union must defend the Shield in challenge matches, and a successful challenger becomes the new holder of the Shield. The Shield holder at the end of each season is required to accept at least seven challenges for the following year. All home games during league play, but not during knockout playoffs, in the NPC or Heartland Championship are automatic challenges. The remaining Shield defences must be made up of challenges from unions in the other domestic competition.

=== Player of the Year ===
The player of the year award was given to the best player during the season and was selected by a committee of committee members, retired players, and media representatives.

Season	Player	Position	Team	Ref
1994	Waisake Sotutu	Wing	Auckland	
1995	Olo Brown	Prop	Auckland	
1996	Justin Marshall	Half-back	Canterbury	
1997	Todd Blackadder	Flanker	Canterbury	
1998	Tony Brown	First five-eighth	Otago	
1999	Filo Tiatia	Number 8	Wellington	
2000	Andrew Slater	Lock	Taranaki	
2001	Richie McCaw	Flanker	Canterbury	
2002	Keith Lowen	Centre	Waikato	
2003	Iliesa Tanivula	Wing	Auckland	
2004	Richie McCaw	Flanker	Canterbury	
2005	Chris Smylie	Half-back	Otago	

== See also ==
- Rugby union in New Zealand
- History of rugby union in New Zealand
- List of New Zealand rugby union teams
- Heartland Championship
- Ranfurly Shield
- Farah Palmer Cup
