= 1980 National Provincial Championship =

New Zealand rugby union tournament in 1980

The 1980 season was the fifth year of the National Provincial Championship (NPC), a provincial rugby union competition in New Zealand. Manawatu were the winners of Division 1.

== Division 1 ==
The following table gives the final standings:

Relegated to Division Two

Pos	Team	Pld	W	D	L	PF	PA	PD	Pts
1	Manawatu	10	9	1	0	215	114	+101	18
2	Wellington	10	8	1	1	182	94	+88	17
3	Counties	10	8	2	0	197	87	+110	16
4	North Auckland	10	6	4	0	122	107	+15	12
5	Auckland	10	5	5	0	160	98	+62	10
6	Southland	10	4	5	1	119	130	-11	9
7	Canterbury	10	4	6	0	165	161	+4	8
8	Hawke's Bay	10	4	6	0	160	172	-12	8
9	Bay of Plenty	10	4	6	0	171	215	-44	8
10	Otago	10	2	8	0	112	206	-94	4
11	South Canterbury	10	0	10	0	55	274	-219	0

== Promotion/relegation ==
Division Two North winner Waikato defeated South Island division two winner Mid Canterbury 22 points to 9. This gave Waikato the chance to play the bottom first division side, South Canterbury, for a place in the first division in 1981. Waikato defeated South Canterbury 22–13 and were promoted to Division One.
