= 1982 National Provincial Championship =

New Zealand rugby union tournament in 1982

The 1982 season was the seventh year of the National Provincial Championship (NPC), a provincial rugby union competition in New Zealand. Auckland were the winners of Division 1.

== Division 1 ==
The following table gives the final standings:

Pos	Team	Pld	W	D	L	PF	PA	PD	Pts
1	Auckland	10	8	0	2	214	105	+109	16
2	Canterbury	10	7	1	2	219	132	+87	15
3	Counties	10	7	1	7	171	113	+58	15
4	Waikato	10	7	0	3	180	156	+24	14
5	Manawatu	10	6	0	4	214	134	+80	12
6	Wellington	10	4	1	5	181	189	-8	9
7	Hawke's Bay	10	4	0	6	167	150	+17	8
8	Wairarapa Bush	10	3	1	6	99	219	-120	7
9	North Auckland	10	3	0	7	140	157	-17	6
10	Otago	10	2	0	8	137	237	-100	4
11	Bay of Plenty	10	2	0	8	99	222	-123	4

== Promotion/relegation ==
Division Two North winner Taranaki challenged Bay of Plenty for promotion. Bay of Plenty won 23 points to 4 and so remained in Division One for the 1983 season.
