= Alefosio Aho =

New Zealand rugby union player

- Born: 15 February 2003 (age 23) New Zealand
- Height: 199 cm (6 ft 6 in)
- Weight: 132 kg (291 lb; 20 st 11 lb)
- School: Saint Kentigern College

Rugby union career
- Position: Lock
- Current team: Southland
Senior career
Years	Team	Apps	(Points)
2024	Otago	5	(0)
2025	Southland	10	(5)
2025	Waratahs	0	(0)
2026	Moana Pasifika	4	(0)
- Correct as of 17 June 2026

Alefosio Aho (born 15 February 2003) is a New Zealand rugby union player, who played for Moana Pasifika in Super Rugby and plays for Southland in the National Provincial Championship. His preferred position is lock.

== Early career ==
Aho attended Saint Kentigern College and came through the Auckland academy, representing New Zealand U19 in 2022. He moved to Dunedin in 2023 to join the Otago academy and represented the university side at club level. Following moving to Australia, he represented West Harbour.

== Professional career ==
Aho represented Otago in the National Provincial Championship in 2024, being named in their full squad for the 2024 Bunnings NPC.. In 2025, he shifted south and played for Southland.

Aho was named in the Waratahs squad for the 2025 Super Rugby Pacific season in November 2024, but didn't play a single game for the club.

On 6 November 2025, Aho was named in the Moana Pasifika squad for the 2026 Super Rugby Pacific season.
