= Trevor Morris (rugby union) =

- Born: Trevor James Morris; 3 January 1942 (age 84) Nelson, New Zealand
- Height: 1.79 m (5 ft 10 in)
- Weight: 79 kg (174 lb)
- School: Nelson College
- University: University of Canterbury
- Occupation: School teacher

Rugby union career
- Position: Full-back
Provincial / State sides
Years	Team	Apps	(Points)
1966–68	Golden Bay-Motueka	18	
1969–72	Nelson Bays	31	
1972	South Island	1	
International career
Years	Team	Apps	(Points)
1972–73	New Zealand	3	(33)

Trevor James Morris (born 3 January 1942) is a New Zealand rugby union player and teacher. A full-back, Morris represented Golden Bay-Motueka and then Nelson Bays at a provincial level, and was a member of the New Zealand national side, the All Blacks, in 1972 and 1973. He played 23 matches for the All Blacks including three internationals.
