= Tayne Harvey =

New Zealand rugby union player

- Born: 30 May 2005 (age 21) New Zealand
- Height: 187 cm (6 ft 2 in)
- Weight: 100 kg (220 lb; 15 st 10 lb)
- School: Palmerston North Boys' High School

Rugby union career
- Position: Midfielder / Wing
- Current team: Highlanders, Southland
Senior career
Years	Team	Apps	(Points)
2024–	Southland	8	(0)
2026–	Highlanders		
- Correct as of 18 November 2025
International career
Years	Team	Apps	(Points)
2025	New Zealand U20	6	(0)
- Correct as of 18 November 2025

Tayne Harvey (born 30 May 2005) is a New Zealand rugby union player, who plays for the Highlanders and Southland. His preferred position is midfield or wing.

== Early career ==
Harvey attended Palmerston North Boys' High School where he played rugby for the first XV. His performances for the school earned him selection for the New Zealand Schools side in 2023. Having signed with the Southland academy in 2023, he was also named in the Highlanders U20 side in 2025. In 2025, he was named in the New Zealand U20 squad.

== Professional career ==
Harvey has represented Southland in the National Provincial Championship since 2024, being named in the squad for the 2025 Bunnings NPC. He was named in the Highlanders wider training group for the 2026 Super Rugby Pacific season.
