= Hua Tamariki =

New Zealand rugby union player

- Born: Hua Tamariki; 5 November 1983 (age 43) Tokoroa, Waikato, New Zealand
- Height: 1.90 m (6 ft 3 in)
- Weight: 106 kg (16 st 10 lb)
- School: Verdon College

Rugby union career
- Position(s): Number 8, Flanker
Amateur team(s)
Years	Team	Apps	(Points)
- Invercargill Marist
Provincial / State sides
Years	Team	Apps	(Points)
- Southland

Hua Tamariki (born 5 November 1983) is a New Zealand rugby union player. He plays as a Number 8 or Blindside Flanker. Tamariki represents the Southland Stags in the Air New Zealand Cup.
