= Lansdowne Park, Blenheim =

Rugby stadium in Blenheim, New Zealand

Lansdowne Park
- Interactive map of Lansdowne Park
- Location: Blenheim, New Zealand
- Coordinates: 41°29′56″S 173°57′27″E
- Capacity: 15,000

Tenants
- Tasman; Harlequins; Central

Lansdowne Park, a rugby stadium in Blenheim, New Zealand, is one of the two home grounds for National Provincial Championship team Tasman, the other being Trafalgar Park in Nelson. It was also home to Marlborough until they merged with Nelson Bays to form Tasman, and is currently home to two Blenheim clubs, Harlequins and Central.

It also served as Russia's training base for the 2011 Rugby World Cup, and hosted a 2016 pre-season Super Rugby match between the Crusaders and Hurricanes.
