= Thames Valley Rugby Football Union =

New Zealand regional sport governing body

Thames Valley

Club information
- Full name: Thames Valley Rugby Football Union
- Nickname: Swamp Foxes
- Colours: Gold, Red, Black
- Founded: 1921
- Website: http://www.thamesvalleyswampfoxes.co.nz/

Current details
- Ground: Boyd Park, Te Aroha Paeroa Domain, Paeroa
- Competition: Heartland Championship

The Thames Valley Rugby Football Union (TVRFU) is the governing body of rugby union in the region of Thames Valley in the North Island of New Zealand. Thames Valley Rugby Football Union was founded in 1921 when it broke away from the now defunct South Auckland Rugby Union. The Thames Rugby Union, a sub-union that had remained affiliated with the Auckland Rugby Football Union, eventually joined the Thames Valley Union in 1951.

Their senior representative team competes in the Heartland Championship and plays at Boyd Park, Te Aroha and Paeroa Domain, Paeroa.

== History ==
Rugby has been played in the region since the 1870s and 1880s.

The Ohinemuri Union was founded at Waihi in 1896, and by 1904 this union was named the Goldfields Rugby Union. It consisted of a number of even smaller unions, but was itself a sub-union of the Auckland Rugby Football Union (ARFU), and was therefore not directly affiliated to the New Zealand Rugby Union (NZRU). Along with a number of other sub-unions, the Goldfields ceded from the ARFU to form the South Auckland Rugby Football Union in 1909.

Several sub-unions split away from the South Auckland Union between 1909 and 1921 to form new independent unions, and in 1921 the Hauraki Plains, Paeroa, Piako, Waihi sub-unions did the same to form the Thames Valley Rugby Football Union (TVRFU). The union was from then on directly affiliated to the NZRU. The Thames sub union, which had remained affiliated to the ARFU up until then, joined the TVRFU in 1951.

== Club rugby ==
Thames Valley Rugby Football Union is made up of 12 clubs:

- Te Aroha College Old Boys Rugby And Sports (COBRAS)
- Coromandel RFSC
- Hauraki North RFC
- Mercury Bay Rugby and Sports Club
- Ngatea Rugby and Sports Club
- Paeroa Rugby and Sports Club
- Tairua Rugby and Sports Club
- Thames Rugby and Sports Club
- Waihi Athletic
- Waihou
- Whangamata Rugby and Sports Club

=== Thames Valley Club Champions ===
Year	Champion	Runner Up	Score
1953	Patetonga		
1954	Waitakaruru		
1955	Waitakaruru		
1956	Thames United		
1957	Paeroa Old Boys		
1958	Thames United		
1959	Thames United		
1960	Waihou		
1961	Waihou		
1962	Waihou		
1963	Thames United		
1964	Thames United		
1965	Paeroa Old Boys		
1966	Paeroa Old Boys		
1967	Paeroa Old Boys		
1968	Paeroa West		
1969	Thames United		
1970	Kerepehi		
1971	Hauraki North		
1972	Hauraki North		
1973	Waihou		
1974	Waihou		
1975	Waihou		
1976	Huimai		
1977	Paeroa West		
1978	Paeroa West		
1979	Te Aroha College Old Boys		
1980	Paeroa West		
1981	Paeroa West		
1982	Paeroa West		
1983	Paeroa West		
1984	Paeroa West		
1985	Paeroa West		
1986	Paeroa West		
1987	Paeroa West		
1988	Paeroa West		
1989	Thames		
1990	Paeroa West		
1991	Waihou		
1992	Hauraki North & Thames		
1993	Te Aroha College Old Boys		
1994	Hauraki North		
1995	Thames		
1996	Thames		
1997	Thames		
1998	Waihou		
1999	Hauraki North	Te Aroha College Old Boys	23-11
2000	Thames	Waihou	20-3
2001	Paeroa West	Thames	15-13
2002	Thames	Paeroa West	23-13
2003	Thames	Paeroa West	23-17
2004	Hauraki North	Paeroa West	14-8
2005	Waihou	Mercury Bay	29-25
2006	Waihou	Whangamata	27-6
2007	Hauraki North & Waihou	Drawn	10-10
2008	Paeroa West	Waihou	12-8
2009	Paeroa West	Waihou	25-16
2010	Hauraki North	Paeroa West	22-20
2011	Paeroa West	Hauraki North	22-16
2012	Thames	Te Aroha College Old Boys	13-8
2013	Hauraki North	Tairua	31-25
2014	Te Aroha College Old Boys	Waihou	31-27
2015	Waihou & Mercury Bay	Drawn	22-22
2016	Waihou	Waihi Athletic	29-14
2017	Hauraki North	Waihi Athletic	28-27
2018	Waihi Athletic	Thames	26-17
2019	Te Aroha College Old Boys	Thames	25-23
2020	Whangamata Rugby and Sports	Te Aroha College Old Boys	21-15
2021	Mercury Bay	Thames R&S	12-10
2022	Thames	Te Aroha College Old Boys	40-35
2023	Whangamata	Hauraki North	33-20
2024	Waihi Athletic	Paeroa	37-19
2025	Waihi Athletic	Paeroa	46-20
2026	Waihi Athletic	Thames	20-19

=== Women's premiership ===
- 2026 - Paeroa 48-12 Thames
- 2025 - Coromandel 38-17 Paeroa

== Provincial rugby ==
Thames Valley were the winners of the NPC 3rd division in 1988, 1990 and 1995.

On 27 October 2018 Thames Valley won their first Heartland Championship by defeating South Canterbury 17-12 in the Meads Cup final in Timaru. Thames Valley also won the Meads Cup in 2024 and they were runners up to South Canterbury in 2021.

Thames Valley have yet to win the Lochore Cup.

=== Heartland Championship placings ===
Heartland Championship results
Year	Pld	W	D	L	PF	PA	PD	BP	Pts	Place	Playoffs		
Year	Pld	W	D	L	PF	PA	PD	BP	Pts	Place	Qual	Semifinal	Final
2006	8	4	0	4	192	177	−15	5	21	9th	Lochore Cup	Lost 15–17 to King Country	—
2007	8	2	0	6	147	215	−68	4	12	10th	Lochore Cup	Lost 3–65 to Poverty Bay	—
2008	8	1	0	7	107	225	−118	1	5	11th	No	—	
2009	8	0	0	8	110	237	−127	4	4	12th	No	—	
2010	8	3	0	5	158	188	−40	3	15	6th	No	—	
2011	8	4	1	3	229	181	+48	3	21	7th	Lochore Cup	Lost 27–30 to South Canterbury	—
2012	8	2	0	6	203	263	−60	3	11	11th	No	—	
2013	8	4	0	4	153	200	−37	1	17	8th	Lochore Cup	Lost 8–14 to South Canterbury	—
2014	8	3	1	4	139	135	+4	3	17	9th	No	—	
2015	8	3	0	5	206	255	−49	4	16	9th	No	—	
2016	8	0	1	7	158	324	−166	1	5	11th	No	—	
2017	8	3	0	5	209	174	35	4	4	9th	No	—	
2018	8	5	0	3	274	233	41	8	28	4th	Meads Cup	Won 17-07 against Wanganui	Won 17-12 against South Canterbury
2019	8	6	0	2	240	163	+77	6	30	1st	Meads Cup	Lost 15–20 to Whanganui	—
2021	8	7	0	1	291	148	+143	5	33	2nd	Meads Cup	No semi-final played	Lost 16–35 to South Canterbury
2022	8	5	0	3	247	189	+58	7	27	3rd	Meads Cup	Lost 15–18 to Whanganui	—
2023	8	6	0	2	246	220	+26	7	31	3rd	Meads Cup	Lost 3–38 to Whanganui	—
2024	8	6	0	2	348	190	+158	7	31	3rd	Meads Cup	Won 38-15 against Whanganui	Won 37-29 against Mid Canterbury
2025	8	5	0	3	335	172	+163	9	29	3rd	Meads Cup	Won 61–31 against South Canterbury	Lost 18-21 to Mid Canterbury
2026	8	5	0	3	384	314	+70	9	29	1st	Meads Cup	Lost 28-37 to Mid Canterbury	—

There was no Heartland Championship in the 2020 season due to Covid-19 restrictions.

== Ranfurly Shield ==
Thames Valley has never held the Ranfurly Shield. In 2019 Thames Valley lost 41–21 against Otago in a solid display at Wanaka — at one point leading 13–0.

The following are Thames Valley's Ranfurly Shield matches since 1960.

13 August 1960	Auckland	22-6	Thames Valley

7 August 1962	Auckland	24-9	Thames Valley

13 August 1975	Auckland	22-0	Thames Valley

4 August 1979	North Auckland	39-3	Thames Valley

14 September 1980	Waikato	16-7	Thames Valley

9 July 1986	Auckland	97-0	Thames Valley

16 August 1989	Auckland	58-7	Thames Valley

6 June 1994	Waikato	74-3	Thames Valley

28 July 1999	Waikato	37-8	Thames Valley

30 August 2007	North Harbour	69-0	Thames Valley

2 July 2014	Counties Manukau	68–0	Thames Valley	ECOLight Stadium, Pukekohe
18:00 (NZST)	Try: Jared Page (3); Maama Vaipulu (2); Kane Hancy; Toni Pulu; Karl Ropati; Luke Graham; Penalty try Con: Jared Page (6/10); Pen: Jared Page (2/2)	Report	Cards: Aaron MacDonald (yellow card)

6 June 2016	Thames Valley	13–83	Waikato	Paeroa Domain, Paeroa
	Try: Brett Ranga; Jone Koroinsagana; Pen: Josh O'Flaherty	Report	Try: Iliesa Tavuyara (3); Whetu Douglas (2); Atu Moli (2); Latu Talakai; Jake Ale; Jason Robertson; Hame Faiva; Sevu Reece; Murray Iti; Con: Jason Robertson (6); Matt Lansdown (3)

13 July 2019	Otago	41–21	Thames Valley	Wanaka Showgrounds, Wānaka
14:05 NZST	Try: Sekonaia Pole 40'; James Lentjes 45'; Ben Miller 52'; Aleki Morris 60'; Dylan Nel 71'; Slade McDowall 80'; Con: Ben Miller (4/6) 40', 52', 61', 72'; Faddes (0/1); Pen: Ben Miller (1/2) 78'	Report	Try: Harry Lafituanai (2) 29', 75'; Con: Reece Broughton (1/1) 30'; Cole Berridge (0/1); Pen: Reece Broughton (3/5) 8', 20', 48'; Cards: Lance Easton (yellow card) 44'	Attendance: 3,500; Referee: Nick Webster (New Zealand)

19 July 2025	Taranaki	97-0	Thames Valley	Manaia Domain, Manaia

== All Blacks ==
Two Thames Valley players have been selected for the All Blacks:

- Kevin Barry: 23 matches from 1962 to 1964
- Bob O'Dea: 5 matches on the 1953–54 tour of Britain, Ireland, France and North America

== Historical results ==
Results each year for Thames Valley up to 2005.

=== 1922-49 ===
YEAR			TEAM	WIN	LOSS	DRAW	Comments
1922	H		Auckland		3-18		
1922			Waikato		3-12		
1922	H		Waikato		3-14		
1923			Waikato		6-15		
1923	H		Wanganui	10-6			
1923	H		Auckland B		15-24		
1924	H		Waikato	21-6			
1924		*	T.Valley/A/NA/Wai v HB/PB/BOP/EC	18-9			
1925			Waikato		5-18		
1925	H		King Country	17-9			
1925	H		Auckland B	14-5			
1926	H		Waikato		6-31		
1926			King Country	6-3			
1926			Taranaki		0-19		
1926			Wanganui	15-11			
1926	H		North Auckland		0-8		
1926			Waikato		5-39		
1926	H		Hawkes Bay B		6-13		
1927	H		King Country			9-9	
1927			Bay of Plenty		3-6		
1927	H		Waikato		3-17		
1927	H		Auckland B	18-17			
1927		*	T.Valley/Wai/BOP/KC v Auck/NA			8-8	
1928			Auckland B		8-56		
1928	H		Taranaki		3-38		
1928			Waikato		0-25		
1929	H		Auckland B	17-12			
1929	H		Waikato		11-12		
1930			Waikato		0-30		
1930	H		Bay of Plenty		6-8		
1930			Bay of Plenty	7-6			
1931			King Country	3-0			
1931			Poverty Bay		3-23		
1931			East Coast		3-5		
1931			Bay of Plenty		5-18		
1931	H		Waikato		12-17		
1931	H		Auckland B		3-10		
1932	H		King Country		6-29		
1932			Waikato		12-22		
1932	H		NZ Maori XV		6-35		
1932	H		Bay of Plenty		8-17		
1932			Auckland B		3-24		
1933			King Country		11-19		
1933	H		Waikato		3-14		
1933			Bay of Plenty	12-8			
1933	H		Auckland B		6-8		
1933			North Auckland		15-36		
1934			Auckland B		14-16		
1934			Waikato		12-37		
1934	H		Poverty Bay		8-9		
1934	H		Taranaki B		9-14		
1934	H		Bay of Plenty		9-11		
1935	H		Waikato		3-30		
1935		*	T.Valley/Wai/KC v Auck/NA		16-18		
1935	H		Auckland B		14-32		
1935	H		King Country		16-22		
1935			Bay of Plenty		6-20		
1935	H		Hawkes Bay Colts XV		6-10		
1936			Auckland B		11-39		
1936	H		North Auckland	19-13			
1936			King Country		8-18		
1936			Waikato		3-30		
1936	H		Bay of Plenty		9-11		
1937	H		Waikato		9-19		
1937			Bay of Plenty		6-30		
1937			North Auckland		9-23		
1937	H		Auckland B	21-11			
1938			Waikato		0-26		
1938			King Country		14-32		
1938	H		King Country		0-23		
1938			Auckland Colts XV		11-24		
1939			King Country		3-9		
1939	H		Waikato		6-31		
1939	H		Taranaki Colts XV		8-27		
1939	H		Auckland Colts XV		11-29		
1940			Auckland Colts XV		9-14		
1940	H		Bay of Plenty		6-9		
1940			Waikato		8-29		
1941-44							
1945	H		Waikato		7-18		
1946	H		Auckland B		6-17		
1946			Waikato	17-0			
1947			Bay of Plenty		3-6		
1947	H		East Coast			0-0	
1947	H		NZ Maori		0-26		
1947	H		Waikato			3-3	
1947			Auckland XV		14-41		
1948	H		Auckland XV		19-21		
1948	H		Bay of Plenty			6-6	
1948			Waikato		3-22		
1948		*	T.Valley/Waikato v BOP/KC	17-0			Thames Valley-Waikato vs
1948			Auckland XV		0-18		
1949			Bay of Plenty		6-8		
1949	H		Auckland XV		6-13		
1949	H		Waikato	9-8			

=== 1950-59 ===
1950			Taranaki		0-19		
1950			King Country		6-8		
1950		*	T.Valley/KC/Waikato v British Isles		0-30		Thames Valley-King Country-Waikato vs
1950	H		Bay of Plenty	22-8			
1950			Waikato		13-14		
1950	H		Auckland XV		11-27		
1951	H		FIJI	16-6			T. Valley beats FIJI
1951	H		Waikato		3-11		
1951		RS	North Auckland		6-19		
1951	H		King Country	12-11			
1951	H		Taranaki		3-21		
1951			Auckland XV		9-20		
1951			Bay of Plenty		11-17		
1952			East Coast	17-6			
1952			Poverty Bay		6-16		
1952			Hawkes Bay		3-8		
1952		RS	Waikato		3-17		
1952	H		Wairarapa (Wairarapa-Bush)	13-3			
1952	H		North Auckland	17-12			
1952	H		Auckland XV	25-12			Beat Auckland XV
1952	H		Bay of Plenty		10-30		
1953			Waikato		8-29		
1953			North Auckland		8-9		
1953			Bay of Plenty		26-40		
1953	H		Poverty Bay	37-8			
1953	H		Otago		6-14		
1953	H		Hawkes Bay	19-16			
1953	H		Waikato	15-12			
1953			Auckland	12-3			Beat Auckland
1954			Wairarapa (Wairarapa-Bush)	11-3			
1954			Horowhenua	6-0			
1954			Manawatu	11-6			
1954			Bush (Wairarapa-Bush)	8-3			
1954	H		NSW Country			12-12	T. Valley played NSW Country
1954	H		Bush (Wairarapa-Bush)	23-8			
1954	H		Bay of Plenty	32-0			
1954	H		Auckland	25-17			Beat Auckland
1954	H		North Auckland			14-14	
1954			Auckland XV		9-13		
1954			Waikato		3-12		
1955	H		Horowhenua		17-19		
1955			South Auckland (Counties)		14-15		
1955	H		NZ Maori	17-14			
1955			Bay of Plenty	19-16			
1955	H	*	T.Valley/BOP v Australia		9-14		Thames Valley-Bay of Plenty vs
1955	H		Manawatu		14-20		
1955	H		East Coast	30-6			
1955			North Auckland		3-6		
1955	H		Waikato	13-11			
1955			Auckland XV	30-8			
1955	H		South Auckland (Counties)	17-11			
1955		RS	Canterbury		11-24		
1956			North Auckland		9-11		
1956	H	CS	Auckland		10-12		
1956		CS	Counties	3-0			
1956	H	CS	Bay of Plenty	20-9			
1956			King Country		15-18		
1956	H	CS	North Auckland		6-9		
1956	H	*	T.Valley/BOP/Count v Auckland		5-6		Thames Valley-Bay of Plenty-Counties vs
1956		*	T.Valley/BOP/Count v Waikato		6-24		Thames Valley-Bay of Plenty-Counties vs
1956		*	T.Valley/BOP/Count v South Africa		6-17		Thames Valley-Bay of Plenty-Counties vs
1956		CS	Waikato		6-30		
1956			East Coast	20-6			
1957		CS	Auckland	17-16			First and last time T.Valley held the Coronation Shield.
1957			Taranaki		6-10		
1957			Manawatu	12-3			
1957			Hawkes Bay		12-19		
1957			Poverty Bay	8-3			
1957		CS	Bay of Plenty		3-5		
1957	H		Poverty Bay	16-6			
1957	H	CS	Waikato			11-11	
1957	H		Counties	21-16			
1957			North Auckland	11-8			
1958	H		King Country	6-3			
1958	H		Auckland		8-16		
1958	H		Bush (Wairarapa-Bush)	19-11			
1958		CS	Waikato		8-20		
1958	H		NZ Combined Services	19-11			
1958	H		Wellington		9-17		
1958	H		Bay of Plenty	9-6			
1958	H		North Auckland	8-3			
1958			Counties			11-11	
1959			King Country	20-19			
1959			Wanganui		12-16		
1959			Bush (Wairarapa-Bush)		5-6		
1959			Wairarapa (Wairarapa-Bush)	16-12			
1959	H		East Coast		5-13		
1959			Auckland		3-16		
1959			Bay of Plenty		16-17		
1959	H	*	T.Valley/BOP v KC/Counties	16-11			Thames Valley-Bay of Plenty vs
1959		CS	North Auckland		12-22		
1959	H		Waikato		14-17		
1959		*	T.Valley/BOP v KC	19-17			Thames Valley-Bay of Plenty vs
1959	H		Auckland		6-31		
1959		*	T.Valley/BOP v British Isles		24-26		Thames Valley-Bay of Plenty vs
1959	H		Counties		12-16		

=== 1960-69 ===
1960			Waikato		6-9		
1960	H		King Country	11-3			
1960		RS	Auckland		6-22		
1960	H		Bay of Plenty	20-13			
1960			Counties		21-26		
1960	H		North Auckland		11-14		
1960	H		Manawatu	6-3			
1960	H		Taranaki		6-26		
1961	H		Counties		3-9		
1961	H		Auckland		3-21		
1961	H		King Country		9-25		
1961	H		Waikato		8-11		
1961	H		Hawkes Bay		3-8		
1961		CS	North Auckland		14-18		
1961			King Country		6-21		
1961			Bay of Plenty	15-8			
1962			King Country		8-16		
1962			Manawatu		9-17		
1962			Horowhenua	17-6			
1962			Waikato		9-25		
1962		RS, CS	Auckland		9-24		
1962	H		Bay of Plenty	12-8			
1962	H		North Auckland		3-6		
1962	H		King Country	9-3			
1962			Counties	13-6			
1962	H		AUSTRALIA	16-14			T. Valley beats AUSTRALIA
1963	H		King Country		3-16		
1963	H		Auckland		3-52		
1963			Bay of Plenty		3-12		
1963	H		Waikato		10-14		
1963	H		Counties	3-0			
1963			North Auckland	9-8			
1963	H		Manawatu		8-9		
1964	H		King Country	14-8			
1964	H		Bay of Plenty	13-8			
1964	H		Auckland		3-15		
1964	H	CS	North Auckland		11-17		
1964			Waikato		6-8		
1964			Counties		9-19		
1964			King Country	10-8			
1964			Otago			12-12	
1964			North Otago	17-9			
1964			Mid-Canterbury			11-11	
1964			Canterbury		6-22		
1964	H		Waikato XV	21-14			
1965			King Country		3-16		
1965	H		King Country		11-14		
1965	H		Horowhenua	18-5			
1965	H		Waikato		0-12		
1965	H		Counties	11-0			
1965			Bay of Plenty		6-42		
1965	H		Auckland		0-13		
1965		*	T.Valley/BOP/Count v KC		8-9		Thames Valley-Bay of Plenty-Counties vs
1965	H	*	T.Valley/BOP/Count v NZ Services		13-14		Thames Valley-Bay of Plenty-Counties vs
1965		*	T.Valley/BOP/Count v SOUTH AFRICA		17-33		Thames Valley-Bay of Plenty-Counties vs
1965		CS	North Auckland		9-11		
1966			Waikato		14-16		
1966	H	CS	North Auckland		8-12		
1966			King Country		9-20		
1966	H		Auckland		9-17		
1966	H		King Country		8-16		
1966	H		Mid-Canterbury	28-11			
1966			Counties		6-15		
1966	H		Canterbury		14-25		
1966	H		North Otago	19-14			
1966	H	*	T.Valley/Count v BOP	5-3			Thames Valley-Counties vs
1966		*	T.Valley/Count v N.Auck		14-16		Thames Valley-Counties vs
1966		*	T.Valley/Count v BRITISH ISLES		9-13		Thames Valley-Counties vs
1966			Poverty Bay		3-22		
1966			East Coast	16-14			
1966	H		Bay of Plenty		14-31		
1967			Waikato		3-18		
1967	H	CS	King Country		3-11		
1967	H		Poverty Bay		6-12		
1967	H		NSW Country	15-11			T. Valley played NSW Country
1967			North Auckland		0-14		
1967			Bay of Plenty		17-33		
1967	H		Waikato		6-22		
1967			King Country			11-11	
1967	H		NZ Services		9-13		
1967	H		Counties			0-0	
1967		CS	Auckland		5-38		
1968	H		Bay of Plenty		3-6		
1968	H	CS	Auckland		3-6		
1968	H	CS	North Auckland		3-18		
1968			King Country		0-19		
1968			Waikato	15-14			
1968	H		King Country		3-11		
1968			Counties		17-35		
1968	H		NZ Services	32-13			
1969	H		Poverty Bay		9-11		
1969			Horowhenua		0-15		
1969			Wairarapa (Wairarapa-Bush)		16-17		
1969			Bush (Wairarapa-Bush)		18-23		
1969			Manawatu	18-17			
1969			Bay of Plenty		8-19		
1969	H		King Country	11-8			
1969		CS	North Auckland		0-24		
1969	H		Counties		8-27		
1969	H		Waikato		0-22		
1969	H		Auckland		6-24		
1969			Counties		11-25		
1969	H		TONGA	12-10			

=== 1970-79 ===
1970	H		NSW	13-12			
1970	H		East Coast	25-6			
1970	H		Counties		8-40		
1970			King Country		6-35		
1970	H		Bay of Plenty		3-24		
1970	H		Auckland		6-12		
1970		CS	Waikato		19-26		
1970			Counties		12-45		
1970	H		North Auckland		3-20		
1971	H		Counties	6-0			
1971		*	T.Valley/Count v BRITISH ISLES		3-25		Thames Valley-Counties vs
1971			Bay of Plenty		11-16		
1971	H		King Country		6-19		
1971	H		Auckland		12-37		
1971			North Auckland		0-44		
1971	H		Waikato		8-16		
1971	H		Combined Services	22-14			
1971		CS	Counties		12-52		
1971			Taranaki		3-48		
1972			Waikato		9-38		
1972	H	CS	North Auckland		12-27		
1972			Bay of Plenty		9-35		
1972			East Coast			10-10	
1972			Poverty Bay		12-32		
1972	H		Counties		6-19		
1972			King Country		12-24		
1972	H		Waikato		17-20		
1972	H		Auckland		0-46		
1972	H		King Country	21-16			
1973			King Country		10-15		
1973			Horowhenua	31-6			
1973			Wanganui		12-15		
1973	H		Auckland		12-17		
1973	H		NZ Juniors		12-29		
1973			Counties		10-29		
1973	H		Waikato	9-6			
1973	H		Poverty Bay	7-6			
1973	H		Bay of Plenty		3-11		
1973			North Auckland		6-36		
1973	H		NZ Combined Services	22-21			
1974	H		East Coast	27-12			
1974		CS	Bay of Plenty		9-33		
1974			Poverty Bay		13-17		
1974			East Coast		0-16		
1974	H		NZ Colts		10-25		
1974	H		King Country		4-12		
1974	H	CS	Auckland		3-6		
1974	H		Auckland XV		8-16		
1974	H		North Auckland		6-9		
1974			Waikato		0-43		
1974	H	CS	Counties		9-26		
1975	H		Waikato		6-28		
1975	H		Bay of Plenty	10-8			
1975			King Country	23-15			
1975			North Auckland		9-20		
1975	H		TONGA		16-41		
1975		RS	Auckland		0-22		
1975		CS	Counties		18-52		
1975	H		Horowhenua		13-23		
1975	H		Poverty Bay		13-35		
1976	H		North Auckland		3-29		
1976	H		COOK ISLANDS	20-10			
1976		N2, CS	Waikato		3-23		
1976			Bay of Plenty		3-33		
1976	H	N2	East Coast		4-12		
1976			Mid-Canterbury	14-12			
1976			South Canterbury		7-17		
1976			North Otago	20-12			
1976	H	N2	King Country			9-9	
1976	H		NZ Colts			3-3	
1976		N2	Horowhenua	16-11			
1976		N2	Wairarapa-Bush		11-20		
1976		N2	Poverty Bay		6-13		
1976	H	N2	Wanganui		12-20		
1976	H		Auckland XV		15-18		
1976	H	N2	Taranaki		9-20		NPC - 2nd Division North, 8th
1977		N2	King Country		6-10		
1977		N2	North Auckland		0-42		
1977			Counties	15-13			
1977	H	N2	Horowhenua	16-4			
1977		*	T.Valley/Count v BRITISH ISLES		10-35		Thames Valley-Counties vs
1977	H	N2	Wairarapa-Bush	22-12			
1977		N2	East Coast			10-10	
1977	H	N2	Waikato		9-19		
1977	H	N2	Poverty Bay		11-21		
1977		N2	Wanganui		25-40		NPC - 2nd Division North, 7th
1977	H		NSW Country		13-25		
1978	H		North Auckland	22-13			
1978			Counties		11-41		
1978	H		Irish Universities		0-13		
1978		N2	King Country	25-23			
1978		N2	Wanganui		7-17		
1978	H	N2	Bay of Plenty		11-22		
1978		N2, CS	Waikato		0-45		
1978		N2	Poverty Bay	20-17			
1978	H	N2	Horowhenua		0-22		
1978	H	N2	East Coast			9-9	
1978	H	N2	Wairarapa-Bush	16-12			NPC - 2nd Division North, 6th
1978	H	CS	Waikato		16-29		
1979	H		Counties		15-21		
1979		CS	Bay of Plenty		6-29		
1979	H	N2	King Country	6-4			
1979	H		NZ Juniors		0-11		
1979		RS	North Auckland		3-35		
1979		N2	Hawkes Bay		3-33		
1979		N2	Horowhenua		12-13		
1979		N2	Wairarapa-Bush	12-7			
1979	H	N2	Waikato		9-21		
1979	H	N2	Wanganui		0-31		
1979		N2	East Coast		6-12		
1979	H	N2	Poverty Bay	15-9			NPC - 2nd Division North, 6th

=== 1980-89 ===
1980	H		Sydney		10-38		
1980		CS	Counties		0-35		
1980	H		North Auckland		0-29		
1980	H		NZ Colts		13-29		
1980	H		Queensland		12-16		
1980		N2	East Coast	19-7			
1980		N2	Poverty Bay		3-21		
1980	H	N2	Horowhenua	23-13			
1980	H	N2	Wairarapa-Bush		3-17		
1980		N2	King Country	12-4			
1980		N2	Wanganui		6-20		
1980		N2-RS	Waikato		7-16		
1980	H	N2	Taranaki		7-24		NPC - 2nd Division North, 6th
1981			North Coast	33-3			Not 1st class
1981			Hunter Valley	21-4			Not 1st class
1981			Central Coast		8-12		Not 1st class
1981			NSW Country Selection		6-15		Not 1st class
1981	H		Counties		6-38		
1981	H		Waikato		0-50		
1981			North Auckland		3-68		
1981	H		Cote de Basque		17-28		
1981	H		Australian Colts		16-20		
1981	H	N2	King Country		13-16		
1981	H	N2	East Coast	21-9			
1981		N2	Taranaki		0-63		
1981		N2	Wairarapa-Bush		6-32		
1981		N2	Horowhenua		12-19		
1981	H	N2	Poverty Bay	17-13			
1981	H		NZ Combined Services		6-26		
1981	H	N2	Wanganui		12-28		NPC - 2nd Division North, 7th
1981	H		Suva		12-26		
1982	H		North Auckland		3-15		
1982	H		Bay of Plenty	12-0			
1982		N2	Wanganui		6-13		
1982		N2	King Country		3-7		
1982	H	N2	Taranaki		13-25		
1982	H		Auckland XV		15-33		
1982	H	N2	Horowhenua	9-0			
1982		CS	Counties		7-41		
1982			Waikato		7-56		
1982		N2	East Coast	21-4			
1982		N2	Poverty Bay	24-12			NPC - 2nd Division North, 4th
1983	H		Counties		0-24		
1983			North Auckland		9-40		
1983	H	N2	East Coast	26-9			
1983	H		Waikato		7-27		
1983	H	N2	King Country		10-17		
1983	H	N2	Wanganui		13-23		
1983		N2	Horowhenua	38-15			
1983		N2	Taranaki		9-51		
1983	H	N2	Poverty Bay		0-6		NPC - 2nd Division North, 5th
1984			West Coast	18-16			
1984			Buller			10-10	
1984			Marlborough		18-29		
1984	H		Victoria	15-7			
1984	H		North Auckland		6-14		
1984	H		Southland	21-16			
1984	H		Central Queensland	22-0			
1984			Bay of Plenty		18-23		
1984		CS	Waikato		6-50		Coronation Shield
1984	H	N2	Horowhenua	28-8			
1984		N2	Wanganui		15-32		
1984		N2	King Country		4-45		
1984	H	N2	Taranaki		4-43		
1984		N2	East Coast	18-6			
1984		N2	Poverty Bay	32-6			NPC - 2nd Division North, 4th
1985			Counties		4-48		
1985			North Auckland		6-41		
1985	H		Bay of Plenty	10-9			
1985	H		King Country		6-27		
1985	H		Waikato B		9-13		
1985	H		Auckland B		10-39		
1985		N3	North Harbour		3-39		
1985	H	N3	East Coast	43-13			
1985	H	N3	Poverty Bay		7-19		NPC - 3rd Division North, 3rd
1986	H		North Auckland		7-55		
1986			King Country		7-20		
1986	H		Counties		6-18		
1986	H		Waikato		8-22		
1986		RS, CS	Auckland		0-97		Ranfurly Shield, Coronation Shield
1986			Bay of Plenty		9-42		
1986	H	N3	North Otago	18-9			
1986	H	N3	South Canterbury		8-13		
1986		N3	East Coast		3-9		
1986		N3	Poverty Bay		14-27		
1986	H	N3	Horowhenua	23-15			
1986	H		AUSTRALIA		7-31		
1986		N3	West Coast		9-10		
1986		N3	Nelson Bays	13-12			NPC - 3rd Division, 4th
1987	H	N3	Nelson Bays	15-12			
1987	H		King Country		15-41		
1987	H		Bay of Plenty		15-49		
1987		N3	North Otago	13-10			
1987		N3	Buller	25-10			
1987	H	N3	East Coast	15-6			
1987		N3	Horowhenua		6-9		
1987			Waikato B		9-41		
1987			Counties		16-27		
1987	H	N3	West Coast	30-9			
1987	H	N3	Poverty Bay		10-38		NPC - 3rd Division, 3rd
1988	H		NSW Country		13-18		
1988			King Country		9-10		
1988	H		North Harbour		10-21		
1988	H		Counties	25-7			
1988		N3	West Coast	60-0			
1988		N3	Nelson Bays	28-12			
1988		N3	Wanganui	31-12			
1988		N3	East Coast	56-0			
1988	H	N3	Buller	25-3			
1988	H	N3	North Otago	46-6			
1988	H	N3	Horowhenua	38-9			NPC - 3rd Division, Won it!!!
1989			Bay of Plenty		12-29		
1989			Waikato		0-72		
1989			Counties		12-30		
1989	H	N2	Southland		6-17		
1989	H		NZ Colts		4-25		
1989		RS, CS	Auckland		7-58		Ranfurly Shield, Coronation Shield
1989	H	N2	Wairarapa-Bush		6-13		
1989		N2	Mid-Canterbury			12-12	
1989		N2	Marlborough		10-14		
1989		N2	Manawatu		6-23		
1989	H		NZ Combined Services	20-13			
1989		N2	Poverty Bay		7-26		
1989	H	N2	King Country		16-18		NPC - 2nd Division, Wooden Spoon

=== 1990-99 ===
1990	H	N3	West Coast	35-0			
1990	H		Counties		12-24		
1990		N3	Buller	37-12			
1990		N3	North Otago	33-3			
1990		N3	Horowhenua	22-0			
1990		N3	East Coast	42-4			
1990			King Country		12-14		
1990	H	N3	South Canterbury	35-18			
1990	H	N3	Nelson Bays	43-3			NPC - 3rd Division, Won it!!!
1991	H		NZ Combined Services		9-41		
1991	H		ROMANIA		17-20		
1991			Counties		12-51		
1991		N2	Southland		12-28		
1991		N2	Marlborough	23-15			
1991		N2	King Country		0-40		
1991	H	N2	Wairarapa-Bush	8-6			
1991	H	N2	Wanganui	38-13			
1991	H	N2	Poverty Bay		23-24		
1991	H	N2	Manawatu	19-15			NPC - 2nd Division, 4th
1992	H		NZ Divisional XV		6-30		
1992			Hawkes Bay		6-54		
1992		N2	Manawatu		25-35		
1992	H		TONGA		3-5		
1992			North Auckland		19-66		
1992	H	N2	Counties		14-31		
1992	H	N2	Southland		6-52		
1992	H	N2	South Canterbury		25-31		
1992		N2	Taranaki		12-31		
1992		N2	Wairarapa-Bush		22-36		
1992		N2	Poverty Bay		16-25		
1992	H	N2	Bay of Plenty		13-33		NPC - 2nd Division, Wooden Spoon
1993			Counties		3-86		
1993	H		North Auckland		16-36		
1993			Bay of Plenty		17-76		
1993	H		Poverty Bay	21-17			
1993	H		NZ Colts		12-64		
1993	H		King Country		22-41		
1993		N3	North Otago	37-27			
1993		N3	Buller		9-23		
1993		N3	West Coast	40-17			
1993	H	N3	Marlborough	36-21			
1993	H	N3	East Coast	49-5			
1993	H	N3	Mid-Canterbury	17-14			
1993		N3	Horowhenua		12-21		
1993	H	N3	Wanganui		11-13		NPC - 3rd Division, 4th
1993		N3-SF	Wanganui		14-30		NPC - 3rd Division, Semi-Finals
1994	H		Natal		28-46		
1994			King Country		20-37		
1994	H		FIJI		16-35		
1994		RS	Waikato		3-74		
1994	H		Manawatu		17-21		
1994			Northland		3-71		
1994	H	N3	West Coast	74-5			
1994		N3	East Coast	48-8			
1994	H	N3	Poverty Bay	33-7			
1994		N3	Wanganui		15-20		
1994	H	N3	North Otago	68-7			
1994		N3	Marlborough	34-19			
1994	H	N3	Buller	46-3			
1994		N3	Mid-Canterbury	20-15			NPC - 3rd Division, 2nd
1994		N3-SF	Poverty Bay		20-40		NPC - 3rd Division, Semi-Finals
1995	H		COOK ISLANDS	45-15			
1995	H	CS	Waikato		15-51		Coronation Shield
1995	H	CS	North Harbour		6-29		Coronation Shield
1995	H	CS	Northland		3-57		Coronation Shield
1995		CS	Bay of Plenty		3-82		Coronation Shield
1995			NZ Universities		5-17		
1995		N3	North Otago	44-17			
1995	H	N3	Wanganui		6-17		
1995		N3	Buller	35-19			
1995	H	N3	East Coast	57-31			
1995	H	N3	Marlborough	45-33			
1995		N3	Poverty Bay	33-25			
1995	H	N3	Horowhenua	26-22			
1995		N3	West Coast	60-5			NPC - 3rd Division, 1st
1995	H	N3-SF	Horowhenua	32-17			NPC - 3rd Division, Semi-Finals
1995	H	N3-F	Poverty Bay	47-8			NPC - 3rd Division, Final - Won it!!!
1996	H		North Harbour		31-34		
1996			Counties		11-67		
1996	H		NSW Country		11-32		
1996	H		King Country		24-56		
1996			Waikato		0-66		
1996	H		Counties		8-92		
1996		N2	Bay of Plenty		15-53		
1996	H	N2	Northland		0-33		
1996	H	N2	Manawatu		15-24		
1996		N2	Southland		15-47		
1996	H	N2	Hawkes Bay		12-28		
1996	H	N2	Nelson Bays			23-23	
1996		N2	South Canterbury	25-24			
1996		N2	Wairarapa-Bush	27-24			NPC - 2nd Division, 8th
1997	H		Ireland A		12-38		
1997	H		Counties		12-64		
1997			East Coast		33-38		
1997			Poverty Bay	54-27			
1997		N2	Central Vikings		0-72		
1997		N2	Wairarapa-Bush		6-43		
1997	H	N2	Bay of Plenty		13-41		
1997	H	N2	South Canterbury	24-16			
1997		N2	Nelson Bays		23-25		
1997	H	N2	Wanganui		5-17		
1997	H	N2	King Country		17-44		
1997		N2	Northland		14-113		NPC - 2nd Division, 8th
1998	H		TONGA		10-24		
1998			Poverty Bay	64-9			
1998	H		Counties		6-29		
1998	H	N2	Wanganui	20-16			
1998		N2	Bay of Plenty		14-21		
1998	H	N2	Central Vikings		5-52		
1998		N2	Wanganui		10-34		
1998		N2	King Country	22-14			
1998	H	N2	Nelson Bays	24-20			
1998		N2	Marlborough		27-29		
1998	H	N2	Wairarapa-Bush	28-17			NPC - 2nd Division, 5th
1999		RS	Waikato		8-37		Ranfurly Shield
1999			East Coast	34-15			
1999			Poverty Bay		12-41		
1999		N2	Manawatu		15-17		
1999		N2	Hawkes Bay	36-34			
1999	H	N2	Wanganui		13-35		
1999	H	N2	King Country	28-20			
1999		N2	Nelson Bays		19-35		
1999	H	N2	Marlborough	47-20			
1999		N2	Mid-Canterbury		8-42		
1999	H	N2	Bay of Plenty		19-25		NPC - 2nd Division, 6th

=== 2000-05 ===
2000			Counties		18-55		
2000	H		East Coast	45-18			
2000	H		Poverty Bay	37-14			
2000	H	N2	Manawatu		15-23		
2000		N2	Wanganui		17-26		
2000		N2	Bay of Plenty		21-30		
2000	H	N2	Mid-Canterbury	27-17			
2000		N2	Marlborough		21-22		
2000	H	N2	Nelson Bays		3-44		
2000	H	N2	Hawkes Bay		8-12		
2000		N2	King Country		33-42		NPC - 2nd Division, 8th
2001	H		ARGENTINA		12-26		
2001	H	N2	King Country	16-14			
2001			Poverty Bay	22-20			
2001		N2	Manawatu		3-27		
2001	H	N2	East Coast		12-29		
2001		N2	Hawkes Bay		22-51		
2001		N2	Mid-Canterbury			19-19	
2001	H	N2	Marlborough	46-36			
2001	H	N2	Wanganui	30-8			
2001		N2	Nelson Bays		7-16		NPC - 2nd Division, 6th
2002			Bay of Plenty		3-57		
2002	H	N2	Poverty Bay	22-17			
2002	H	N2	East Coast		15-19		
2002		N2	Hawkes Bay		10-59		
2002	H	N2	Counties		15-66		
2002		N2	Mid-Canterbury		16-17		
2002		N2	Manawatu		7-39		
2002		N2	Nelson Bays		18-49		
2002	H	N2	Marlborough		22-50		NPC - 2nd Division, Wooden Spoon
2003	H		King Country	52-12			
2003	H	N2	Mid-Canterbury	35-7			
2003		N2	North Otago		18-40		
2003	H	N2	Hawkes Bay		13-19		
2003		N2	East Coast	12-6			
2003		N2	Counties		23-57		
2003		N2	Marlborough		24-25		
2003	H	N2	Nelson Bays		9-19		
2003	H	N2	Manawatu		12-13		NPC - 2nd Division, 7th
2004			King Country	13-11			
2004	H	N2	North Otago		5-62		
2004		N2	Nelson Bays		10-71		
2004		N2	Hawkes Bay		0-88		
2004	H	N2	East Coast		7-56		
2004		N2	Manawatu		5-47		
2004	H	N2	Marlborough		21-56		
2004		N2	Wanganui		10-62		
2004	H	N2	Counties		14-68		NPC - 2nd Division, Wooden Spoon
2005			Counties		9-97		
2005		N3	Mid-Canterbury		16-30		
2005	H	N3	Buller		12-29		
2005		N3	Horowhenua		10-40		
2005	H	N3	King Country		17-19		
2005		N3	Wairarapa-Bush		11-38		
2005		N3	South Canterbury	40-11			
2005	H	N3	West Coast	25-18			NPC - 3rd Division, 6th

=== Result summaries by year ===
Year	Played	Won	Lost	Draw	For	Ag
1922	3	0	3	0	9	44
1923	3	1	2	0	31	45
1924	1	1	0	0	21	6
1925	3	2	1	0	36	32
1926	7	2	5	0	38	124
1927	4	1	2	1	33	49
1928	3	0	3	0	11	119
1929	2	1	1	0	29	24
1930	3	1	2	0	13	44
1931	6	1	5	0	29	73
1932	5	0	5	0	35	127
1933	5	1	4	0	40	85
1934	5	0	5	0	52	87
1935	5	0	5	0	45	114
1936	5	1	4	0	50	81
1937	4	1	3	0	45	83
1938	4	0	4	0	25	105
1939	4	0	4	0	28	96
1940	3	0	3	0	23	52
1945	1	0	1	0	7	18
1946	2	1	1	0	23	17
1947	5	0	2	3	20	76
1948	4	0	3	1	28	67
1949	3	1	2	0	21	29
1950	5	1	4	0	52	76
1951	7	2	5	0	60	105
1952	8	4	4	0	94	104
1953	8	4	4	0	131	131
1954	11	7	2	2	154	88
1955	11	6	5	0	185	150
1956	8	3	5	0	89	95
1957	10	6	3	1	117	97
1958	9	5	3	1	97	98
1959	11	2	9	0	121	185
1960	8	3	5	0	87	116
1961	8	1	7	0	61	121
1962	10	5	5	0	105	125
1963	7	2	5	0	39	111
1964	10	5	5	2	133	151
1965	8	2	6	0	58	113
1966	12	3	9	0	148	213
1967	11	1	8	2	75	183
1968	8	2	6	0	76	122
1969	13	3	10	0	117	242
1970	9	2	7	0	95	220
1971	9	2	7	0	80	246
1972	10	1	8	1	108	267
1973	11	4	7	0	134	191
1974	11	1	10	0	92	215
1975	9	2	7	0	108	244
1976	16	4	10	2	155	262
1977	10	3	6	1	127	196
1978	12	4	7	1	137	263
1979	12	3	9	0	87	226
1980	13	3	10	0	115	269
1981	14	2	12	0	141	438
1982	11	4	7	0	120	206
1983	9	2	7	0	112	212
1984	15	7	7	1	235	305
1985	9	2	7	0	98	248
1986	14	3	11	0	132	380
1987	11	4	7	0	166	255
1988	11	9	2	0	342	97
1989	13	1	11	1	118	350
1990	9	7	2	0	271	79
1991	10	4	6	0	161	253
1992	12	0	12	0	167	429
1993	15	6	9	0	316	491
1994	15	7	8	0	453	408
1995	16	10	6	0	462	465
1996	14	2	11	1	217	604
1997	12	2	10	0	213	538
1998	11	5	6	0	230	265
1999	11	4	7	0	239	321
2000	11	3	8	0	245	303
2001	10	4	5	1	189	246
2002	9	1	8	0	128	373
2003	9	3	6	0	198	198
2004	9	1	8	0	85	521
2005	8	2	6	0	140	282

== Super Rugby ==
Thames Valley along with Waikato, Counties Manukau, Bay of Plenty, East Coast, Taranaki and King Country now make up the Chiefs Super Rugby franchise. When Super Rugby initially started they were part of the Blues.
