= Nelson Bays Rugby Union =

Defunct NZ rugby union club, based in Nelson Bays

Nelson Bays

Club information
- Full name: Nelson Bays Rugby Union
- Colours: Blue
- Founded: 1968
- Exited: 2005; 21 years ago
- Website: http://www.tasmanmakos.co.nz

Former details
- Competition: NPC

Nelson Bays Rugby Union was a New Zealand rugby union team that played from 1968 to 2005.

Nelson Bays was founded in 1968 when Nelson merged with Golden Bay-Motueka and played until 2005 when they joined with Marlborough to become Tasman Rugby Union in 2006.

== Achievements ==
Year	Achievement
1992	NPC Division 3 Champions
1999	NPC Division 2 Champions
2004	NPC Division 2 Champions

== Ranfurly Shield ==
Nelson Bays challenged for the Ranfurly Shield 6 times but were never successful.

== All Blacks ==
Nelson Bays had two All Blacks in their existence, Trevor James Morris and Rico Gear. Morris managed 20 games as an All Black, including three test matches, between 1972 and 1973.
