= Southland (National Provincial Championship) =

NZ rugby union club, based in Invercargill

- Official emblem
- Union: Rugby Southland
- Nickname: Stags
- Founded: 1887; 139 years ago
- Location: Georgetown, Invercargill, New Zealand
- Ground: Rugby Park Stadium (Capacity: 18,000)
- CEO: Hua Tamariki
- Coach: Scott Eade
- Captain: Sean Withy
- Most appearances: Jason Rutledge (143)
- Top scorer: Simon Culhane (980)
- Most tries: Bruce Pascoe (46)
- League: National Provincial Championship
- 2025: 13th
Team kit

Official website
- www.rugbysouthland.co.nz

Southland (often known as the Southland Stags) are a New Zealand professional rugby union team based in Invercargill, New Zealand. The union was originally established in 1887, with the National Provincial Championship established in 1976. They now play in the reformed National Provincial Championship competition. They play their home games at Rugby Park Stadium in Invercargill in the Southland region. The team is affiliated with the Highlanders Super Rugby franchise. Their home playing colours are maroon and gold.

== Current squad ==
The Southland Stags squad for the 2026 Hilux NPC season is:

2026 Southland squad
**Props**: (Australia) Jack Barrett; (New Zealand) Sef Fa'agase; (New Zealand) Hunter Fahey (injured); (New Zealand) Darius Fidow ^{WTG}; (New Zealand) JJ Fisher ^{WTG}; (New Zealand) **Ethan de Groot**; (Australia) Ollie Harris ^{WTG}; (Tonga) **Paula Latu**; (New Zealand) Liam McIntosh ^{WTG}; (New Zealand) Jack Sexton; (New Zealand) Brian Tyrell ^{WTG}; **Hookers**: (New Zealand) Liam Ferguson ^{WTG}; (New Zealand) Jayden Henderson ^{ST} (Note: Henderson wasn't named in the original Southland squad, but was announced in the side for Round 1.); (New Zealand) Shaun Kempton; (New Zealand) Aukusitino Salanoa; (New Zealand) Jack Taylor; **Locks**: (New Zealand) Alefosio Aho; (New Zealand) Kasaloma Ahokovi ^{ST} (Note: Ahokovi wasn't named in the original Southland squad, but was announced in the side for Round 1.); (New Zealand) Luka Cassidy ^{WTG}; (New Zealand) Mitchell Dunshea; (Australia) Clem Halaholo; (New Zealand) Woody Kirkwood ^{WTG}; (New Zealand) Lachlan Stevens ^{WTG}; (New Zealand) Alex Yallop (injured)	**Loose forwards**: (New Zealand) Sam Fischli; (New Zealand) Caleb Karangaroa; (New Zealand) Sloane Lankshear ^{WTG}; (New Zealand) Louis Lepionka ^{WTG}; (New Zealand) Gregor Rutledge; (New Zealand) Konrad Toleafoa; (New Zealand) Semisi Tupou Ta'eiloa; (New Zealand) Sean Withy **(c)**; **Halfbacks (scrum-halves)**: (New Zealand) Jackson Hughan; (New Zealand) Charlie Marsh; (New Zealand) Koen Rarere ^{WTG}; (New Zealand) Nic Shearer; **First five-eighths (fly-halves)**: (New Zealand) Josh Jennings ^{WTG}; (New Zealand) Mika Muliaina; (Japan) Takaya Saito; (New Zealand) Jimmy Taylor	**Midfielders (centres)**: (New Zealand) Scott Gregory; (New Zealand) Will Gualter ^{ST} (Note: Gualter wasn't named in the original Southland squad, but was announced in the side for Round 3.); (New Zealand) Tayne Harvey; (New Zealand) Fletcher Morgan; (New Zealand) Sam Mustchin ^{WTG}; (Japan) Hayata Taniyama; **Outside backs**: (New Zealand) Josh Augustine; (New Zealand) Michael Manson; (New Zealand) Alfred Nonu ^{ST} (Note: Nonu wasn't named in the original Southland squad, but was announced in the side for Round 2.); (New Zealand) Jay Reihana ^{WTG}; (New Zealand) Denzel Samoa; (New Zealand) Justin Shaw ^{WTG}; (Australia) Tiam Toufan ^{WTG}; (Australia) Glen Vaihu
**(c)** denotes the team captain. **Bold** denotes internationally capped players.^{ST} denotes a short-term signing.^{WTG} denotes a wider training group member. denotes an injured player. Source:

== Honours ==
Southland have never been overall Champions. Their full list of honours, though, include:

National Provincial Championship Second Division South Island

- Winners: 1982, 1984

National Provincial Championship Second Division

- Winners: 1989, 1994, 1996

== Current Super Rugby players ==
Players named in the 2025 Southland Stags squad, who also earned contracts or were named in a squad for any side participating in the 2025 Super Rugby Pacific season.

Player	Team
Ale Aho	Waratahs
Ethan de Groot	Highlanders
Mitchell Dunshea	Highlanders
Michael Manson	Highlanders
Hayden Michaels	Highlanders
Sevu Reece	Crusaders
Nic Souchon	Hurricanes
Jack Taylor	Highlanders
Semisi Tupou Ta'eiloa	Moana Pasifika
Sean Withy	Highlanders
