= Marlborough Rugby Union =

Defunct NZ rugby union club, based in Blenheim

(New Zealand) Marlborough
- Full name: Marlborough Rugby Union
- Nickname: The Red Devils
- Founded: 1888; 138 years ago
- Disbanded: 2005; 21 years ago
- Ground: Lansdowne Park
- League: NPC

Marlborough Rugby Union was a New Zealand rugby union team that played from 1888 until 2005 when they merged with the neighbouring Nelson Bays Rugby Union to become the Tasman Rugby Union.

Marlborough was founded in 1888 and played at Lansdowne Park in Blenheim.

== Championships ==
Marlborough won three New Zealand Championships during the old NPC, consecutive South Island Division with two titles in 1978 and 1979, and Division 3 in 1997.

== Ranfurly Shield ==
=== 1973/74 Ranfurly Shield reign ===
Marlborough won the Ranfurly Shield in 1973, taking it from Canterbury. They managed six defences before losing to South Canterbury, in the second challenge of 1974.

28 July 1973	Canterbury	6-13	Marlborough

11 August 1973	Marlborough	36-0	Wairarapa Bush

1 September 1973	Marlborough	26-9	North Otago

8 September 1973	Marlborough	30-6	Wanganui

22 September 1973	Marlborough	29-9	Nelson Bays

29 September 1973	Marlborough	36-9	Mid Canterbury

27 July 1974	Marlborough	18-0	West Coast

17 August 1974	Marlborough	6-18	South Canterbury

=== Other Ranfurly Shield challenges ===
Marlborough's last Ranfurly Shield challenge was in the 2005 season, however Marlborough could not match Canterbury's strength this time and lost heavily, 3–67.

== Hong Kong Sevens ==
Marlborough reached the final of the 1977 Hong Kong Sevens, finishing runner-up, losing 18–28 to Fiji.

== Merger ==
Marlborough and Nelson Bays Rugby Union commenced playing as a merged team in the Tasman Rugby Union in the 2006 Air New Zealand Cup.
