= Rugby union numbering schemes =

System of numbering for rugby union

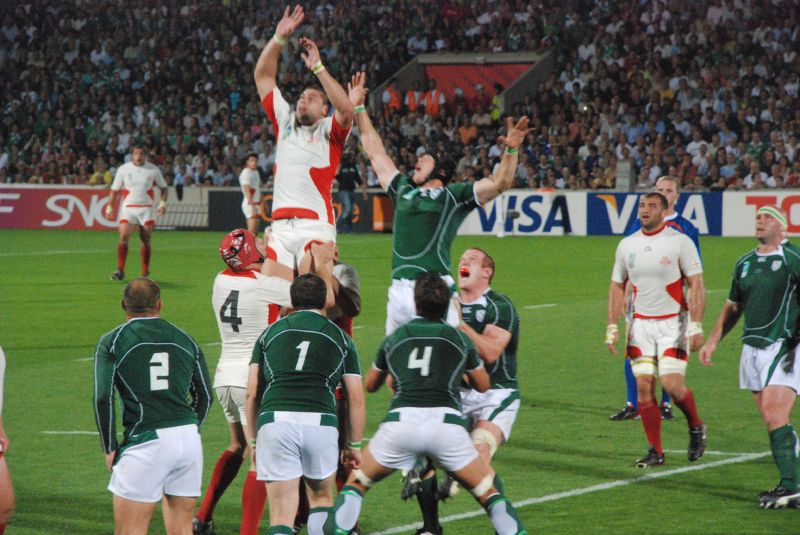
Ireland and Georgia contesting a line-out in the 2007 Rugby World Cup – several numbers on the Irish forwards can be clearly seen.

The standard modern rugby union numbering schemes have the starting players numbered from 1 to 15, and the replacements numbered 16 onwards. Rugby union players have not always been identified by individual labels, nor have the systems used always been the same.

== History of the use of numbers on shirts ==
During the first British Lions tour of Australasia in 1888 in a game on 20 September against Canterbury Rugby Union in Christchurch, each member of the visiting fifteen was made wear a differently coloured arm-band ribbon, necessitating the spectators to buy a game-day programme to identify each Lion.

The earliest recorded use of numbered jerseys for rugby union teams was on 8 September 1894 in a match at Lancaster Park at Christchurch in New Zealand between provincial sides Taranaki and Canterbury. A reference card was issued to spectators to identify by name each player. The custom was adopted for use in Australian rugby union in 1897 when the visiting New Zealand (now All Blacks) team played in Sydney against NSW (now Waratahs) and against Queensland (now Reds) in Brisbane. In Sydney both teams had numbers 1 to 15, whereas in Brisbane the players were individually numbered from 1 to 30. The 1899 British Lions tourists and Australia (now Wallabies) wore jerseys with numbers on their backs in their international contests in Sydney and Brisbane.

The practice of numbering jerseys was adopted for various major internationals, but no definitive system was adopted. The matter was brought before the International Rugby Board by the English and Welsh Rugby Unions in 1921, but it was decided that the identification of players by marking their shirts was a matter to be determined by the team themselves. Most teams used numbers, but in the 1930s, the Welsh used letters. In the early days, a "back row" was truly a back row, with all three players packing down with their shoulders driving the second row (rather than with the flankers driving the props directly as is usual today). Therefore, in many numbering systems these three players were numbered to reflect that (rather than with the two flankers having consecutive numbers as it is today).

In a likely apocryphal story, it has long been held that during a 1920s England vs Scotland match, King George V asked why the Scottish team were not wearing jersey numbers like their counterparts. The purported reply from Scottish rugby official James Aikman Smith was, "This, Sir, is a rugby match, not a cattle sale," or “They are rugby players, Your Majesty, not a herd of cattle.”

By the 1950s, the Rugby Football Union had produced a booklet called Know the Game, in which it is stated that "there are no hard and fast rules governing the names of the positions or the numbers worn", but it lists the custom in Britain as being 1 for the fullback, to 15 for the lock (now known as the number 8). Rugby league still uses this "correct" numbering system.

A number of different systems are used to publish team lists in newspapers, match programmes and online. In most of the world, players are listed in numerical order, either 1–15 or 15–1. Another common system is to list the backs 15–9, followed by the forwards 1–8, although traditionalists prefer 15–9, 1–5, 6,8,7, i.e. the forwards in scrum order.

By 1950, all the home nations used numbers; England, Scotland and Wales used the system described above, while France and Ireland did the reverse, using what would now be described as the modern system. By the 1960–61 season, however, they had all agreed to use the France/Ireland system, with 1 being loosehead prop and 15 being the fullback.

== Modern numbering ==
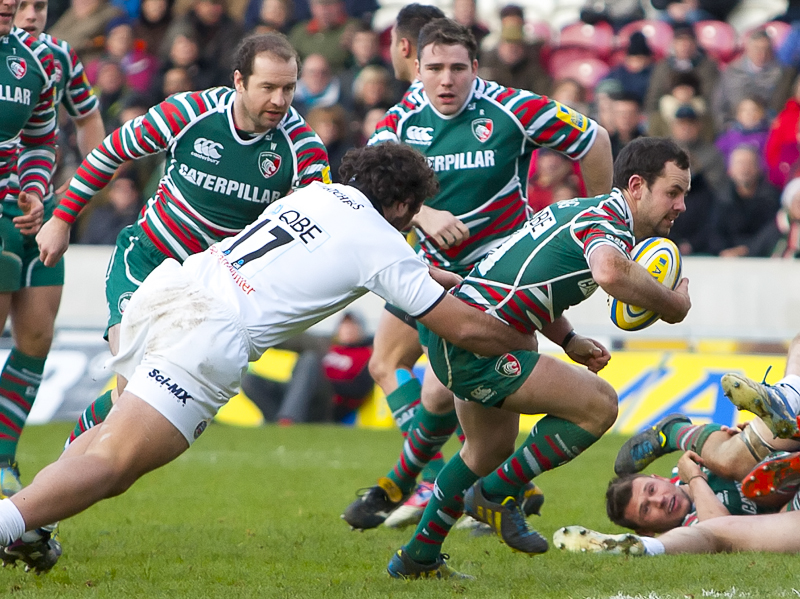
Leicester (green, white and red); the traditional letters denoting their positions can be seen on the front of their shirts above the club badge.

There is nothing in the Laws of Rugby Union that determines if or how players should be individually identified by marking their clothing. However, since 1967, player numbering has been standardised by World Rugby for international matches (1–15, with 1 being loosehead prop and 15 being the fullback; the replacements are then numbered from 16 onwards, with the forwards first from the front row to the number eight, followed by the backs from scrum-half to full-back). English Premiership sides have also adopted this standard numbering system to better aid the understanding of spectators new to the sport, necessitating that Leicester abandon their traditional lettering system, though they have attempted to keep the tradition alive by printing a small letter appropriate to the player's position next to the club badge on the left breast.

In South Africa, the blindside flanker wears 7 and openside flanker wears 6.

== Numbering in rugby sevens ==
In rugby sevens, although World Rugby requires that players wear numbers, it does not dictate a specific scheme tied to the player's position. Accordingly, most teams use permanent squad numbering, although numbering generally starts with the forwards.

== Exceptional systems ==
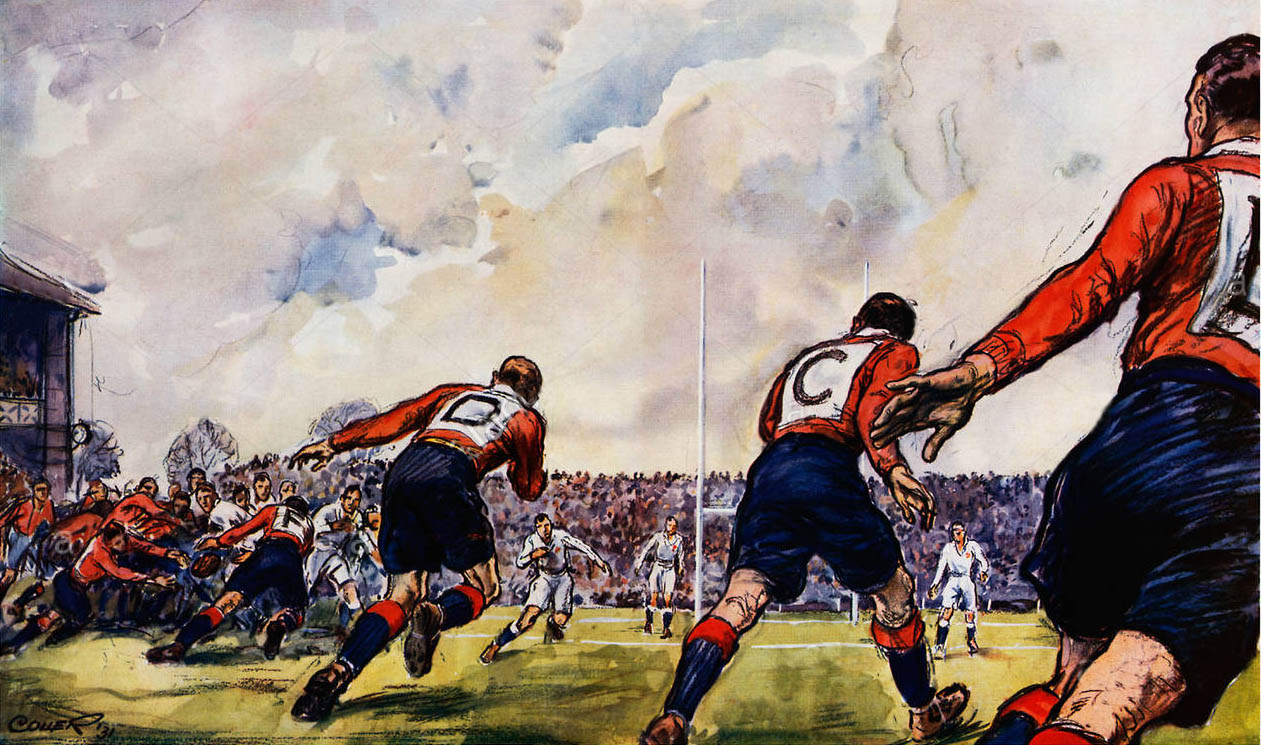
A painting of the England versus Wales rugby match in 1931. Note letters, which are not used any more.

Traditionally, some clubs (notably Bedford Blues, Leicester Tigers and Bristol) have used alternative schemes consisting of letters, and Bath and Richmond have used a scheme without a number 13. Other common variations in the numbering are the interchange of 6 and 7 (particularly in South Africa and Argentina) or of 11 and 14.

Other exceptions include:

- West Hartlepool RFC hung up their No. 5 jersey in memory of their lock John How who died of a heart condition in a 1994 league match.
- Waitete Rugby Club (affiliated to the King Country Rugby Football Union in New Zealand) retired the number 5 jersey and replaced it with 55, in honour of legendary club and national rugby hero All Black Colin Meads.
- The rugby team of the School of Oriental and African Studies, University of London, which used to use a system of ancient Thai numbers, making identification by opposing teams virtually impossible.
- Will Greenwood, who normally played at inside centre, preferred to wear the number 13 shirt rather than the usual number 12 assigned to this position for superstitious reasons. During the 2003 Rugby World Cup Final he played inside centre wearing number 13 and Mike Tindall played outside him in the number 12 shirt.
- Diocesan College, the first school to play rugby in South Africa, has always played without numbers to emphasise that team aspect of the sport. Other South African schools such as Pietermartizburg College in Kwa Zulu Natal province adopted the same approach until recent years when they decided to use player identification numbers likely due to television coverage of matches and referees and officials needing to cite players by number.
- The 1888 British Lions on tour in New Zealand wore different coloured arm-band ribbons that aligned with an index of player names in a match-day programme being sold to the Christchurch crowd by the Canterbury Rugby Union.

== Historical and traditional schemes ==
Position	1950s British custom	Standard modern numbering	Without the number 13	Letters – Leicester-style	Letters – Bristol-style
Full back	1	15	16	O	A
Right wing	2	14	15	N	B
Outside centre	3	13	14	M	C
Inside centre	4	12	12	L	D
Left wing	5	11	11	K	E
Fly-half	6	10	10	J	F
Scrum-half	7	9	9	I	G
Loosehead prop	8	1	1	A	H
Hooker	9	2	2	B	I
Tighthead prop	10	3	3	C	J
Lock	11	4	4	D	K
Lock	12	5	5	E	L
Blindside flanker	13	6	6	F	M
Openside flanker	14	7	7	H	N
Number eight	15	8	8	G	O
Replacements	None until 1968	16 onwards	17 onwards	P onwards	P onwards

== See also ==
- Rugby shirt
- Rugby union positions
