= Stan Meads =

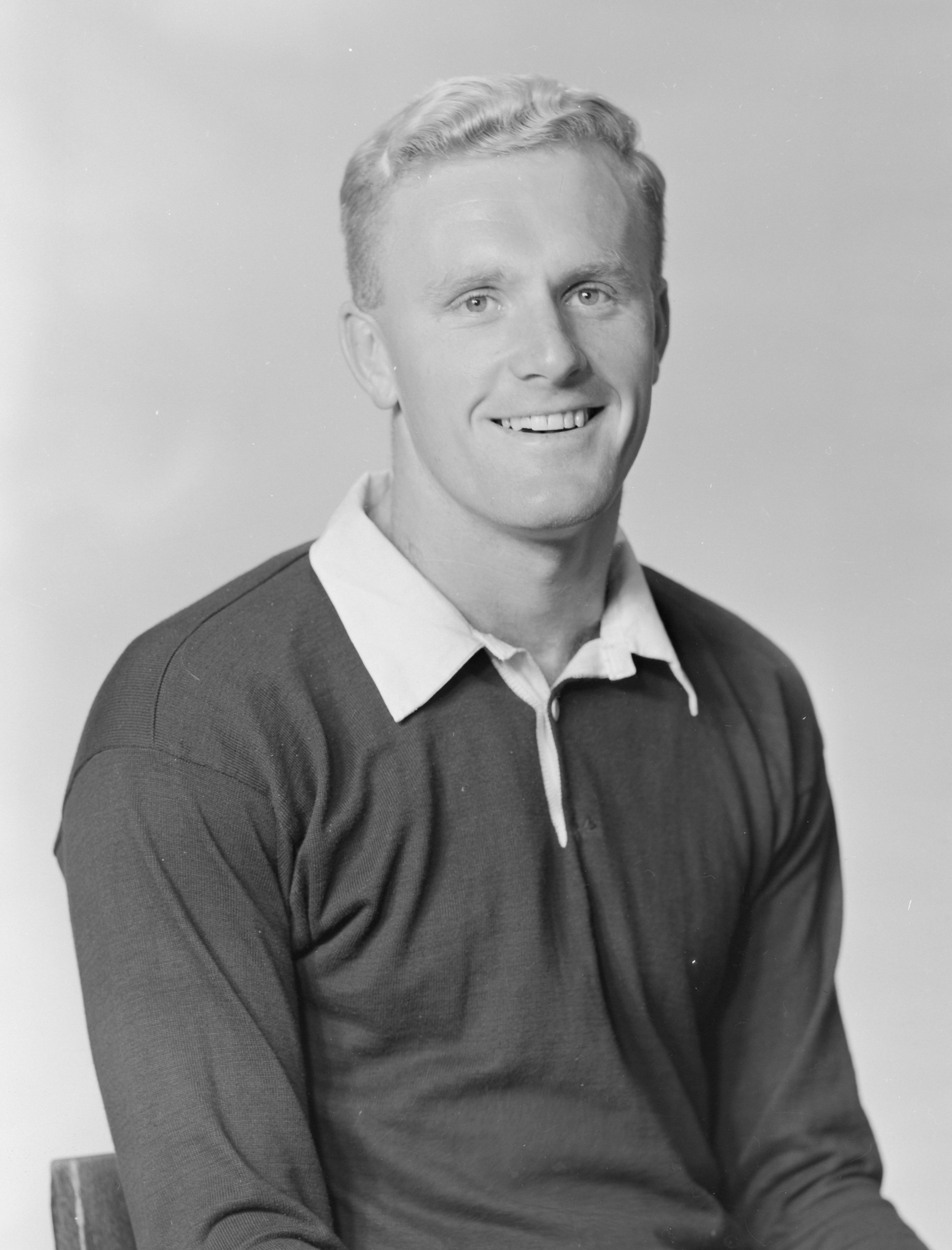
- Meads, c. 1960
- Born: Stanley Thomas Meads; 12 July 1938 (age 88) Arapuni, New Zealand
- Height: 1.91 m (6 ft 3 in)
- Weight: 99 kg (218 lb)
- School: Te Kuiti High School
- Notable relative(s): Colin Meads (brother); Rhonda Wilcox (niece)
- Occupation: Farmer

Rugby union career
- Position(s): Lock, loose forward
Provincial / State sides
Years	Team	Apps	(Points)
1957–1966	King Country	74	(51)
International career
Years	Team	Apps	(Points)
1961–1966	New Zealand	15	(0)
Coaching career
- Years: Team
- 1994–1996: King Country

Stanley Thomas Meads (born 12 July 1938) is a New Zealand former rugby union player and brother of Colin Meads. He played as a lock, number eight and flanker, and scored four tries for New Zealand in 30 games (15 tests). He played for King Country between 1957 and 1966, when he abruptly announced his retirement to concentrate on his sheep farm near Te Kūiti.

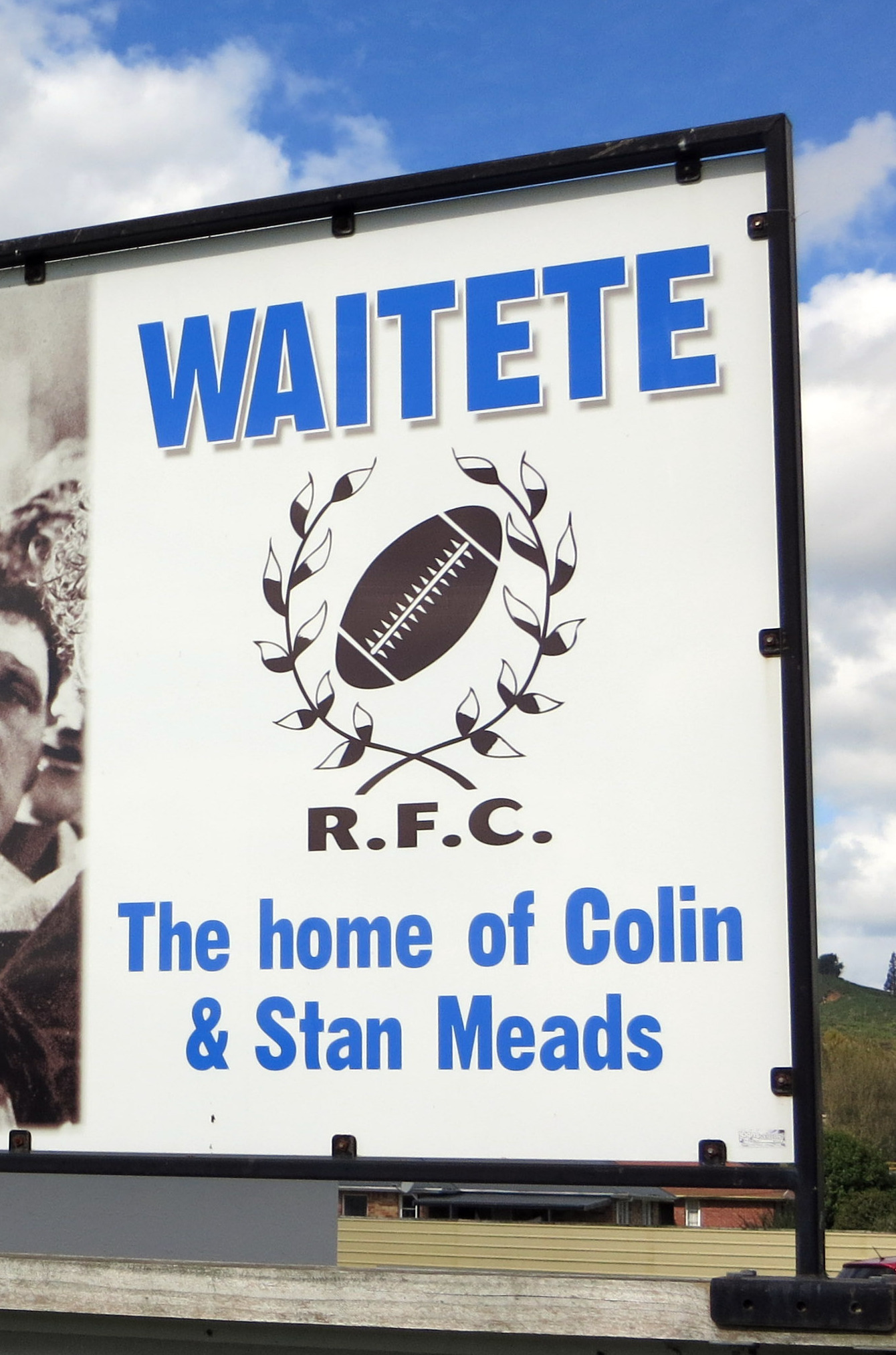
A Waitete Rugby Football Club sign in Te Kuiti honouring Colin and Stan Meads
