= Rhonda Wilcox =

New Zealand netball player

Personal information
- Full name: Rhonda Earlene Wilcox (née Meads)
- Born: 3 November 1961 (age 65)
- Occupation: Manager
- Height: 1.93 m (6 ft 4 in)
- Relatives: Colin Meads (father); Stan Meads (uncle)
- School: Te Kuiti High School

Netball career
- Playing positions: GS, GK
Years	National team	Caps
1982–1985	New Zealand	20
Medal record
Representing New Zealand
Netball World Cup
Silver medal – second place	1983 Singapore	Tournament
World Games
Gold medal – first place	1985 London	Netball

Rhonda Earlene Wilcox (née Meads; born 3 November 1961) is a former New Zealand netballer who played for the New Zealand national team, the Silver Ferns, on 20 occasions.

== Early life and family ==
Wilcox was born Rhonda Earlene Meads on 3 November 1961, the daughter of Colin and Verna Meads. Her father was a leading rugby union player in the 1950s and 1960s, representing his country as a member of the All Blacks in international test matches on 55 occasions. One of five siblings, Wilcox was raised on a farm on the outskirts of Te Kūiti in the North Island of New Zealand, and educated at Te Kuiti High School. Her youngest sister, Shelley Mitchell, played for the New Zealand women's basketball team in 1991 and 1992.

== Netball career ==
Wilcox was first selected to play for the Silver Ferns in 1982, becoming, with her father, the first All Black–Silver Fern, father–daughter combination. Playing in the goal shooter (GS) position, she was at the time the tallest shooter to play for the team, standing at 1.93 metres (6 ft 4 in). In 1982, she toured England, playing her first test match on 13 November. Wilcox played in the 1983 World Netball Championships in Singapore, where New Zealand lost to Australia in the final. In 1985, at the World Games held in London, she switched to playing as the goal keeper (GK). New Zealand won the gold medal, beating Australia in the final.

After retiring from top-level competition, Wilcox continued to play, including for the Riverlands team in the Waikato region, when she played alongside her sister, Shelley Mitchell.

== Later life ==
From 1998 to 2016, Wilcox worked as a supply manager for Air New Zealand. She also occasionally served as a scout for the Silver Ferns.
