= Martin Pelser =

South Africa international rugby union player (1934-2018)

- Full name: Hendrik Jacobus Martin Pelser
- Born: 23 March 1934 Johannesburg, South Africa
- Died: 15 August 2018 (aged 84) Johannesburg, South Africa
- Height: 188 cm (6 ft 2 in)
- Weight: 94 kg (207 lb)
- School: Rossmore

Rugby union career
- Position: Flanker
Provincial / State sides
Years	Team	Apps	(Points)
- Transvaal
International career
Years	Team	Apps	(Points)
1958–61	South Africa	11	(6)

Hendrik Jacobus Martin Pelser (23 March 1934 – 15 August 2018), known as Martin Pelser, was a South African rugby union international who represented the Springboks in 11 test matches.

== Rugby career ==
Born in Johannesburg, Pelser attended Rossmore Junior High School and played his provincial rugby for Transvaal.

Pelser debuted for the Springboks against France at Cape Town in 1958 and played his entire test career as a flanker. In 1960 he scored the only try in South Africa's 8–3 win over the All Blacks in Port Elizabeth. His test career ended when he switched codes and he earned selection for the South Africa national rugby league team, as a second-rower.

All Black Colin Meads described him as "one of the hardest, most skilful players in any position" that he had played against. His iconic glass eye appearance was the result of a childhood car accident.

== See also ==
- List of South Africa national rugby union players
