= Kerri-Jo Te Huia =

Champion sheep shearer

Personal information
- Nationality: New Zealander
- Years active: 2009 -

Sport
- Sport: Sheep shearing

Achievements and titles
- Personal best: World Record for most strong-wool ewes shorn by a women

Kerri-Jo Te Huia is a champion sheep shearer from Te Kūiti, New Zealand.

Te Huia is the youngest of five children, several of whom work in shearing. Her parents were also shearing contractors and trainers.

In 2009, she competed in the New Zealand Shearing Championships in wool handling and intermediate-grade shearing.

In 2012, in her fifth season of shearing, Te Huia broke the women's eight-hour solo lamb shearing world record by shearing 507 lambs; the previous record was 470. She subsequently moved to South Australia, and has worked as a trainer at Women in Shearing workshops at the TAFE institute in Naracoorte.

In 2018, Te Huia broke the women's world record for shearing the most strong-wool ewes in nine hours: 452 ewes. The shearing took place at Otapawa Station in Tiraumea.
