= Te Kūiti =

Town in Waikato, New Zealand

- Minor urban area
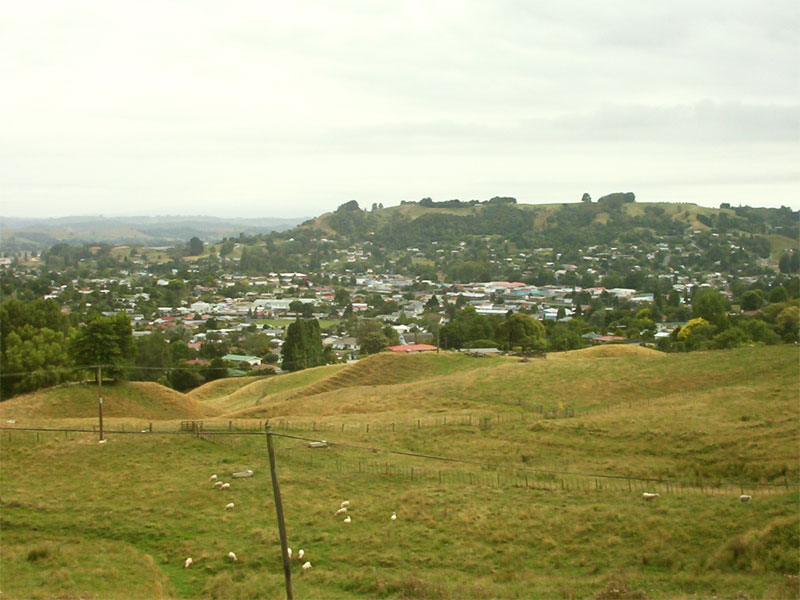
- Te Kūiti viewed from the south-west as SH3 climbs out of the town.
- Interactive map of Te Kūiti
- Coordinates: 38°20′S 175°10′E
- Country: New Zealand
- Region: Waikato region
- District: Waitomo District
- Ward: Te Kuiti Ward
- Electorates: Taranaki-King Country; Te Tai Hauāuru (Māori)

Government
  - Territorial Authority: Waitomo District Council
  - Regional council: Waikato Regional Council
  - Mayor of Waitomo: John Robertson
  - Taranaki-King Country MP: Barbara Kuriger
  - Hauraki-Waikato MP: Hana-Rawhiti Maipi-Clarke

Area
  - Total: 8.41 km^{2} (3.25 sq mi)

Population (June 2025)
  - Total: 4,850
  - Density: 577/km^{2} (1,490/sq mi)
- Postcode(s): 3910

Te Kūiti is a town in the north of the King Country region of the North Island of New Zealand. It lies at the junction of State Highways 3 and 30 and on the North Island Main Trunk railway, 80 kilometres (50 mi) south of Hamilton. The town promotes itself as the sheep shearing capital of the world and is host to the annual New Zealand National Shearing Championships.

Te Kūiti is approximately 80 km south of Hamilton and 19 km south-east of Waitomo. The area around Te Kūiti, commonly known as the King Country, gives its name to the Heartland Championship rugby team based in Te Kūiti.

== History and culture ==
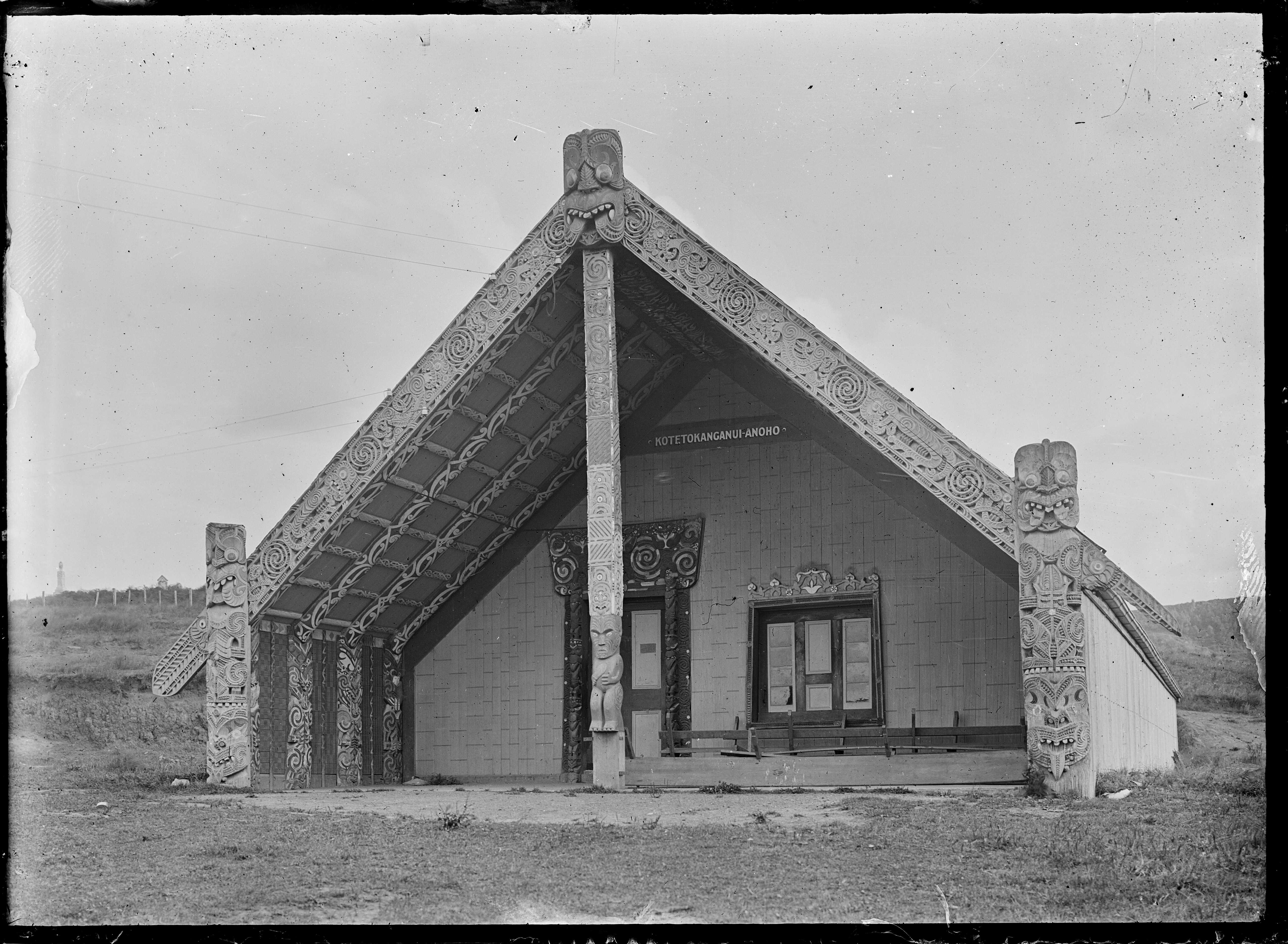
Te Tokanganui-a-Noho meeting house in Te Kūiti, 1917

Te Kūiti is the Māori name given to the area. In its original form of "Te Kūititanga", it literally means "the valley", "the squeezing in" or "the narrowing".

Several marae are located in and around Te Kūiti, associated with Ngāti Maniapoto hapū:

- Te Kumi Marae and Te Korapatū meeting house are affiliated with Ngāti Peehi and Rōrā
- Mōtītī Marae and Ko te Hungaiti or Hapainga meeting house are affiliated with Ngāti Kinohaku, Ngāti Putaitemuri and Ngāti Tauhunu
- Te Piruru Papakāinga Marae and Te Pukenui o Taonui meeting house are affiliated with Ngāti Rōrā
- Tāne Hopuwai Marae and Tāne Hopuwai meeting house are affiliated with Ngāti Apakura
- Te Tokanganui a Noho Marae and meeting house are affiliated with Ngāti Rōrā. This wharenui was constructed in 1873 for Te Kooti and his followers, and was one of the largest wharenui ever built at the time.
- Tomotuki Marae and Parekatini meeting house are affiliated with Apakura, Parekaitini and Ngāti Rōrā
- Te Waipatoto Marae, and Waipatoto and Waipatoto Tuarua meeting houses, are affiliated with Ngāti Kinohaku

== Geography ==
Limestone deposits and water have created the Waitomo Caves, northwest of the town, one of New Zealand's most-visited tourist locations. The town itself is located in a valley with many rich limestone deposits. The Manga-o-Kewa Stream runs through the valley and is a tributary of the Waipā River. Te Kūiti's hinterland consist mainly of farmland and limestone quarries. The land surrounding Te Kūiti has steep hilly relief which reflects the nature of the North King Country region. The climate of Te Kūiti is wet during the winter and dry during the late summer with an average of 1,450mm of rainfall each year.

=== Climate ===
Climate data for Te Kuiti (1991–2020)
Month	Jan	Feb	Mar	Apr	May	Jun	Jul	Aug	Sep	Oct	Nov	Dec	Year
Mean daily maximum °C (°F)	24.4 (75.9)	24.9 (76.8)	23.3 (73.9)	20.1 (68.2)	16.9 (62.4)	14.3 (57.7)	13.6 (56.5)	14.7 (58.5)	16.5 (61.7)	18.0 (64.4)	20.1 (68.2)	22.4 (72.3)	19.1 (66.4)
Daily mean °C (°F)	18.3 (64.9)	18.9 (66.0)	17.0 (62.6)	14.3 (57.7)	11.6 (52.9)	9.4 (48.9)	8.6 (47.5)	9.6 (49.3)	11.4 (52.5)	13.0 (55.4)	14.5 (58.1)	17.0 (62.6)	13.6 (56.5)
Mean daily minimum °C (°F)	12.3 (54.1)	12.8 (55.0)	10.7 (51.3)	8.5 (47.3)	6.3 (43.3)	4.4 (39.9)	3.6 (38.5)	4.5 (40.1)	6.4 (43.5)	8.0 (46.4)	9.0 (48.2)	11.5 (52.7)	8.2 (46.7)
Average rainfall mm (inches)	83.8 (3.30)	82.7 (3.26)	75.8 (2.98)	107.9 (4.25)	140.9 (5.55)	144.1 (5.67)	174.1 (6.85)	138.8 (5.46)	137.5 (5.41)	133.6 (5.26)	115.0 (4.53)	129.3 (5.09)	1,463.5 (57.61)
Mean monthly sunshine hours	221.6	180.7	191.4	147.5	120.6	102.5	109.6	127.8	134.2	164.6	184.8	185.8	1,871.1
Source: NIWA

== Demographics ==
Stats NZ describes Te Kūiti as a small urban area which covers 8.41 km^{2} (3.25 sq mi). It had an estimated population of 4,850 as of June 2025, with a population density of 576.7 people per km^{2}.

Historical population
Year	Pop.	±% p.a.
2001	4,374	—
2006	4,494	+0.54%
2013	4,257	−0.77%
2018	4,572	+1.44%
2023	4,659	+0.38%

Te Kūiti had a population of 4,659 in the 2023 New Zealand census, an increase of 87 people (1.9%) since the 2018 census, and an increase of 402 people (9.4%) since the 2013 census. There were 2,298 males, 2,349 females, and 12 people of other genders in 1,638 dwellings. 2.2% of people identified as LGBTIQ+. The median age was 37.7 years (compared with 38.1 years nationally). There were 1,035 people (22.2%) aged under 15 years, 852 (18.3%) aged 15 to 29, 1,935 (41.5%) aged 30 to 64, and 837 (18.0%) aged 65 or older.

People could identify as more than one ethnicity. The results were 50.9% European; 54.2% Māori; 6.6% Pasifika; 7.6% Asian; 0.4% Middle Eastern, Latin American and African New Zealanders (MELAA); and 1.8% other, which includes people giving their ethnicity as "New Zealander". English was spoken by 95.0%, Māori by 15.2%, Samoan by 1.9%, and other languages by 6.3%. No language could be spoken by 2.6% (e.g. too young to talk). New Zealand Sign Language was known by 0.6%. The percentage of people born overseas was 13.1, compared with 28.8% nationally.

Religious affiliations were 27.6% Christian, 1.4% Hindu, 1.4% Islam, 5.8% Māori religious beliefs, 0.6% Buddhist, 0.6% New Age, 0.1% Jewish, and 1.0% other religions. People who answered that they had no religion were 53.2%, and 9.0% of people did not answer the census question.

Of those at least 15 years old, 390 (10.8%) people had a bachelor's or higher degree, 1,887 (52.1%) had a post-high school certificate or diploma, and 1,338 (36.9%) people exclusively held high school qualifications. The median income was $31,900, compared with $41,500 nationally. 132 people (3.6%) earned over $100,000 compared to 12.1% nationally. The employment status of those at least 15 was 1,641 (45.3%) full-time, 456 (12.6%) part-time, and 177 (4.9%) unemployed.

Individual statistical areas
Name	Area (km^{2})	Population	Density (per km^{2})	Dwellings	Median age	Median income
Te Kūiti West	2.59	2,607	1,007	936	38.5 years	$31,600
Te Kūiti East	5.82	2,052	353	705	36.5 years	$32,200
New Zealand					38.1 years	$41,500

== Tourism ==
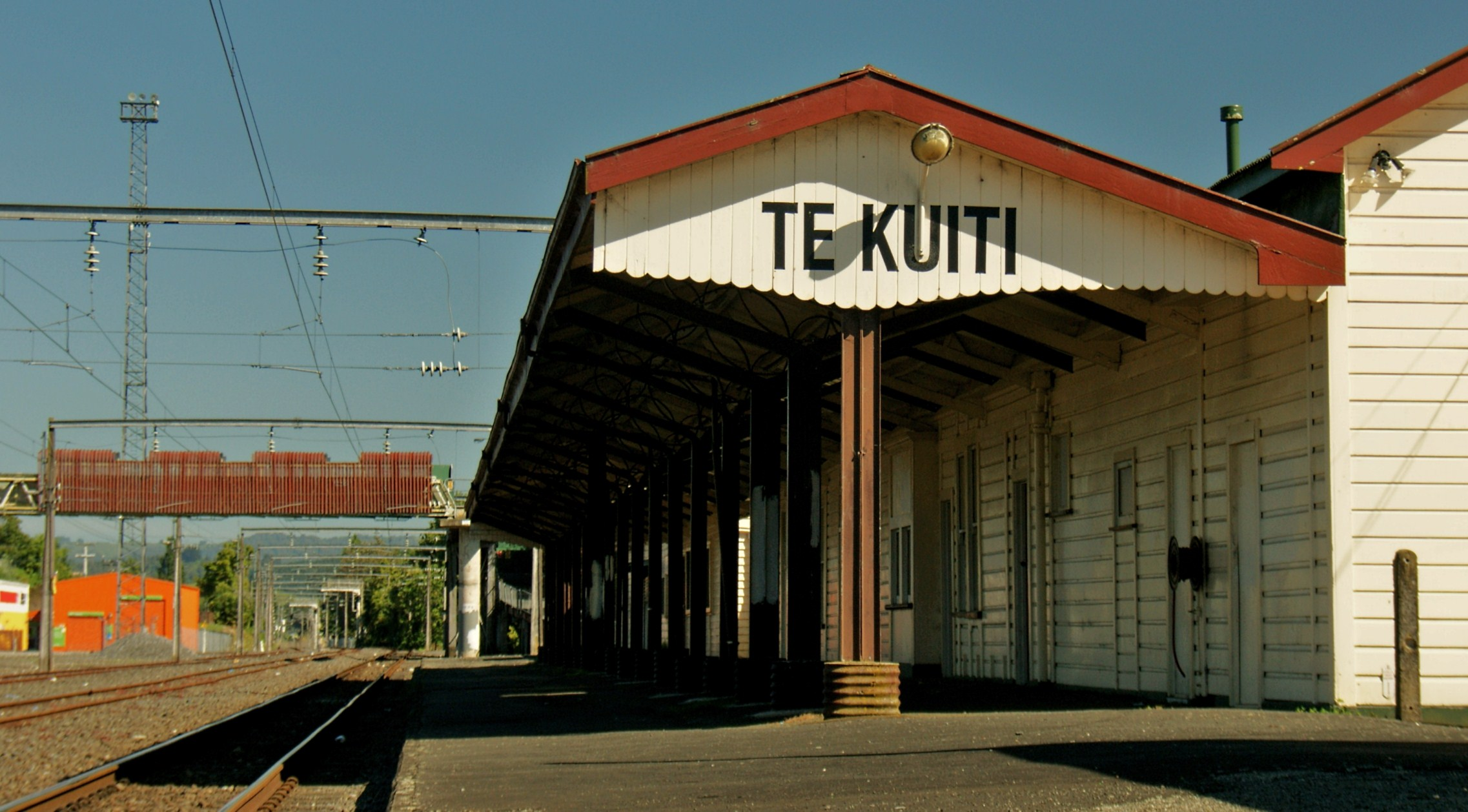
Te Kūiti railway station

The "Shearing Capital of the World" contains the world's largest shearer, seven metres high. On 1 April 2006 the largest sheep show in the world took place here, with more than 2000 sheep.

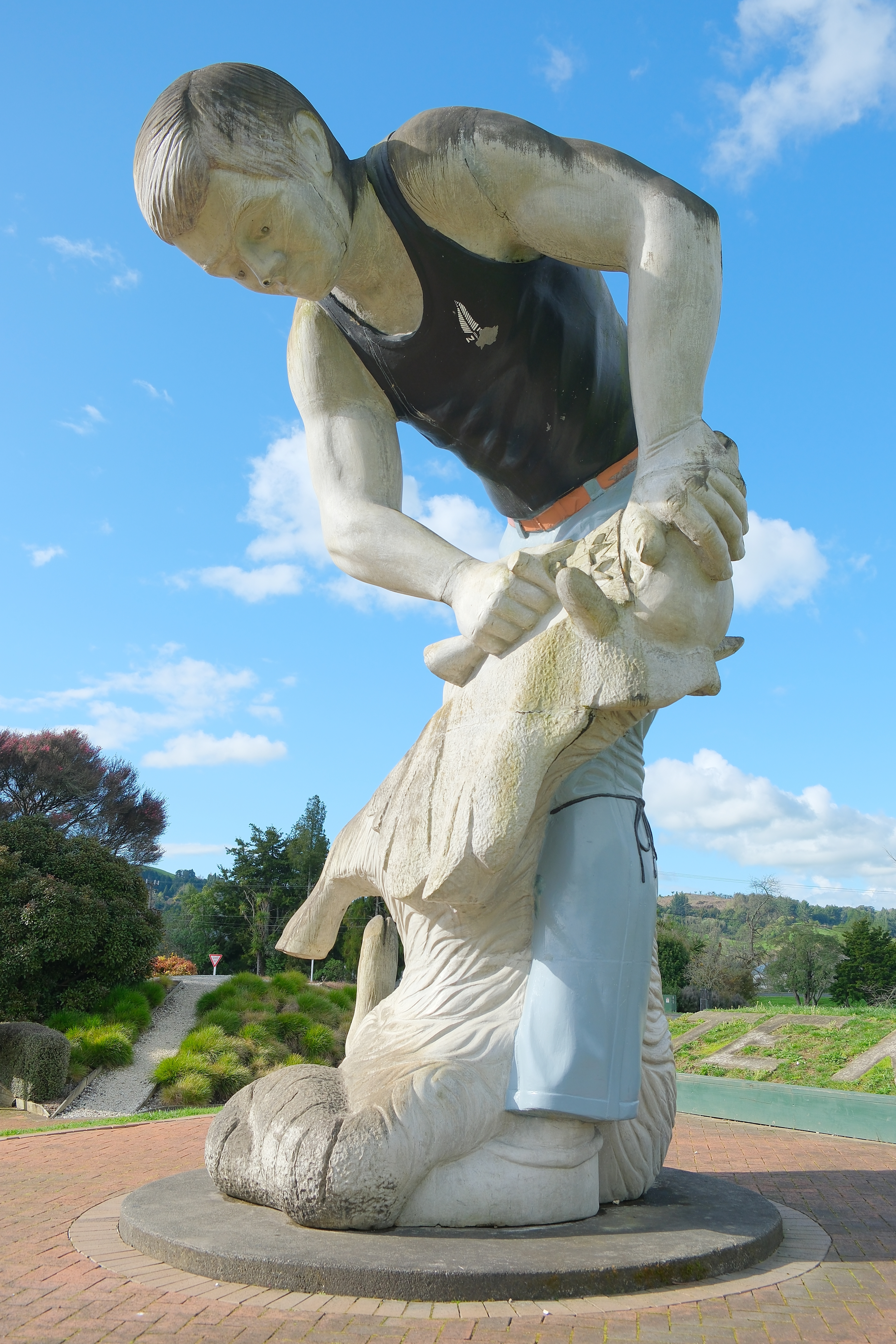
Statue celebrating the shearing industry in Te Kūiti

The carved Te Tokanganui-a-Noho meeting house was gifted to the local Māori people (Ngāti Maniapoto) by Te Kooti, a prominent 19th-century Māori leader and founder of the Ringatū faith. He was given sanctuary by the chiefs of Maniapoto against the white colonial Government of New Zealand and under Maniapoto's protection carved one of the most famous and important late 19th century spiritual houses in the North Island. This house is central to Te Kūiti's historical foundation, also referred to as the epicentre of the Rohe Pōtae or "King Country". In 1881 the last frontier was opened to colonial settlers.

The Tatsuno Japanese Garden is at the southern end of the main street.

The Mangaokewa reserve located 5 km south of Te Kūiti is a popular attraction for rock climbers, hikers, picnic goers, swimmers and trout fisherman in the region.

A 'Revitalisation Project' for the NZHPT Category II listed Te Kuiti railway station was started in 2014 to provide for arts and crafts groups, an education centre, youth projects, historical displays and a meeting room. The Rail Heritage Trust describes the station as, "the finest remaining example of a standard class B station".

== Sport ==
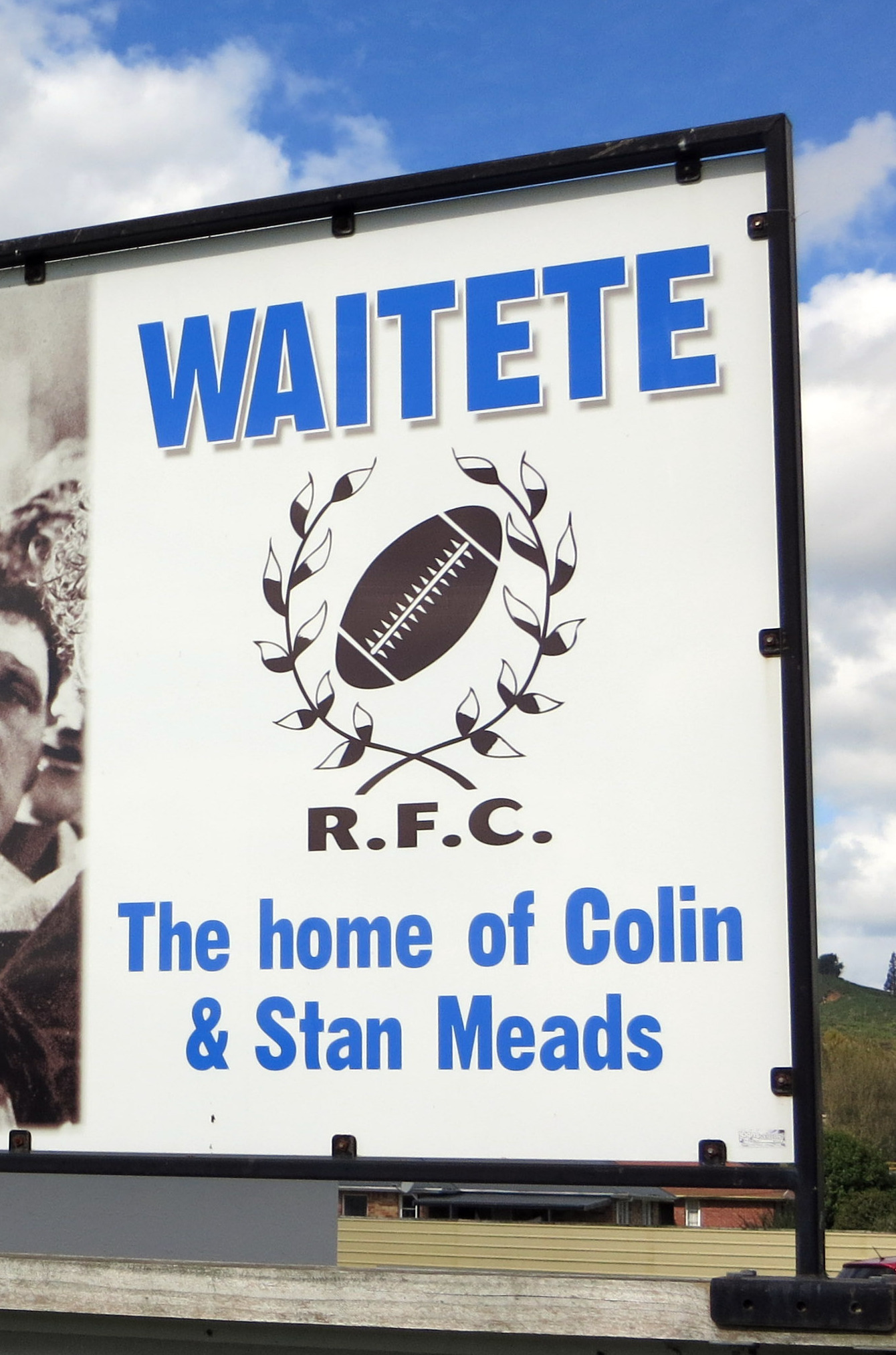
Sign for Waitete Rugby Club, the home of Colin and Stan Meads.

Te Kūiti is the home of the Waitete Rugby Football Club and the King Country Rugby Union, both of whom are based at Rugby Park. The famous Colin Meads spent the entirety of his career with both Waitete and King Country. The town also has an association football club, Te Kuiti Albion Football Club, who play in the Deacon Shield tournament. They play their home games at Centennial Park where there is a small clubroom. The club colours are yellow and black striped shirts and black shorts.

== Education ==
Te Kūiti has six schools:

- Te Kūiti Primary School is a state primary school, with a roll of 324. It opened in 1897 as a native school, and was transferred to the Education Department in 1906. In 1914 it became part of the Te Kuiti District High School. It became a separate school again in 1955.
- Pukenui School is a state primary school, with a roll of 128.
- Centennial Park School is a state primary school, with a roll of 76. It celebrated its 25th anniversary in 1981.
- St Joseph's Catholic School is a Catholic state integrated primary school, with a roll of 66. It opened in 1921.
- Te Kūiti High School is a state secondary school, with a roll of 304. It opened in 1914 as Te Kuiti District High School In 1955 it separated from the primary school to become Te Kuiti High School.
- Te Wharekura o Maniapoto is a state Māori immersion school, with a roll of 126. It opened as a native school in 1906, and became a mainstream school in the 1920s. In 1991 it became a Kura kaupapa school.

All these schools are co-educational. Rolls are as of July 2026.

== Notable people ==
- Ross Beever, geneticist and mycologist
- Rodney Bell, contemporary dancer
- Former prime minister of New Zealand Jim Bolger held the local electorate of King Country.
- Kevin Boroevich, former rugby union footballer
- Walter Broadfoot (1881–1965), cabinet minister for the National Party, was first deputy mayor and then mayor of Te Kūiti (1923–1935)
- Kim Chambers, marathon swimmer.
- John Dinsdale, RAF pilot raised in Te Kuiti
- David Fagan, World champion sheep shearer
- Kerri-Jo Te Huia, champion sheep shearer
- Murray Kidd, former rugby union coach for the Irish national team (1995–1997)
- Tony Martin, Australia-based comedian and author
- Sir Colin Meads, a former All Black, lived in Te Kūiti. The auction of his farm in 2008 caused nationwide interest. A statue of Meads was unveiled in the town centre during the 2017 British & Irish Lions tour to New Zealand, also drawing national interest, and Meads was present and spoke at the unveiling despite battling cancer, which he died from two months later.
- Stanley Meads, a brother of Colin Meads, also lived in Te Kūiti
- Les Munro, the last surviving pilot from the Dambusters air raid, was mayor for some years and has a street named in his honour
- Ruth Park, author
- Kevin Proctor, rugby league footballer
- Diggeress Te Kanawa, a tohunga raranga (master weaver) of Ngati Maniapoto and Ngati Kinohaku descent
- Rob Waddell, Olympic gold-medalist rower
- Doug Hood, music producer and promoter
