= Rugby union positions =

15 on-field positions in the sport

This illustrates the common position names and shirt numbers for 15-a-side Rugby Union.

In the game of rugby union, there are 15 players on each team, comprising eight forwards (wearing jerseys numbered 1–8) and seven backs (numbered 9–15). In addition, there may be up to eight replacement players "on the bench", numbered 16–23. Players are not restricted to a single position, although they generally specialise in just one or two that suit their skills and body types. Players that play multiple positions are called "utility players".

The scrum (a contest used to restart play) must consist of eight players from each team: the "front row" (two props – a loosehead and tighthead – and a hooker), the "second row" (two locks), and a "back row" (two flankers and a number 8). The players outside the scrum are called "the backs": scrum-half, fly-half, inside centre, outside centre, two wings, and a fullback.

Forwards compete for the ball in scrums and line-outs and are generally bigger and stronger than the backs. Props push in the scrums, while the hooker tries to secure the ball for their team by "hooking" it back with their foot. The hooker is also usually responsible for throwing the ball in at line-outs, where it is mostly competed for by the locks, who are generally the tallest players on the team. The flankers and number eight are expected to be the first players to arrive at a breakdown and play an important role in securing possession of the ball for their team.

The backs play behind the forwards and are usually more lightly built and faster. Successful backs are skilful at passing and kicking. Full-backs need to be good defenders and kickers, and have the ability to catch a kicked ball. The wingers are usually among the fastest players in a team, and score many of the tries. The centres' key attacking roles are to break through the defensive line and link successfully with wingers. The fly-half can be a good kicker and generally directs the back line. The scrum-half retrieves the ball from the forwards and needs a quick and accurate pass to get the ball to the backs (often first to the fly-half).

== Overview ==
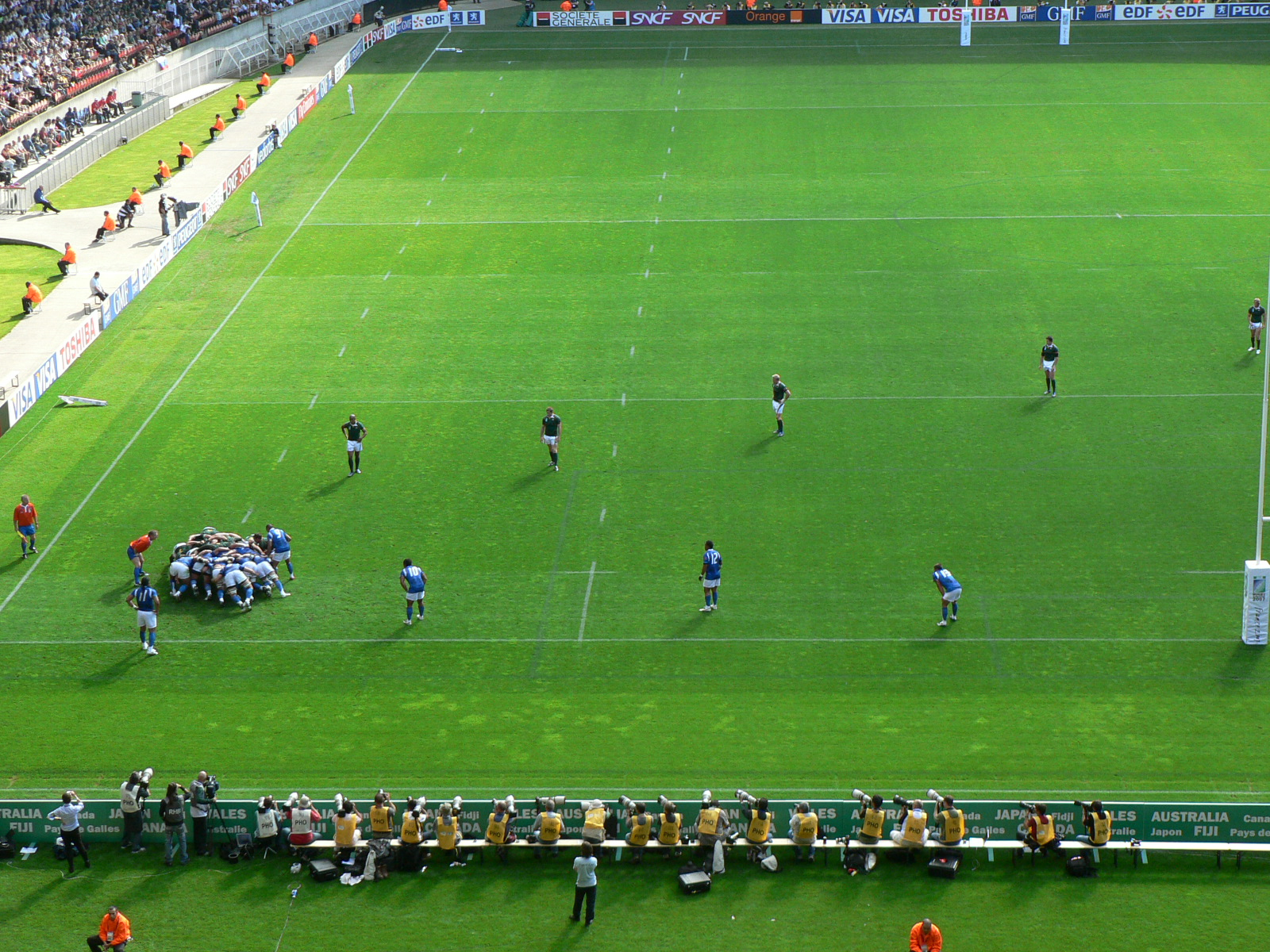
The forwards are in the scrum while the backs are lined up across the field.

A maximum of 15 players from each team are allowed to be playing at any time. The players' positions at the start of the game are indicated by the numbers on the backs of their shirts, 1 to 15. The positions are divided into two main categories; forwards (numbered 1 to 8) and backs (numbered 9 to 15). In international matches, there are eight substitutes that can replace an on-field team-mate. The substitutes, numbered 16 to 23, can either take up the position of the player they replace or the on-field players can be shuffled to make room for this player in another position. Typically, the forwards among the substitutes will have lower numbers than the backs. There are no personal squad numbers and a versatile player's position and number may change from one game to the next. Players can also change positions during the match; common examples are the fly-half playing the full-back's position in defence or a prop taking the hooker's position at line-outs.

Different positions on the field suit certain skill sets and body types, generally leading to players specialising in a small number of positions. Each position has certain roles to play on the field, although most have been established through convention rather than law. During general play, as long as they are not offside, the players may be positioned anywhere on the field.

== History ==
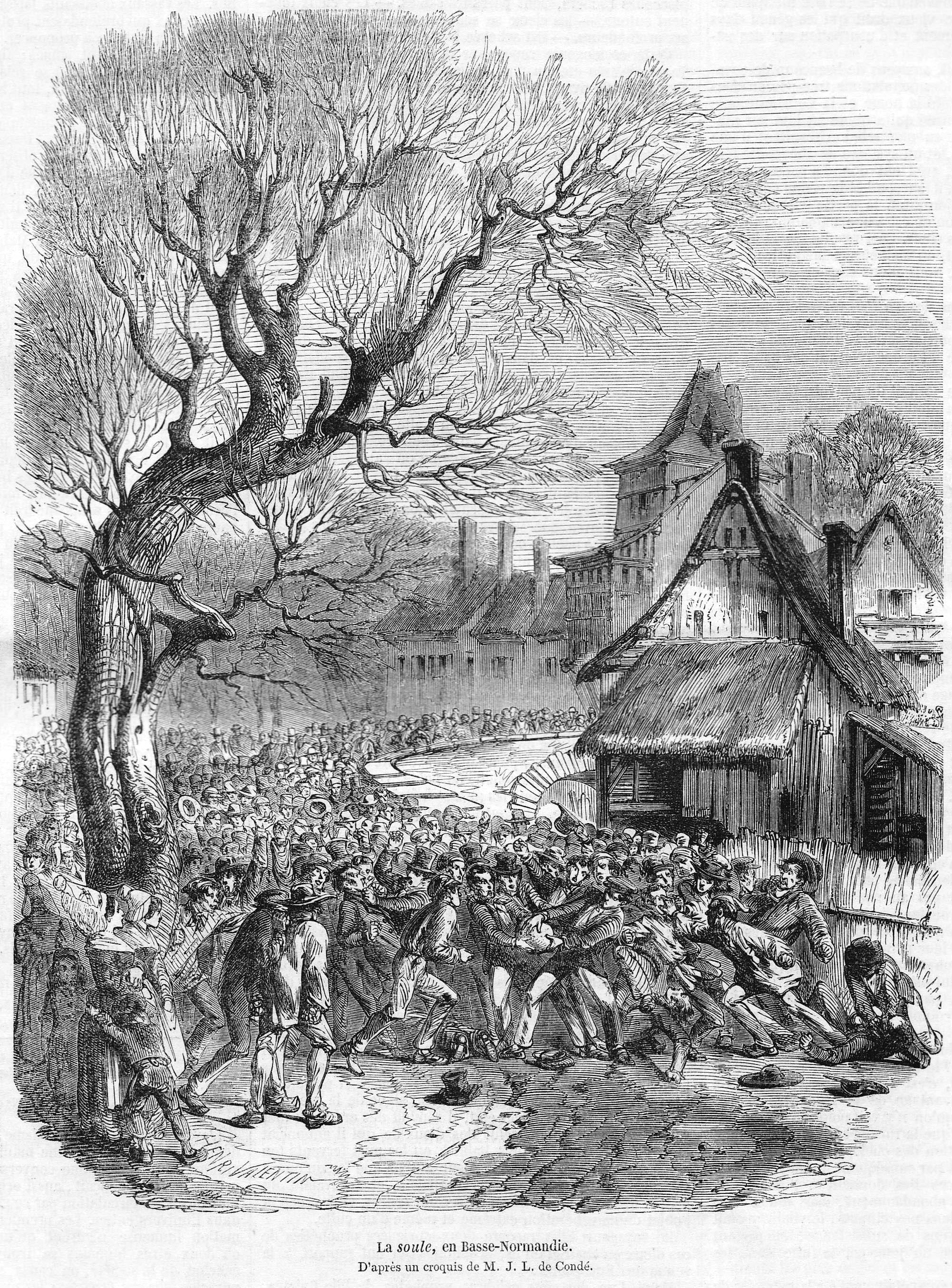
A scrummage in a traditional football game in Lower Normandy, France, 1867

During early rugby union games there were only really two positions. Most players were in the forwards, who formed part of the scrimmage (which later was called "scrummage" and then "scrum"), and a few defensive "tends" (from "goaltenders").

Eventually, the attacking possibilities of playing close behind the scrimmage were recognised. The players who stationed themselves between the forwards and tends became known as "half-tends". Later, it was observed that the players outside scrimmage were not limited to a defensive role, so the tends and half-tends were renamed "backs" and "half-backs". As the game became more sophisticated, the backs positioned at different depths behind the forwards. They were further differentiated into half-backs, three-quarter-backs, and full-back. Specialised roles for the scrum also evolved with "wing-forward" (modern day flankers) being employed to protect the half-back.

The first international between England and Scotland was played in 1871 and consisted of 20 players on each side: thirteen forwards, three half-backs, one three-quarter and three full-backs. The player numbers were reduced to fifteen in 1877. Numbers were added to the backs of players' jerseys in the 1920s, initially as a way for coaches and selectors to rate individual players.

== English names of positions ==
The various positions have had different names over time, and many are known by different names in different countries. Players in the flanker positions were originally known as "wing forwards", while in the backs, "centre three-quarter" and "wing three-quarter" were used to describe the outside centre and wing respectively (although the terms are still sometimes used in the Northern Hemisphere) The names used by World Rugby tend to reflect Northern Hemisphere usage although fly-half is still often known as "outside-half" or "stand-off" in Britain, and "outhalf" in Ireland. In New Zealand, the scrum-half is still referred to as the "half-back", the fly-half as "first five-eighth", the inside centre as "second five-eighth" and the outside centre simply as "centre". In South Africa the number 8 is known as "eighth man", and in the United States and Canada as "8-man".

Collective terms are also used to describe similar positions; the props and hooker form the "front row", the locks the "second row" and the flankers and number 8 the "back row", "loose forwards" or "loosies". The front row and second row combined are termed the "tight five". In the backs, "half-backs" can be used to describe the scrum-half and fly-half; "inside backs" to describe the scrum-half, fly-half and inside centre; "midfield" for the fly-half and both centres (in New Zealand it refers only to the second five-eighth and centre); "outside backs" for the outside centre, wings and full-back: and "back three" the wings and full-back.

The two props are distinguished by being either a "tighthead" (their head is positioned between the opposition prop and hooker) or "loosehead" (their head is positioned on the outside of the scrum). The "blindside flanker" binds to the scrum on the side closest to the side line, while the "openside flanker" binds on the side with the most space between the scrum and the sideline.

== Backs ==
=== Full-back ===
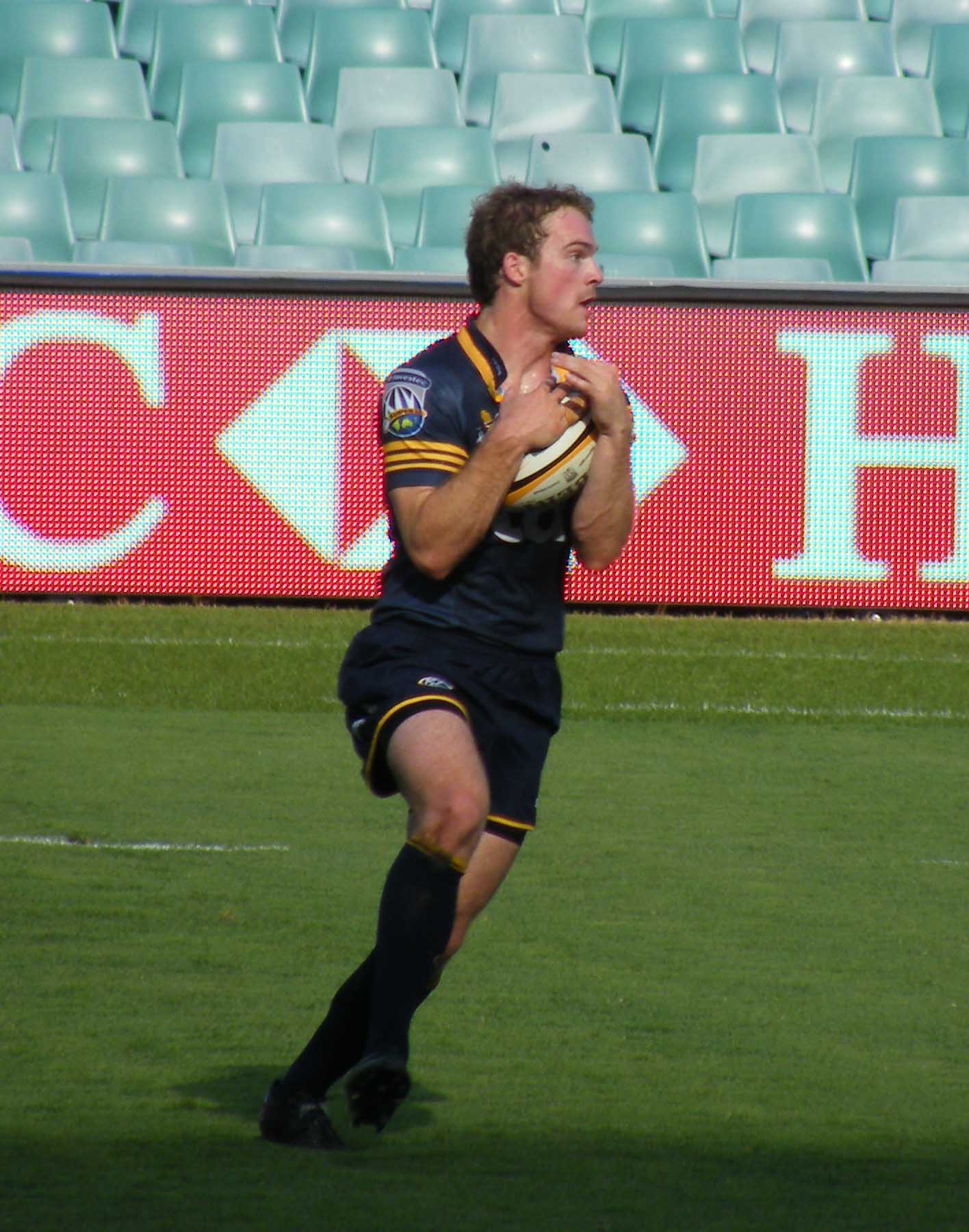
A full-back, Pat McCabe, fields the ball from a kick.

Full-backs (number 15) usually position themselves several yards behind the back line in defence. They field any deep opposition kicks and are often the last line of defence should an opponent break through the back line. On attack, they can enter the back line, usually near the centres or wings, with the aim of providing an extra person and overlapping the defending players. Three of the most important attributes of a good full-back are good catching ability under a high kick, the ability to punt the ball a long distance with accuracy, and the speed and skill to join in back line attacking moves, especially counter-attacks. The full-back is the player most likely to field the high ball or "up and unders" kicked by the opposition. Good hands are needed to ensure the ball is caught cleanly to deny the opposition the chance to regain possession. As the full-back will inevitably catch the ball deep in their own territory with little support from their own players, they should either kick the ball downfield or run forward to link up with their backs to start a counter-attack. If the full-back kicks the ball out, the opposition have the line-out, whereas if they start a counter-attack they have a number of options.

To provide effective cover behind the defensive line, good full-backs are careful not to get caught out of position and must anticipate the opposition's play. Their position behind the backline allows them to see any holes in the defensive line and they either communicate with the backs to close the gaps up or cover the gaps themselves. The full-back has the most potential for attacking the opposition, especially from a misdirected kick. If a kick is fielded and there is enough space and support, the full-back may decide to counter-attack by running the ball back towards the opposition. Due to their kicking skills, in some teams the full-back is also responsible for taking the goal kicks.

For much of the history of the sport, the full-back position was almost totally defensive. Originally, the ball could be kicked directly into touch from any spot on the field, with a line-out then following at the spot where the ball went into touch. This effectively placed a premium on full-backs' skills in kicking from hand. The first test tries by full-backs in international matches came relatively early, in 1878 and 1880, but it was not until 1934 that a full-back scored a try in the competition now known as the Six Nations Championship. Only three tries had been scored by full-backs in the Championship prior to 1969. According to rugby historian John Griffiths, the worldwide adoption of the current law restricting direct kicking into touch in September 1968 (a law previously used in Australia) "revolutionised full-back play". J. P. R. Williams of Wales was the first full-back to regularly score tries after the law change, scoring six times in Five Nations matches in the 1970s.

Notable full-backs include Serge Blanco, who scored 38 tries in 93 tests for France and was known for his counter-attacking ability. In 1997, he was among the inaugural set of rugby players inducted into the International Rugby Hall of Fame and in 2011 he was also inducted into the IRB Hall of Fame. Four full-backs who played for the British and Irish Lions are in the International Rugby Hall of Fame; Gavin Hastings (also inducted into the IRB Hall in 2013) and Andy Irvine from Scotland, Tom Kiernan from Ireland and the aforementioned Williams. Hastings and Irvine were accurate goal-kickers and Kiernan is credited with being the first attacking full-back in Irish rugby. Williams was chosen as the greatest Lions full-back at the inaugural Lions Legends Dinner at Lord's in 2008 and is praised for his safety under the high ball, tackling and calm decision making. The other full-backs in the International Rugby Hall of Fame are Don Clarke and George Nēpia from New Zealand. Clarke, nicknamed "the boot", was an accurate goal kicker and Nēpia was noted for his tackling and kicking ability. Also notable is the Red Roses' Ellie Kildunne, the World Rugby Women's 15s Player of the Year 2024, famed for her incredible speed and fondness for the "chip-and-chase" tries.

=== Three-quarters ===
==== Wing ====
Kenki Fukuoka, a wing playing in 2018

The wings are generally positioned on the outside of the backline with the number 11 on the left and the number 14 on the right. Their primary function is to finish off moves and score tries. Wingers are usually the fastest players in the team and tend to be either elusive runners or, more recently, big, strong and able to break tackles. The skills needed for the left wing and right wing are similar, although left-footed players are usually played on the left wing as they can step and kick better off their left foot. The winger on the blindside often "comes off the wing" to provide an extra man in the midfield, in the same way as would a full-back. One or both wingers will usually drop back on opposition kicks to give the full-back extra options for counter-attacking.

There have been a number of notable wings throughout history. David Campese, a member of both the International and IRB Halls of Fame, played 101 times for Australia and held the world record for most tries in test matches. He was famous for his goose step and reverse pass. Welsh international Gerald Davies was influential in helping the British Lions of 1971 become the only Lions touring party to win a test series in New Zealand. Ieuan Evans played 72 games for Wales and scored 33 tries – at that time a record for Wales. In 1994, International Rugby Hall of Famer John Kirwan retired as the (then) most capped player and highest try scorer in All Black history.

Portia Woodman, who has played for the Black Ferns XV from 2013, is widely regarded as the best women's winger of all time, as the all-time try scorer in Rugby World Cup history with 32 tries, the record across both men's and women's tests. Cheryl Soon is an Australian international winger who captained the Wallaroos and inducted into the World Rugby Hall of Fame in 2021 as a pioneering outside back and also as a global ambassador for the women's game. Also in the WRHOF is Magalis Harvey, a legendary Canadian winger who became the first North American player to win the IRB Women's Player of the Year award in 2014 after scoring one of the most famous 80-metre solo tries in World Cup history. Another iconic winger is Kat Merchant, who scored 44 tries in 58 test matches for England women's national rugby union team (the Red Roses).

Tony O'Reilly played wing for Ireland between 1955 and 1970 and scored a record 38 tries on two Lions tours. André Boniface is a French international that is a member of both the International Rugby Hall of Fame and the IRB Hall of Fame. Also in the IRB Hall of Fame is Bill Maclagan, a 19th-century player for Scotland and the Lions, who played at three-quarters, which eventually evolved into the modern position of wing. Another 2011 inductee in the IRB Hall is Brian Lima of Samoa, who played most of his career on the wing but ended it as a centre. He participated in five World Cups for Manu Samoa and became known as "The Chiropractor" for his ferocious tackling.

In 2012 Demi Sakata, a Japan star, who was considered one of the world's top players of the 1960s, became his country's first inductee into the IRB Hall.

Jonah Lomu entered the International Hall in 2007 and the IRB Hall of Fame in 2011, debuted as the youngest ever All Black.

==== Centre ====
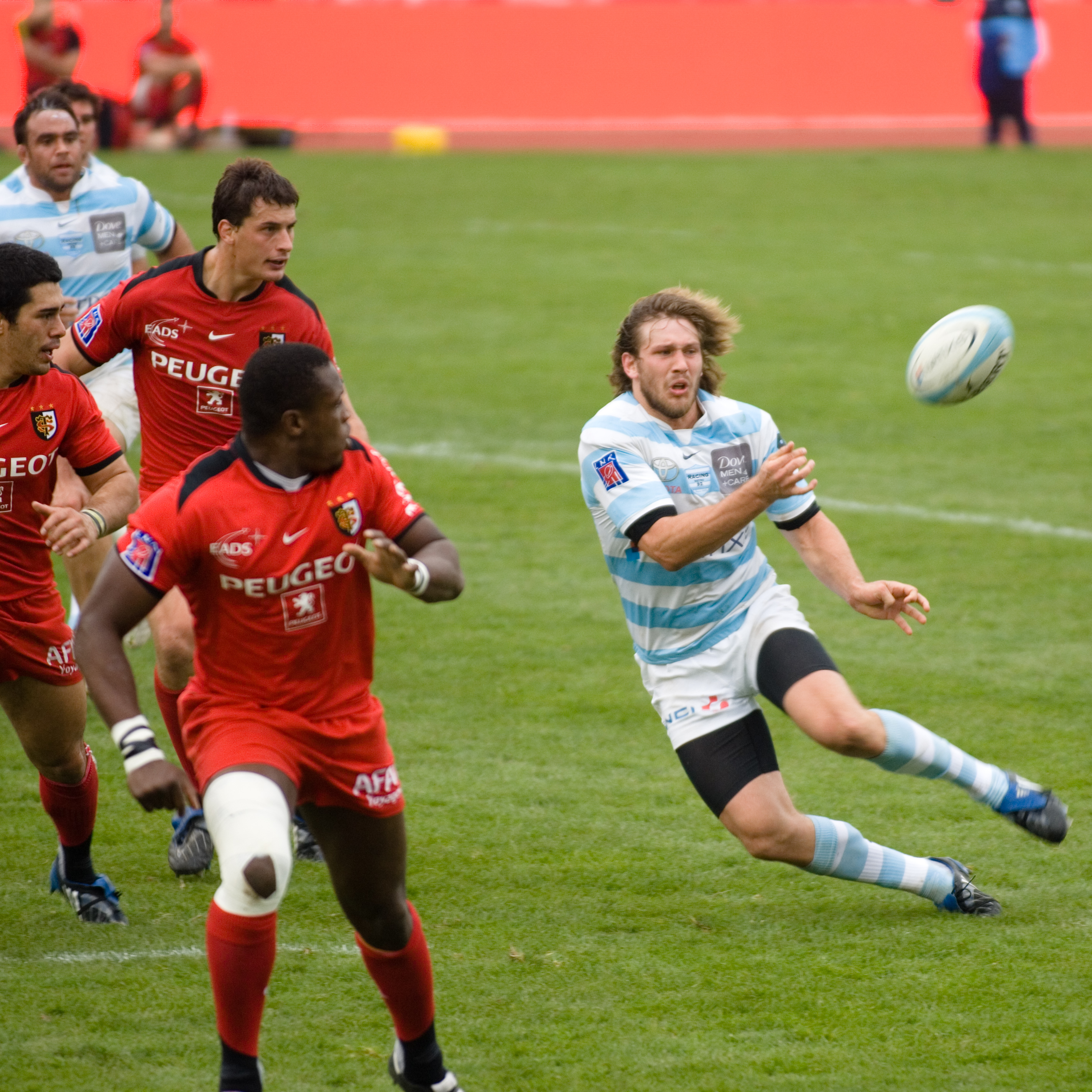
Centre François Steyn passing the ball

There are two centres in a rugby team, inside centre (number 12) and outside centre (number 13). The inside centre usually stands close to the fly-half or at first receiver on the other side of the scrum or breakdown. Like the fly-half, they generally possess a good kicking game and are good at reading the play and directing the attack. The outside centre is positioned outside the inside centre and is generally the faster of the two. Outside centres generally have more room to move than inside centres. Centres also provide support at the breakdowns and can run as decoys to confuse the defence.

Brian O'Driscoll is the sixth-most-capped player in rugby union history, having played 141 test matches, 133 for Ireland (83 as captain), and 8 for the British and Irish Lions. He is the 8th-highest try scorer in international rugby union history, and the highest-scoring centre of all time. Danie Gerber played centre for South Africa during the apartheid era and even though he was only able to play 24 tests over 12 years, he scored 19 tries. Mike Gibson played for Ireland and the Lions; his record of 69 caps for Ireland lasted for 26 years. Tim Horan won two World Cups for Australia, being named the Player of the Tournament in 1999. As a player, Ian McGeechan won 32 caps for Scotland and went on two Lions tours, while as a coach he led the Lions a record four times. Welsh centre Gwyn Nicholls played from 1896 to 1906 and was known as the "Prince of Threequarters". Other centres in the International Rugby Hall of Fame are Jo Maso and Philippe Sella from France, known for their flamboyant attacking play. Gibson and Sella are also in the IRB Hall of Fame. Seven centres are in the IRB Hall but not the International Hall—Frank Hancock, a 19th-century Welsh player whose skills led to the creation of the modern two-centre formation; Guy Boniface, French international and younger brother of André; brothers Donald and Ian Campbell of Chile; Zimbabwe international Richard Tsimba; and Bleddyn Williams and Jack Matthews, who formed a legendary centre partnership for Cardiff and Wales in the era immediately following the Second World War.

Emily Scarratt played centre for England between 2008 and 2024, earning 119 caps and cementing her legacy as the highest point-scorer in women's international rugby history with 754 career test points. Gabrielle Vernier is a French international who earnt the Six Nations Player of the Championship award in 2023. Meg Jones is a midfielder who served as vice-captain during England's triumphant 2025 World Cup campaign before being appointed captain of the Red Roses in 2026.

=== Half-backs ===
==== Fly-half ====
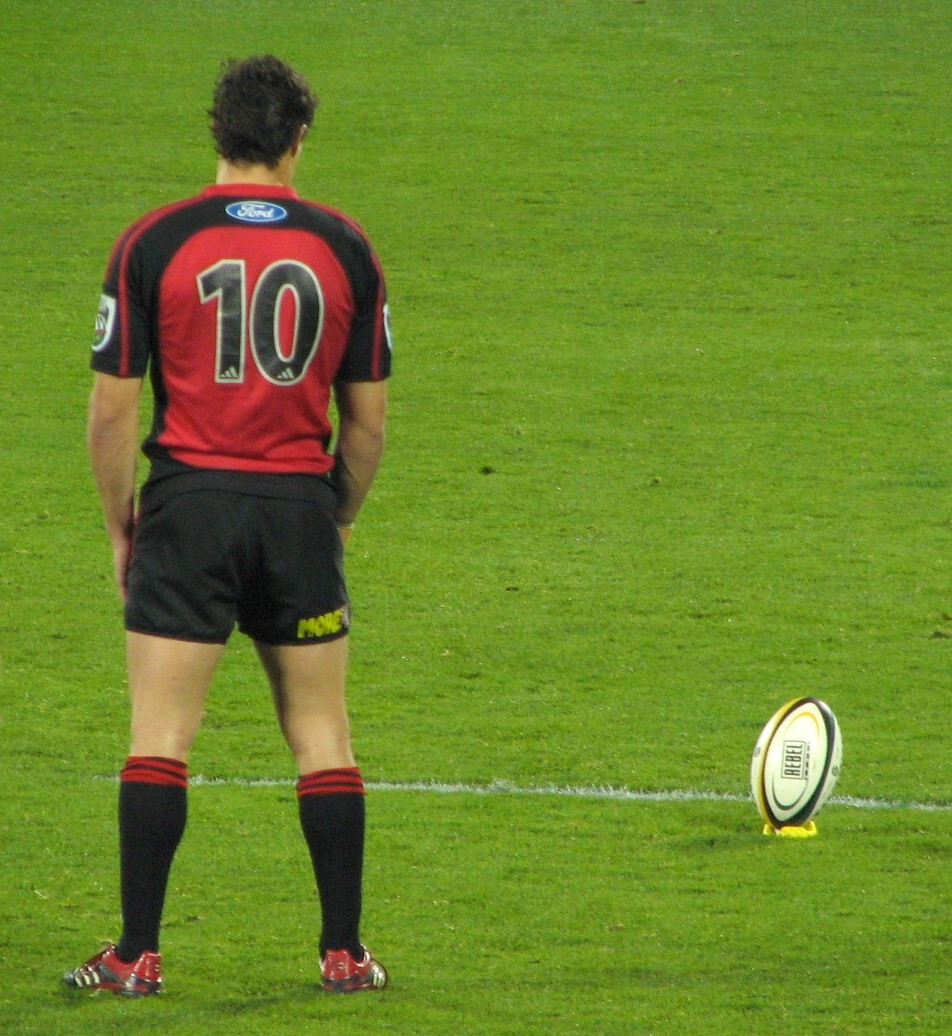
Fly-half Dan Carter lines up a kick at goal.

A fly-half (number 10) is usually the first player to receive the ball from the scrum-half following a breakdown, line-out or scrum. Therefore, they must be decisive with what actions to take. They must possess leadership and communicate effectively with the back line. Good fly-halves are calm, clear thinking and have the vision to direct effective attacking plays. Fly-halves need good passing and kicking skills. Often the fly-half is the best kicker in the team and needs to be able to execute attacking kicks such as up-and-unders, grubbers and chip kicks as well as being able to kick for territory. Many fly-halves are also the team's goal kickers.

Fly-halves in the International Rugby Hall of Fame include Cliff Morgan, as well as fellow Welshman Phil Bennett, the latter of whom unleashed two great sidesteps to set up what some have described as "the greatest try of all time". South African Naas Botha scored 312 points (including a record 17 drop goals) despite playing most of his career when the Springboks were boycotted. Australia's Mark Ella used his vision, passing skills and game management to orchestrate a new flat-back attacking style. Grant Fox was one of the most respected goal-kickers who scored more than 1,000 points in all matches for New Zealand. Barry John was known simply as "the king" to Welsh rugby fans and was rated third in the 1971 BBC Sports Personality of the Year Award. Jack Kyle is widely considered Ireland's greatest player. Michael Lynagh took over fly-half from Ella, and in his first test in that position scored an Australian record of 23 points against Canada. Bennie Osler played for South Africa from 1924 until 1933, during which he played a South African record of 17 consecutive games and scored a then world record of 14 points in one game against New Zealand. Hugo Porta is regarded as one of the finest players that Argentina has produced and has been a member of the Laureus World Sports Academy since 2000.

Of the players mentioned above, Ella, Kyle, Morgan, Osler and Porta are members of the IRB Hall of Fame. Four fly-halves are in the IRB Hall but not the International Hall. Gareth Rees of Canada played in all of the first four Rugby World Cups, and remains the country's all-time leading test points scorer. Kennedy Tsimba of Zimbabwe, younger brother of the aforementioned Richard, only played four times for his country, but was one of the world's top fly-halves in the early 21st century, twice being named the player of the year in South Africa's domestic Currie Cup. He was also the first black player to captain the Zimbabwe national team. Thomas Lawton, Snr, an Australian inducted in 2013, was one of the leading fly-halves of the 1920s and early 1930s.

==== Scrum-half ====
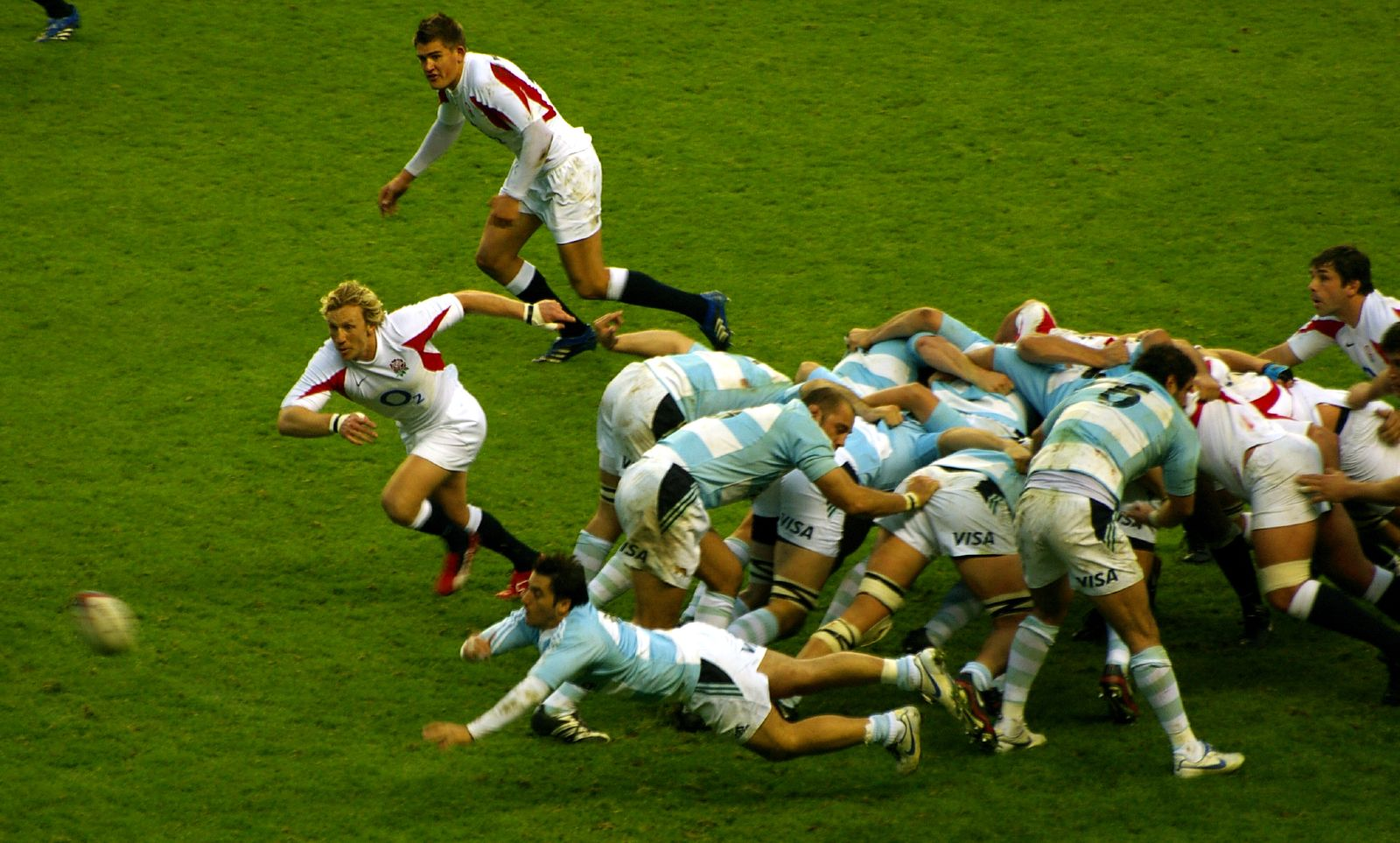
IRB Hall of Fame member Agustín Pichot passes the ball from the back of a scrum.

The scrum-half (number 9) is the link between the forwards and the backs. They receive the ball from the line-out and remove the ball from the back of the scrum, usually passing it to the fly-half. They also feed the scrum. Along with the fly-half, they make many of the tactical decisions on the field. During general play, the scrum-half is generally the player who receives the ball from the forwards and passes it to the backs. They are good communicators, especially at directing the forwards around, and their aim is to provide the backs with clean ball. Good scrum-halves have an excellent pass, a good tactical kick and are deceptive runners. At defensive scrums they put pressure on the opposition scrum-half or defend the blindside. On defence in open play they generally cover for deep kicks after the ball has been passed wide. Traditionally, scrum-halves have been the smallest players on the team, but many modern scrum-halves are a similar size to the other players in the team.

Five scrum-halves are members of the International Rugby Hall of Fame; four of them are also in the IRB Hall of Fame. Ken Catchpole of Australia was made captain on his debut at 21 in 1961, and went on to captain the Wallabies in nearly half of his 27 tests. Danie Craven from South Africa was one of the greatest scrum halves in the 1930s and a respected administrator of the South African Rugby Board. Gareth Edwards played for Wales and the British and Irish Lions during the 1970s and is regarded by many as the greatest player in history. Nick Farr-Jones captained Australia through their 1991 Rugby World Cup winning campaign; he was enshrined in the International Hall in 1999. When Joost van der Westhuizen retired in 2003, he had 89 caps, at the time the most for any South African. Of these players, only van der Westhuizen is not in the IRB Hall.

Three scrum-halves are in the IRB Hall but not the International Hall. New Zealander David Kirk, inducted in 2011, was captain of the All Blacks team that won the inaugural 1987 Rugby World Cup. Fellow 2011 inductee Agustín Pichot, who played in three World Cups for Argentina, is perhaps best known as the Pumas' captain during their surprise run to third place in the 2007 World Cup, which eventually led to their 2012 entry into The Rugby Championship, previously the Tri Nations. Australian George Gregan, inducted in 2013, retired from international rugby in 2007 with a then-world record 139 test caps, and also captained the Wallabies 59 times.

== Forwards ==
=== Back row (Loose forwards) ===
The back row (or loose forwards) consists of three players – two flankers, one on either side of the scrum; and a number eight at the back of the scrum.

==== Number eight ====
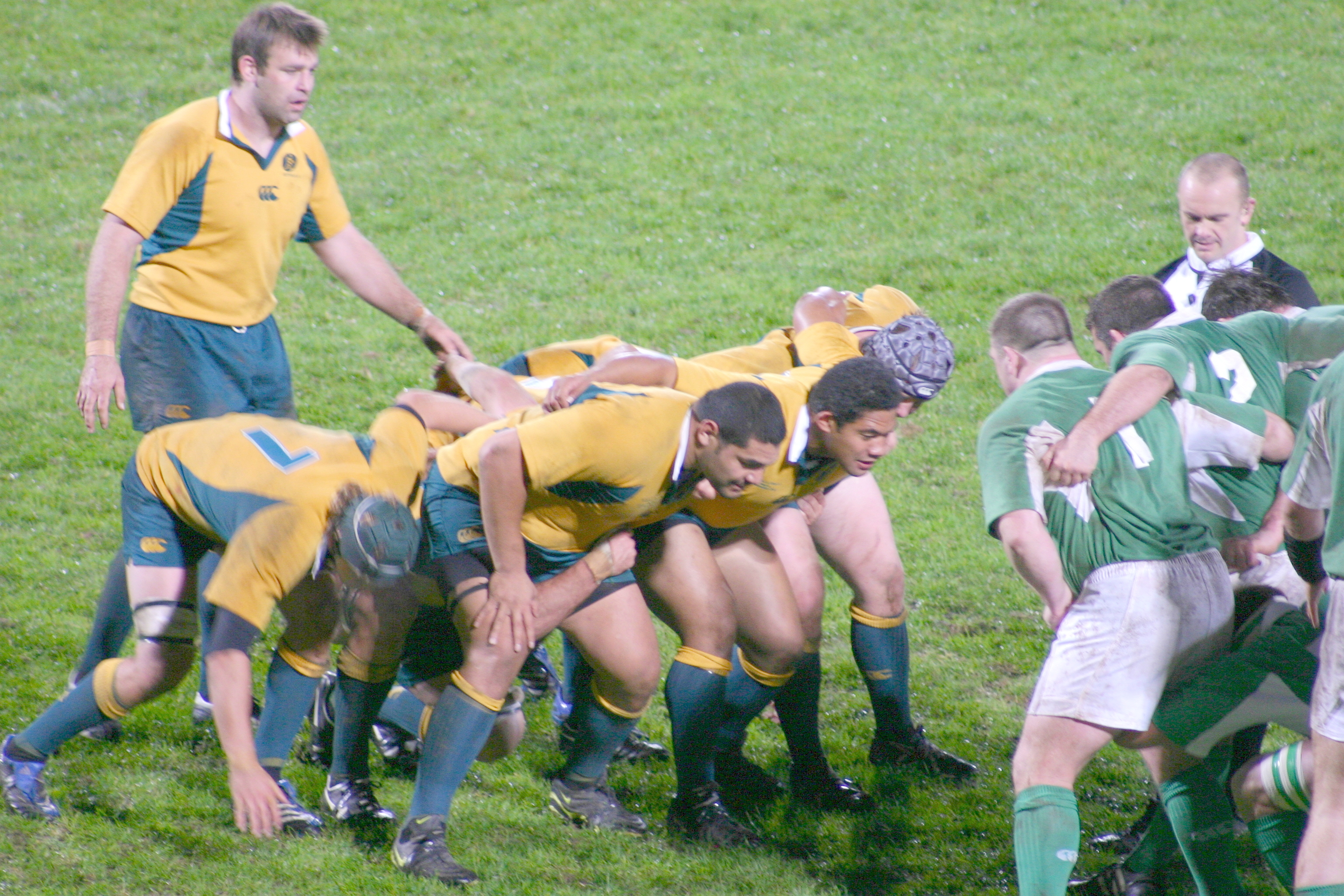
A scrum is preparing to engage. The front row consists of two props on either side of the hooker. The number eight can be seen standing up at the back, while the flankers are bound on the side.

The number eight, or eighthman in South Africa, usually binds between the locks at the back of the scrum, providing extra weight at the push. Number eights interact with the scrum-half at the back of the scrum to control and provide clean ball for the backs. They can also pick the ball from the back of the scrum and run with it or pass it to the scrum-half. At line-outs, they can be either another jumper or a lifter. Around the field, they have a similar set of responsibilities as the flankers at the breakdown. Number eights are often strong ball carriers and run off the backs in an attempt to break through or push past the opposition's defensive line.

Number eights in the International Rugby Hall of Fame include: Mervyn Davies (Wales and British and Irish Lions), Morne du Plessis (South Africa), Brian Lochore (New Zealand) and Hennie Muller (South Africa).

==== Flanker ====
The flanker's role is to tackle the opposition and try to steal the ball. The openside flanker (number 7) binds to the side of the scrum that covers the greatest area, while the blindside flanker (number 6) covers the side nearest the side-line. They bind loosely to the side of the scrum, but still play an important role in keeping the props tight by pushing at an angle. They should be the first forward to a breakdown from a scrum or line-out and are expected to link with the backline or secure the ball at the tackle. Both positions have a high workrate, meaning the players need to be fit, fast and good at reading the opposition's attacking plays.

During open play if they have not made the tackle they usually stand in the loose next to the ruck or maul. This allows them to arrive quickly at the next tackle. The blindside is generally the larger of the two and usually acts as a third jumping option at the line-out. The openside flanker is usually faster than the blindside, with good opensides excellent at turning over the ball at the tackle.

Flankers in the International Rugby Hall of Fame include: Dave Gallaher, Michael Jones, Ian Kirkpatrick, Graham Mourie (all New Zealand), Francois Pienaar (South Africa), Jean Prat (France), Jean-Pierre Rives (France), Fergus Slattery (Ireland and Lions), and Wavell Wakefield (England). Pienaar and Prat are also members of the IRB Hall of Fame.

=== Locks ===
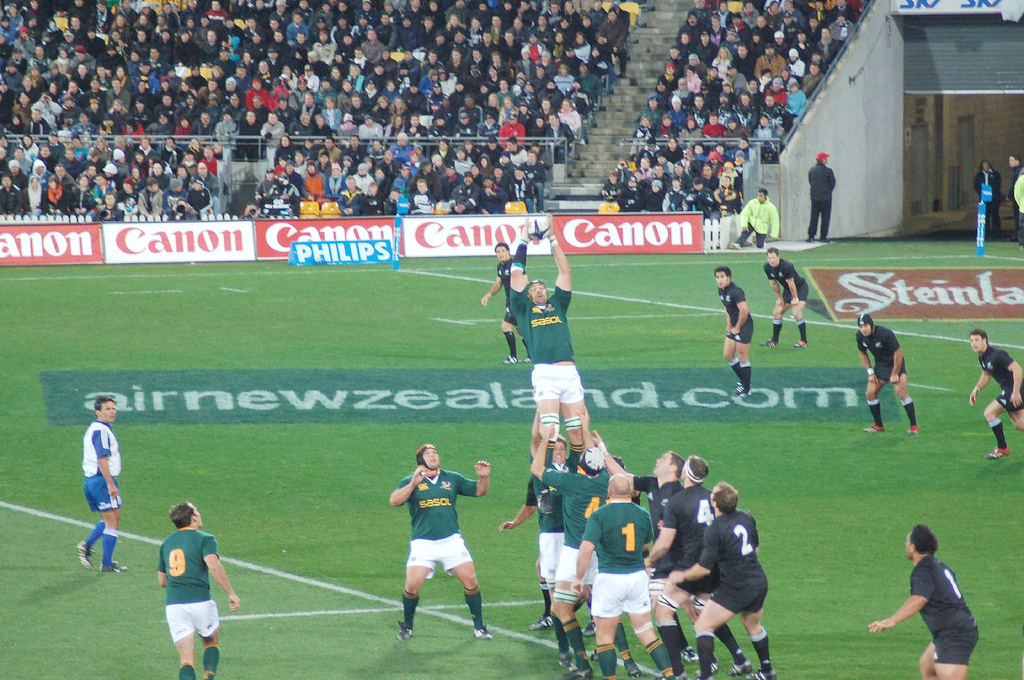
Locks jumping for a ball at a line-out

The locks form the second row, with the loosehead lock (number 4) on the left and the tighthead lock (number 5) on the right. They scrummage by pushing against the front row, thereby providing much of the power, and are commonly known as the engine room. They are almost always the tallest players in a team, and are the primary targets when the ball is thrown in at line-outs. Locks must also have good catching and tackling ability. At the line-out the locks are lifted and supported by teammates, allowing them to compete for the ball, either passing or tapping it to the scrumhalf or setting up a drive. In scrums the two locks bind tightly together, and each puts their head between a prop and the hooker. They compete for the kick-offs, and are involved in securing the ball in rucks and mauls. They commonly make short runs carrying the ball into contact (sometimes known as "crash balls").

Locks in the International Rugby Hall of Fame include: Bill Beaumont (England and Lions), Gordon Brown (Scotland and Lions), Frik du Preez (South Africa), John Eales (Australia), Martin Johnson (England and Lions), Brian Lochore (New Zealand), Willie John McBride (Ireland and Lions), and Colin Meads (New Zealand). Du Preez, Eales, Johnson and McBride are also members of the IRB Hall of Fame as players; Lochore was inducted into the IRB Hall primarily as a coach. Three locks are members of the IRB Hall of Fame but not the International Hall—Fairy Heatlie, a South African great of the era around 1900 who was also one of the first Argentina internationals; French international Lucien Mias; and early 20th-century Scottish international David Bedell-Sivright.

=== Front row ===
==== Prop ====
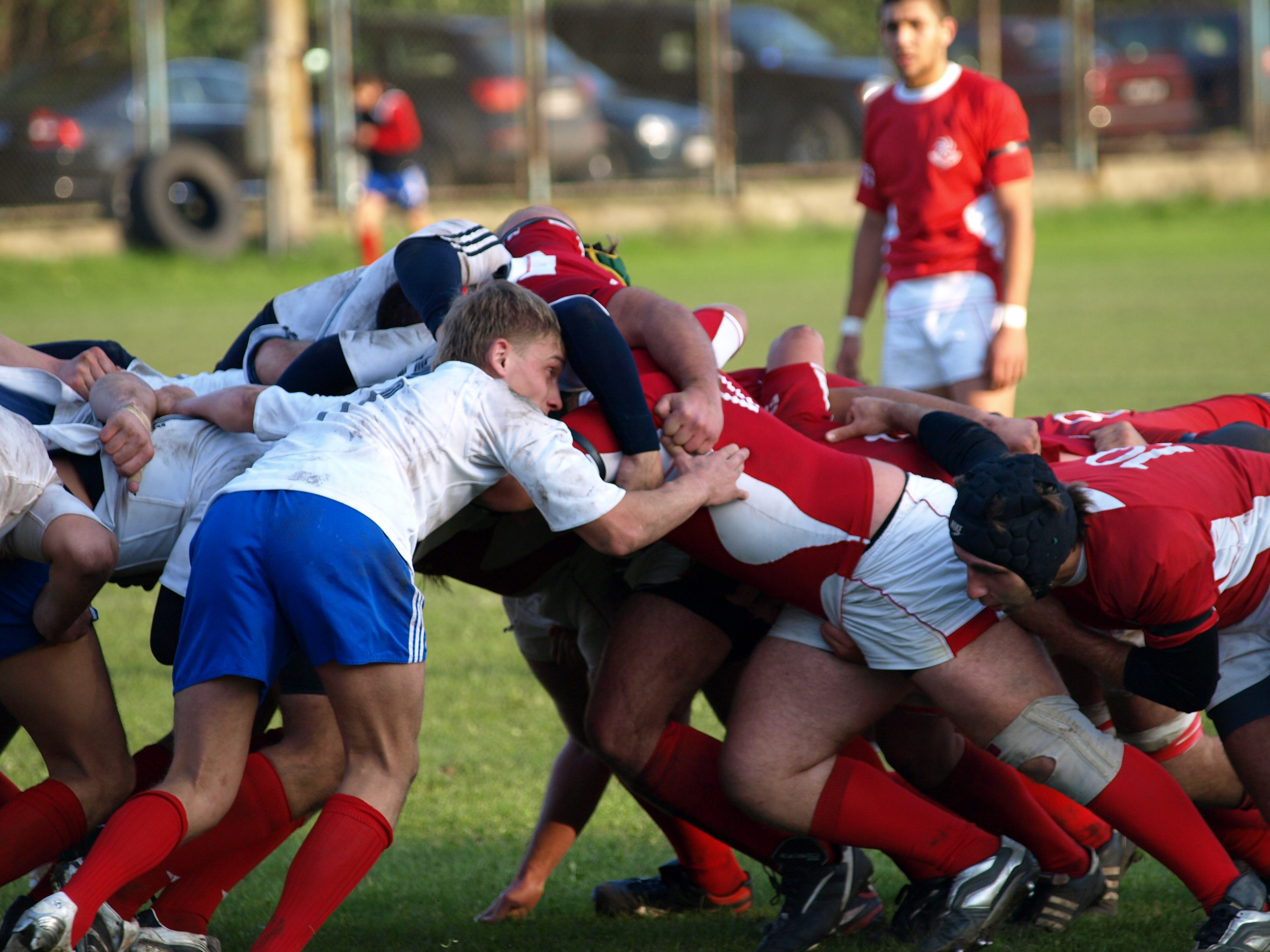
Opposing props attempt to gain the upper hand in the scrum.

The props "prop up" the hooker in the scrum. They form part of the front row of the scrum and push against the opposition's props. The loosehead prop (number 1) is positioned to the left of the hooker and their head will be on the outside of the scrum when it engages. The tighthead prop (number 3) is to the right of the hooker with their head positioned between the opposition hooker and the opposition loosehead prop. The prop's main role is to provide stability at the scrum and support the hooker in quickly winning the ball. At the line-out, the prop's role is to support the jumper as they compete for the ball. They are usually positioned at the front of the line-out with a jumper in between them. They are also often involved in lifting jumpers when receiving kick-offs. While scrummaging is still seen as their main responsibility, modern props are also expected to contribute in the attack and defence.

Props have to take in pressure from the locks and loose forwards pushing from behind and the opposition pushing against them, so they are often among the strongest players in a team. Some of the more successful props have short necks and broad shoulders to absorb this force as well as powerful legs to drive the scrum forward. Since the game has become professional, non-specialist props or hookers cannot play in the front row. If, through sendings-off or injuries, a team does not have enough specialist front row players, the scrums become 'uncontested' (i.e. no pushing is allowed and the team putting the ball into the scrum wins it). On their own scrum, the loosehead's role is to provide the hooker with a clear view to strike the ball, while the tighthead tries to keep the scrum stable. When the opposition is putting the ball in, the tighthead attempts to disrupt the opposing hooker or loosehead, making it difficult for them to win the ball.

Props in the International Rugby Hall of Fame include: Jason Leonard (England and Lions), Syd Millar (Ireland and Lions) and Wilson Whineray (New Zealand).

==== Hooker ====
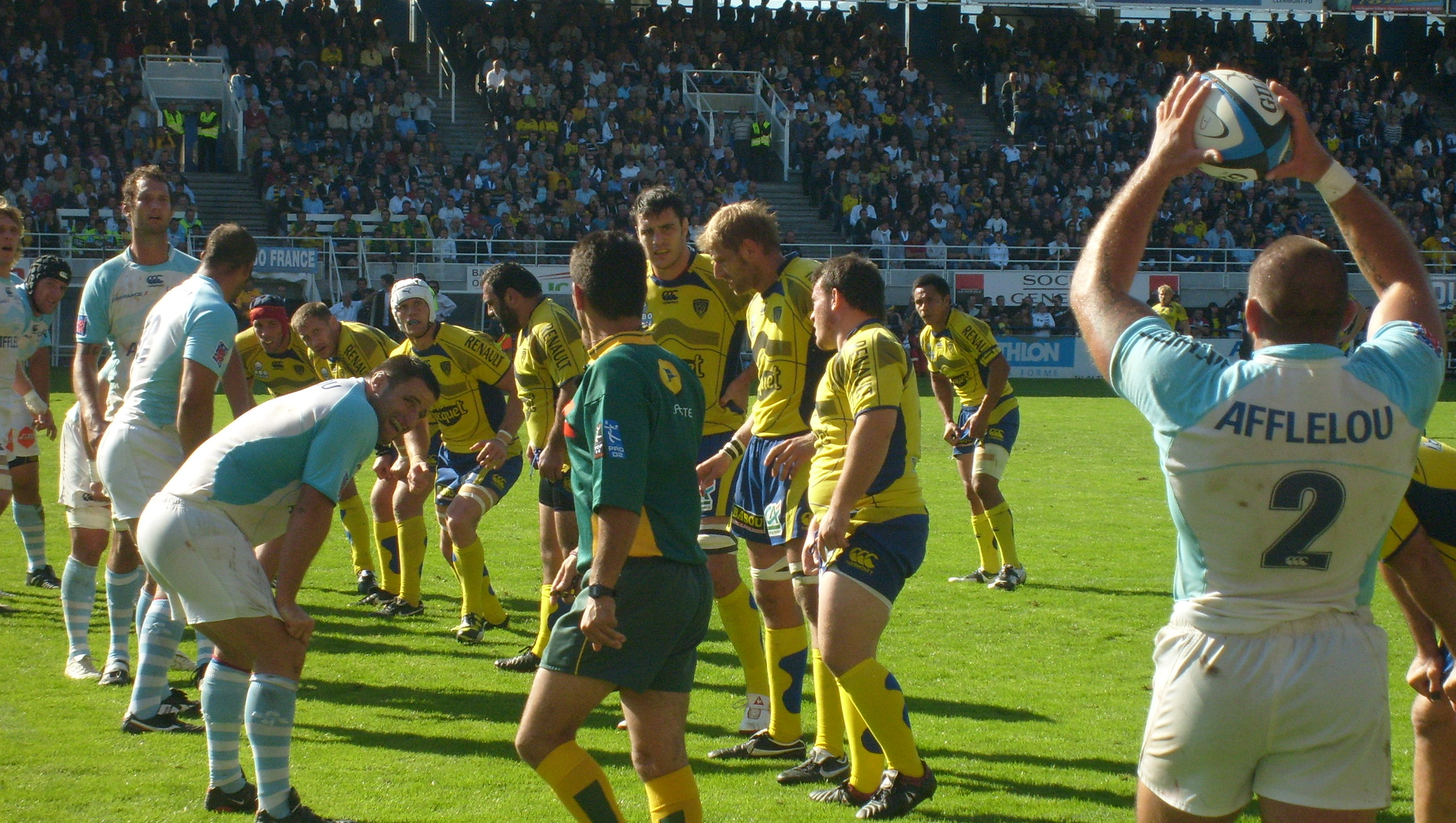
A hooker getting ready to throw the ball into a line-out

The hooker (number 2) is positioned between the two props in the scrum. After the scrumhalf throws the ball into the scrum, the hooker from the team which threw in the ball must strike for the ball. Any front-row player may use a foot to strike for the ball and gain possession. However, given the role of the props in keeping the scrum stable, it is usually one of the hookers who successfully "hooks" the ball back with the movement of a leg and foot coming into contact with the ball to win possession for their team. Hookers generally have a short back and long arms to aid in binding to the props. Hookers are usually more mobile than the props, and are often used to carry the ball up during open play. Only specialist front-row players can play hooker; if a team cannot field one for any reason, the scrums will become uncontested. In addition to their role in the scrum, hookers generally throw the ball into the line-out.

Hookers in the International Rugby Hall of Fame include: Sean Fitzpatrick (New Zealand) and Keith Wood (Ireland and Lions). Two hookers are members of the IRB Hall. John Smit of South Africa, captain of the World Cup-winning Springboks in 2007, was inducted in 2011. Ronnie Dawson of Ireland and the Lions was inducted in 2013. He earned 27 caps for Ireland and appeared 17 times for the Lions from 1958 to 1965, captaining the Lions in six tests; after his playing career ended, he became the first head coach of Ireland and still later served as president of the IRFU and chairman of the IRB Council.

== Utility players ==
Players who have the ability to play a number of positions in a team are called utility players. Utility players can be seen as "Jack of all trades" and they generally occupy the reserve position in a team. For this reason, many try to avoid being labelled as utilities. Players in the forward positions are generally more specialised than those that play in the backs. However, flankers can usually play number eight, and many players can play lock as well as a back-row position. The front row positions are usually very specialised, although some props can play both sides or even hooker. South Africa captain and IRB Hall of Fame member John Smit has played test matches in every front row position. Another IRB Hall of Fame member to have played multiple forward positions is John Thornett, an Australian utility forward who played at flanker, number 8, lock and prop for the Wallabies from 1955 to 1967.

Utility backs tend to cover a greater number of positions, with players commonly switching between scrum-half and fly-half, fly-half and centre, or wing and full-back. Another famous utility player was Austin Healey, who started and played test matches for England and club matches for Leicester Tigers at fly half, scrum-half, full-back and winger. Among members of the International Rugby or IRB Halls of Fame, Mike Gibson has 28 caps at fly-half, 48 at centre and 4 on the wing, and Tim Horan played 62 tests at centre, 2 on the wing and 9 at full-back. Danie Craven mostly played at half-back, but has also started a test in the forwards at number 8. Matt Giteau has also shown great versatility throughout his career, playing 6 tests at scrum-half, 46 at fly-half, 50 at centre and one on the wing. 2013 IRB Hall inductee Waisale Serevi, although most famous as a sevens player and primarily a fly-half in 15s, also started tests as a scrum-half, full-back and wing, and came off the bench once as a centre and once as an emergency lock.

An example of a player changing from playing a position in the forwards to one in the backs was Richie Vernon, who began his career as a flanker or number 8 before transitioning successfully into an outside centre. He represented Scotland at Test level in both roles, before retiring in 2019.

== Rugby sevens ==
Rugby sevens teams have only seven players on the field and can nominate five substitutes. The seven players are split into three forwards and four backs. Scrums are formed with three players who bind together the same as the front row. There are four backs: scrum-half, fly-half, centre, and wing. The scrum-half feeds the ball into the scrum. The other three players form the backline. Since play is much more open in sevens, with rucks and mauls generally kept to a minimum, most sevens players are backs or loose forwards in fifteen-a-side teams.

When a team is defending in open play or from a penalty kick, the defending team will often play a line of six defenders across the field, with one player deeper known as the "sweeper" whose role is to field kicks or to tackle attacking players who have broken through the defensive line.

== See also ==
- List of rugby union players by country
- Rugby league positions
- Rugby union numbering schemes

== Bibliography ==
- Brown, Mathew; Guthrie, Patrick; Growden, Greg (2010). Rugby For Dummies. John Wiley and Sons.
- Biscombe, Tony; Drewett, Peter (2009). Rugby: Steps to Success. Human Kinetics.
- Bompa, Tudor; Claro, Frederick (2008). Periodization in Rugby. Meyer and Meyer Sport.
- Collins, Tony (2009). A Social History of English Rugby Union. Routledge. ISBN 978-0-415-47660-7.
- Laws of the game: Rugby Union (PDF). International Rugby Board. 2011. ISBN 978-1-907506-09-3. Archived from the original (PDF) on 3 March 2011.
