= Ranfurly Shield 2010–2019 =

New Zealand rugby union trophy

Ranfurly Shield
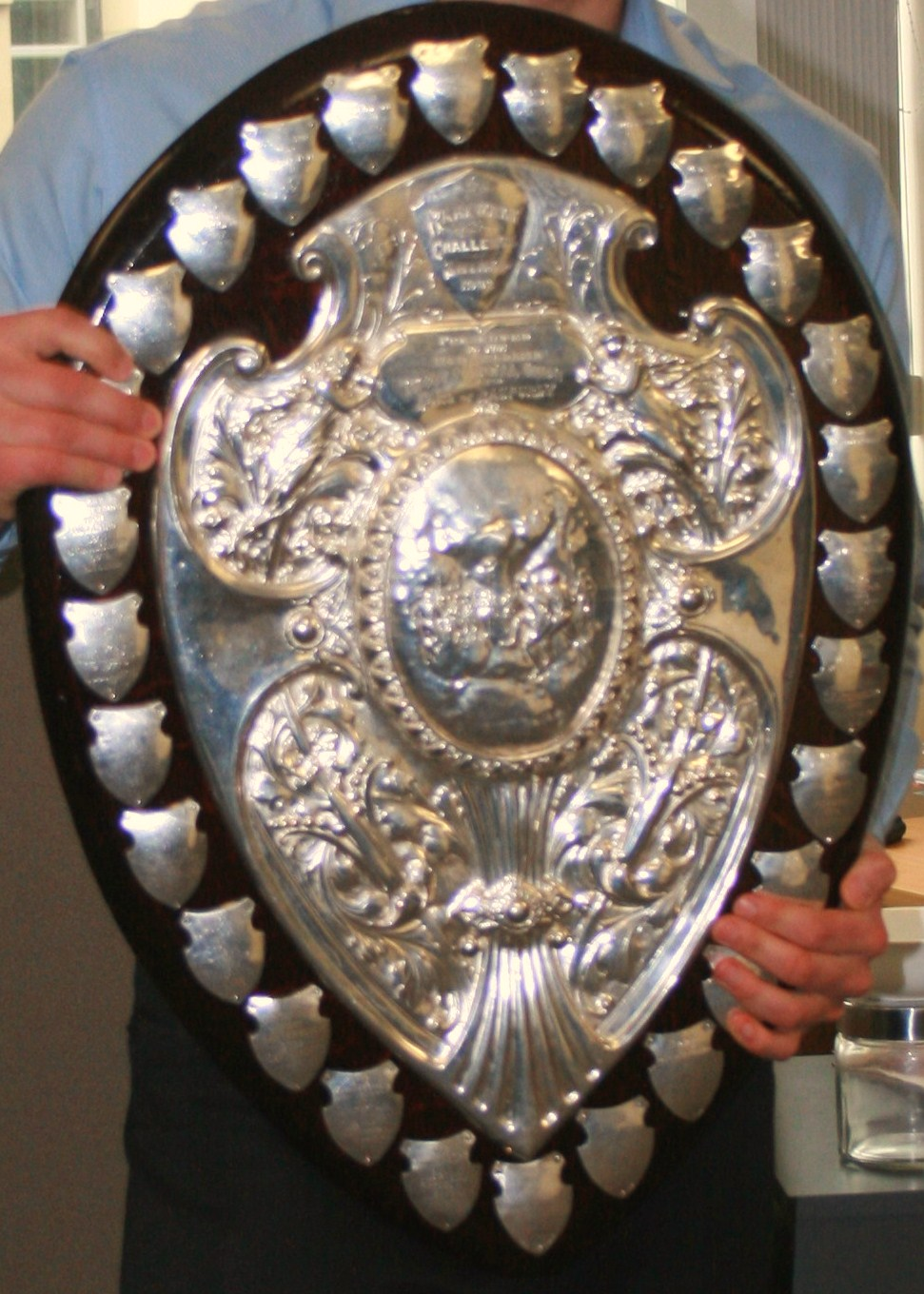
- Countries: New Zealand
- Champions: Canterbury
- Matches played: 78
- Top point scorer: Ihaia West (158)
- Top try scorer: Ryan Tongia (12)

Official website
- www.mitre10cup.co.nz/Competition/RanfurlyShield

The Ranfurly Shield, colloquially known as the Log o' Wood, is perhaps the most prestigious trophy in New Zealand's domestic rugby union competition. First played for in 1904, it is based on a challenge system, rather than a league or knockout competition, as with most football trophies. The holding union must defend the Shield in challenge matches, and if a challenger defeats them, they become the new holder of the Shield.

Canterbury won the Shield from Otago in a 35–25 victory on 5 October 2019.

== Holders ==
Key
*	Held Ranfurly Shield at the end of the decade

Team	Won	Successful defences
Southland	Held at beginning of decade	6
Canterbury	9 October 2010	2
Southland	23 July 2011	2
Taranaki	24 August 2011	7
Waikato	3 October 2012	4
Otago	23 August 2013	0
Hawke's Bay	1 September 2013	0
Counties Manukau	7 September 2013	6
Hawke's Bay	30 August 2014	11
Waikato	9 October 2015	6
Canterbury	28 September 2016	7
Taranaki	6 October 2017	4
Waikato	9 September 2018	2
Otago	13 October 2018	5
Canterbury*	5 October 2019	1

Team	Wins	Successful defences	Average defences
Waikato	3	13	4.33
Hawke's Bay	2	11	5.5
Taranaki	2	11	5.5
Canterbury*	3	10	3.3
Otago	2	5	2.5
Southland	1 (Note: As Southland initially won the Shield in 2009, i.e. not the decade of 2010–19, only their win in 2011 counts towards this table.)	8	4
Counties Manukau	1	6	6

== Fixtures ==
=== 2010 ===
9 July 2010	Southland	48–3	North Otago	Rugby Park, Invercargill
19:35 (NZST)	Try: James Wilson; Joe Tuineau; James Patterson; Elliot Dixon; Mark Wells; Jamie Mackintosh; Glen Horton; Con: James Wilson (5/6); Pen: James Wilson (1)	Report	Pen: Ben Patston

23 July 2010	Southland	62–6	Wanganui	Rugby Park, Invercargill
19:35 (NZST)	Try: Mark Wells (2); Glen Horton (2); Tony Koonwaiyou (2); Elliot Dixon; Brayden Mitchell; Jamie Mackintosh; Jason Rutledge; Con: Robbie Robinson (6/10)	Report	Pen: Mark Davis; Drop: Mark Davis; Cards: Nic Cranston (yellow card)

7 August 2010	Southland	16–12	Otago	Rugby Park, Invercargill
16:35 (NZST)	Try: Jamie Mackintosh; Con: James Wilson (1/1); Pen: Robbie Robinson (2); James Wilson	Report	Pen: Glenn Dickson (3); Drop: Glenn Dickson

14 August 2010	Southland	13–9	Counties Manukau	Rugby Park, Invercargill
17:30 (NZST)	Try: Jason Rutledge; Con: Robbie Robinson; Pen: Robbie Robinson; Drop: Robbie Robinson	Report	Pen: Baden Kerr (3)

10 September 2010	Southland	47–21	North Harbour	Rugby Park, Invercargill
19:35 (NZST)	Try: Matt Saunders; Jamie Mackintosh; Scott Cowan; Glenn Horton; Kendrick Lynn (2); Con: Robbie Robinson (6/6)	Results	Try: Nafi Tuitavake; Mike Harris; Malaki Ravulo; Con: Mike Harris (3/3)

23 September 2010	Southland	9–6	Auckland	Rugby Park, Invercargill
19:35 (NZST)	Pen: Robbie Robinson (3)	Results	Pen: Matt Berquist (2)

9 October 2010	Southland	15–26	Canterbury	Rugby Park, Invercargill
19:35 (NZST)	Try: Kane Thompson; Con: Robbie Robinson (1/1); Pen: Robbie Robinson (2); James Wilson (1)	Report	Try: Telusa Veainu; Colin Slade; Con: Colin Slade; Pen: Colin Slade

16 October 2010	Canterbury	39–21	Counties Manukau	AMI Stadium, Christchurch
17:30 (NZST)	Try: Robbie Fruean; Sonny Bill Williams; Telusa Veainu; Owen Franks; Penalty try Con: Stephen Brett (4/5); Pen: Stephen Brett (2)	Report	Try: Sileki Nabou; Sherwin Stowers; Ahsee Tuala; Con: Dean Cummings (3/3)

=== 2011 ===
2 July 2011	Canterbury	52–8	North Otago	AMI Stadium, Christchurch
	Try: Johnny McNicholl (2); Ash Parker; Brendon O'Connor; Willie Heinz; Kolio Hifo; Patrick Osborne; Tom Taylor; Con: Colin Slade (3); Tom Taylor (3)	Report	Try: Rob Mafileo; Pen: Ben Patston

23 July 2011	Canterbury	19–22	Southland	AMI Stadium, Christchurch
14:35 (NZST)	Try: Patrick Osborne 8'; Sean Maitland 20'; Pen: Tom Taylor (3) 13', 28', 69'	Report	Try: Scott Cowan 60'; Con: James Wilson (1/1) 61'; Pen: James Wilson (4/5) 10', 18', 32', 57'; Drop: James Wilson 77'	Referee: Jonathon White

29 July 2011	Southland	22–14	Counties Manukau	Rugby Park, Invercargill
18:05 (NZST)	Try: Josh Bekhuis 37'; Con: James Wilson (1/1) 37'; Pen: James Wilson (5/6) 13', 28', 47', 64', 75'	Results	Try: Grant Henson 72'; Pen: Tasesa Lavea (2/2) 5', 18'; James Semple (1/1) 52'	Referee: Glen Jackson

13 August 2011	Southland	25–23	North Harbour	Rugby Park, Invercargill
14:35 (NZST)	Try: Tim Cornforth 2'; Scott Cowan 43', 80'; Con: James Wilson (2/3) 3', 80'; Pen: James Wilson (2/2) 59', 71'	Result	Try: James Parsons 5'; Irwin Finau 10'; Con: Ben Botica (2/2) 6', 12'; Pen: Ben Botica (3/3) 20', 40', 56'	Referee: Chris Pollock

24 August 2011	Southland	12–15	Taranaki	Rugby Park, Invercargill
20:05 (NZST)	Pen: James Wilson (4/5) 2', 21', 51', 74'	Report	Pen: Beauden Barrett (5/7) 6', 31', 38', 49', 65'	Referee: Nick Briant

28 August 2011	Taranaki	29–11	Hawke's Bay	Yarrow Stadium, New Plymouth
16:35 (NZST)	Try: Frazier Climo 28'; Jayden Hayward 48'; Con: Beauden Barrett (2/2) 29', 49'; Pen: Beauden Barrett (5/5) 6', 19', 35', 63', 70'	Results	Try: Richard Buckman 60'; Pen: Andrew Horrell (2/2) 4', 42'	Referee: Mike Fraser

=== 2012 ===
27 July 2012	Taranaki	67–16	King Country	Inglewood
	Try: Waisake Naholo (2); Jack Cameron; Jayden Hayward; Willie Rickards; James Marshall; Avon Lewis; Kurt Baker (2); Berny Hall; Con: Jack Cameron (7/10); Pen: Jack Cameron (1)	Report	Try: Paul Olsen; Con: Kurt Strachan (1/1); Pen: Kurt Strachan (3)

4 August 2012	Taranaki	51–7	Wanganui	Yarrow Stadium, New Plymouth
	Try: Unknown; Con: Unknown; Pen: Unknown	Result	Try: Baldwin; Con: Davis (1/1)	Referee: Nick Briant

1 September 2012	Taranaki	49–40	Tasman	Yarrow Stadium, New Plymouth
19:35 (NZST)	Try: Blade Thomson 1'; Kurt Baker 8', 25'; Waisake Naholo 18'; Beauden Barrett 79'; Con: Beauden Barrett (3/5) 2', 9', 18'; Pen: Beauden Barrett (6/7) 7', 37', 44', 46', 49', 57'	Results	Try: James Lowe 5'; Campbell Johnstone 22'; Tim Perry 32'; Quentin MacDonald 41'; Robbie Malneek 60'; Con: Andrew Goodman (3/5) 5', 23', 32'; Pen: Andrew Goodman (3/3) 11', 30', 38'; Cards: Vernon Fredericks (yellow card) 56'	Referee: Glen Jackson

7 September 2012	Taranaki	22–6	Hawke's Bay	Yarrow Stadium, New Plymouth
18:05 (NZST)	Try: Kurt Baker 42'; Jayden Hayward 67'; Scott Waldrom 78'; Con: Jack Cameron (2/2) 68', 79'; Pen: Jack Cameron (1/1) 63'	Report	Pen: Daniel Waenga (2/5) 44', 58'	Referee: Keith Brown

15 September 2012	Taranaki	18–9	Canterbury	Yarrow Stadium, New Plymouth
14:35 (NZST)	Try: James Marshall 33'; Scott Waldrom 76'; Con: Frazier Climo (1/1) 34'; Pen: Frazier Climo (1/5) 6'; Jack Cameron (1/1) 68'	Results	Pen: Tyler Bleyendaal (3/6) 14', 39', 47'	Referee: Garratt Williamson

29 September 2012	Taranaki	59–18	Manawatu	Yarrow Stadium, New Plymouth
14:35 (NZST)	Try: Andre Taylor 11'; Kurt Baker (3) 21', 47', 57'; Frazier Climo (2) 67', 69'; Jackson Ormond 74'; Willie Rickards 78'; Con: Frazier Climo (4/6) 12', 22', 48', 58'; Andre Taylor (1/2) 78'; Pen: Frazier Climo (3/4) 7', 27', 36'	Results	Try: Craig Clare 23'; Reece Robinson 53'; Con: Craig Clare (1/2) 24'; Pen: Craig Clare (2/2) 10', 43'	Referee: Mike Fraser

3 October 2012	Taranaki	10–46	Waikato	Yarrow Stadium, New Plymouth
19:35 (NZST)	Try: Jamison Gibson-Park 60'; Con: Frazier Climo (1/1) 61'; Pen: Frazier Climo (1/2) 8'	Report	Try: Marcel Cummings-Toone 3'; Trent Renata 11'; Sam Christie 18'; Alex Bradley 36'; Tim Mikkelson (3) 44', 49', 79'; Con: Trent Renata (4/7) 12', 19', 50', 79'; Pen: Trent Renata (1/2) 26'; Cards: Tawera Kerr-Barlow (yellow card) 58'	Referee: Bryce Lawrence

13 October 2012	Waikato	28–3	Hawke's Bay	Waikato Stadium, Hamilton
17:35 (NZST)	Try: Alex Bradley 30'; Declan O'Donnell 50'; Savenaca Tokula 61'; Con: Trent Renata (2/3) 31', 51'; Pen: Trent Renata (3/4) 18', 25', 39'	Results	Pen: Andrew Horrell (1/1) 29'; Cards: Maselino Paulino (yellow card) 46'	Referee: Jonathon White

=== 2013 ===
18 July 2013	Waikato	85–0	Horowhenua-Kapiti	Campbell Park, Morrinsville
18:00 (NZST)	Try: Whetu Douglas 2'; Joe Webber (4); Brendon Leonard; Dylan Collier (2); Romana Graham; Brian Alainu'uese; Glen Robertson (2); Hame Faiva; Con: Trent Renata (6); Wharenui Hawera (1); Dylan Collier (1)	Report		Attendance: 3,000

30 July 2013	East Coast	10–65	Waikato	Whakarua Park, Ruatoria
18:00 (NZST)		Report

17 August 2013	Waikato	31–22	Northland	Waikato Stadium, Hamilton
19:35 (NZST)	Try: Rory Grice 15'; Joe Webber 25'; Toby Smith 74'; Con: Trent Renata (2/3) 16', 75'; Pen: Trent Renata (4/5) 12', 32', 45', 66'	Results	Try: Sonatane Takulua 42'; Con: Ben Seymour (1/1) 43'; Pen: Ben Seymour (5/5) 18', 29', 36', 50', 68'	Referee: Jonathon White

23 August 2013	Waikato	19–26	Otago	Waikato Stadium, Hamilton
20:05 (NZST)	Try: Tim Mikkelson 36'; Con: Trent Renata (1/1) 37'; Pen: Trent Renata (4/4) 6', 19', 50', 55'	Report	Try: Hayden Parker 24'; TJ Ioane 63'; Con: Hayden Parker (2/2) 25', 64'; Pen: Hayden Parker (4/4) 12', 15', 31', 58'	Referee: Glen Jackson

1 September 2013	Otago	19–20	Hawke's Bay	Forsyth Barr Stadium, Dunedin
16:35 (NZST)	Try: Jayden Spence 61'; Buxton Popoali'i 73'; Pen: Hayden Parker (3/4) 13', 16', 36'	Report	Try: Telusa Veainu 32'; Ihaia West 57'; Con: Ihaia West (2/2) 33', 58'; Pen: Ihaia West (2/3) 31', 38'	Referee: Mike Fraser

7 September 2013	Hawke's Bay	24–27	Counties Manukau	McLean Park, Napier
16:35 (NZST)	Try: Gillies Kaka 15'; Mark Atkins 52'; Con: Ihaia West (1/2) 16'; Pen: Ihaia West (4/5) 26', 30', 36', 68'	Report	Try: Sherwin Stowers 11'; Sean Reidy 69'; Sikeli Nabou 74'; Pen: Baden Kerr (4/4) 6', 21', 32', 43'	Referee: Jonathon White

15 September 2013	Counties Manukau	44–7	Taranaki	ECOLight Stadium, Pukekohe
14:35 (NZST)	Try: Hika Elliot 3'; Jimmy Tupou 8'; Frank Halai (2) 25', 42'; Kane Hancy 73'; Rey Lee-Lo 74'; Con: Baden Kerr (3/4) 5', 27', 43'; Ahsee Tuala (1/2) 75'; Pen: Baden Kerr (2/3) 12', 29'	Results	Try: Carl Carmichael 48'; Con: Beaudein Waaka (1/1) 49'	Referee: Nick Briant

21 September 2013	Counties Manukau	37–25	Waikato	ECOLight Stadium, Pukekohe
14:35 (NZST)	Try: Sherwin Stowers 10'; Augustine Pulu 31'; Fritz Lee 47'; Toni Pulu 58'; Con: Baden Kerr (4/4) 11', 32', 48', 59'; Pen: Baden Kerr (3/5) 23', 39', 52'; Cards: Augustine Pulu (yellow card) 75'	Results	Try: Trent Renata 5'; Rory Grice 49'; Sam Christie 55'; Con: Trent Renata (2/3) 50', 56'; Pen: Trent Renata (2/2) 14', 35'; Cards: Paul Alo-Emile (yellow card) 61'	Referee: Chris Pollock

11 October 2013	Counties Manukau	25–7	Southland	ECOLight Stadium, Pukekohe
19:35 (NZST)	Try: Ronald Raaymakers 7'; Fritz Lee 11'; Ahsee Tuala 36'; Con: Baden Kerr (2/3) 8', 37'; Pen: Baden Kerr (2/3) 34', 72'	Results	Try: Robbie Robinson 58'; Con: Scott Eade (1/1) 59'	Referee: Mike Fraser

=== 2014 ===
2 July 2014	Counties Manukau	68–0	Thames Valley	ECOLight Stadium, Pukekohe
18:00 (NZST)	Try: Jared Page (3); Maama Vaipulu (2); Kane Hancy; Toni Pulu; Karl Ropati; Luke Graham; Penalty try Con: Jared Page (6/10); Pen: Jared Page (2/2)	Report	Cards: Aaron MacDonald (yellow card)

9 July 2014	Counties Manukau	46–10	Mid Canterbury	ECOLight Stadium, Pukekohe
18:00 (NZST)	Try: Dan Hyatt (2); Jared Page; Maama Vaipulu; John Tu'ugafasi; Toni Pulu; Andy Muirhead; Con: Jared Page (4/6); Pen: Jared Page (1/1)	Report	Try: Jon Sharpe; Con: Murray Williams (1/1); Pen: Murray Williams (1)

23 August 2014	Counties Manukau	29–25	Otago	ECOLight Stadium, Pukekohe
16:35 (NZST)	Try: Daniel Hyatt 13'; Ronald Raaymakers 26'; Jordan Taufua 49'; Michael Stanley 65'; Con: Ahsee Tuala (3/3) 14', 27', 50'; Pen: Michael Stanley (1/1) 75'	Report	Try: Liam Coltman 8'; Aki Seiuli 72'; Fa'asiu Fuatai 77'; Con: Hayden Parker (2/3) 9', 73'; Pen: Hayden Parker (2/3) 16', 52'	Referee: Nick Briant

30 August 2014	Counties Manukau	21–27	Hawke's Bay	ECOLight Stadium, Pukekohe
14:35 (NZST)	Try: Onosai Auva'a 48'; Augustine Pulu 58'; Con: Tim Nanai-Williams (1/2) 49'; Pen: Ahsee Tuala (2/3) 10', 20'; Tim Nanai-Williams (1/1) 37'	Report	Try: Brendon O'Connor (2) 17', 27'; Chris Eaton 34'; Ryan Tongia 66'; Con: Ihaia West (2/4) 28', 67'; Pen: Ihaia West (1/1) 40'	Referee: Mike Fraser

14 September 2014	Hawke's Bay	41–0	Otago	McLean Park, Napier
16:35 (NZST)	Try: Ryan Tongia (2) 1', 5'; Brendon O'Connor 8'; Shannan Chase 25'; Richard Buckman 33'; Jason Long 73'; Con: Ihaia West (4/6) 7', 9', 26', 74'; Pen: Ihaia West (1/1) 49'	Report		Referee: Garratt Williamson

20 September 2014	Hawke's Bay	36–17	Bay of Plenty	McLean Park, Napier
14:35 (NZST)	Try: Michael Allardice 32'; Ihaia West (2) 42', 70'; Ryan Tongia (2) 63', 80'; Con: Ihaia West (1/3) 43'; Pen: Ihaia West (3/3) 16', 22', 28'	Report	Try: Maritino Nemani 67'; Jesse Acton 74'; Con: Nick Evemy (2/2) 68', 74'; Pen: Nick Evemy (1/2) 25'; Cards: Culum Retallick (yellow card) 31'; Maritino Nemani (red card) 77'	Referee: Kane McBride

1 October 2014	Hawke's Bay	36–14	Wellington	McLean Park, Napier
19:35 (NZST)	Try: Gareth Evans 13'; Brendon O'Connor 39'; Ryan Tongia (2) 44', 65'; Tony Lamborn 49'; Con: Ihaia West (4/5) 14', 40', 44', 50'; Pen: Matt Berquist (1/1) 77'	Report	Try: Matt Proctor 72'; Pen: Willie Ripia (3/3) 10', 15', 21'; Cards: Vaea Fifita (yellow card) 37'	Referee: Glen Jackson

11 October 2014	Hawke's Bay	20–20	Southland	McLean Park, Napier
17:35 (NZST)	Try: Shannan Chase (2) 36', 38'; Con: Ihaia West (2/2) 37', 39'; Pen: Ihaia West (1/2) 28'; Drop: Ihaia West 79'	Report	Try: Junior Ngaluafe 9'; Lima Sopoaga 30'; Con: Lima Sopoaga (2/2) 10', 31'; Pen: Lima Sopoaga (2/4) 62', 74'	Referee: Ben O'Keeffe

=== 2015 ===
9 July 2015	Hawke's Bay	58–7	Wairarapa Bush	McLean Park, Napier
14:35 (NZST)	Try: Zac Guildford (2); Jarvy Aoake; Shannan Chase; Billy Ropiha; Tyrone Elkington-MacDonald; Brendon O'Connor; Jonah Lowe; Con: Tyrone Elkington-MacDonald (5); Ihaia West; Pen: Tyrone Elkington-MacDonald (2)	Report	Try: Brock Price; Con: Tim Priest (1/1)	Referee: Jamie Nutbrown

16 July 2015	Hawke's Bay	50–16	Horowhenua-Kapiti	McLean Park, Napier
19:35 (NZST)	Try: Joseph Penitito (2); Tony Lamborn; Shannan Chase; Tom Stanley; Mark Braidwood; Con: Tyrone Elkington-MacDonald (4); Pen: Tyrone Elkington-MacDonald (4)	Report	Try: Sam Gardner; Con: Perry Hayman (1/1); Pen: Perry Hayman (3)	Referee: Paul Williams

23 July 2015	Hawke's Bay	57–12	Mid Canterbury	McLean Park, Napier
19:35 (NZST)	Try: Jonah Lowe (2); Shannan Chase; Tony Lamborn; Brendon O'Connor; Zac Guildford; Ryan Tongia; Con: Ihaia West (5); Pen: Tyrone Elkington-MacDonald (3); Ihaia West	Report	Pen: Murray Williams (4)	Referee: Brendon Pickerill

16 August 2015	Hawke's Bay	39–10	Northland	McLean Park, Napier
16:35 (NZST)	Try: Tony Lamborn (2) 3', 48'; Michael Allardice 18'; Ash Dixon 24'; Ryan Tongia (2) 40', 53'; Con: Ihaia West (3/6) 4', 25', 54'; Pen: Ihaia West (1/2) 9'	Report	Try: Troy Gilbert 77'; Con: Daniel Hawkins (1/1) 78'; Pen: Daniel Hawkins (1/1) 30'	Referee: Shane McDermott

5 September 2015	Hawke's Bay	48–32	North Harbour	McLean Park, Napier
19:35 (NZST)	Try: Ryan Tongia 10'; Israel Dagg 22'; Richard Buckman 42'; Brendon O'Connor 51'; Ash Dixon 55'; Chris Eaton 77'; Con: Ihaia West (6/6) 11', 23', 43', 52', 56', 78'; Pen: Ihaia West (2/2) 3', 8'	Report	Try: Tevita Li (2) 14', 79'; Michael Little 26'; Jordan Manihera 67'; Penalty try 75'; Con: Daniel Halangahu (1/2) 27'; Matt McGahan (1/3) 76'; Pen: Daniel Halangahu (1/4) 39'	Referee: Glen Jackson

19 September 2015	Hawke's Bay	23–17	Bay of Plenty	McLean Park, Napier
14:35 (NZST)	Try: Ryan Tongia 16'; Tom Stanley 44'; Tony Lamborn 49'; Con: Ihaia West (1/3) 45'; Pen: Ihaia West (2/2) 35', 38'	Report	Try: Shahn Eru 25'; Nick Evemy 52'; Con: Nick Evemy (2/2) 26', 53'; Pen: Nick Evemy (1/3) 3'; Cards: Zak Hohneck (yellow card) 34'	Referee: Ben O'Keeffe

24 September 2015	Hawke's Bay	17–12	Auckland	McLean Park, Napier
19:35 (NZST)	Try: Brendon Edmonds 35'; Ihaia West 64'; Con: Ihaia West (2/2) 36', 65'; Pen: Ihaia West (1/2) 9'	Report	Pen: Simon Hickey (4/6) 3', 23', 28', 40'	Referee: Nick Briant

9 October 2015	Hawke's Bay	30–36	Waikato	McLean Park, Napier
19:35 (NZST)	Try: Ash Dixon 18'; Brendon O'Connor (2) 39', 80'; Lewis Marshall 78'; Con: Ihaia West (2/4) 40', 78'; Pen: Ihaia West (2/3) 13', 57'; Cards: Zac Guildford (yellow card) 22'	Report	Try: Anton Lienert-Brown 2'; Josh Hohneck 34'; Brad Weber (3) 49', 69', 72'; Con: Damian McKenzie (4/5) 3', 35', 50', 73'; Pen: Damian McKenzie (1/2) 24'; Cards: Ben Tameifuna (yellow card) 77'	Referee: Nick Briant

=== 2016 ===
6 June 2016	Thames Valley	13–83	Waikato	Paeroa Domain, Paeroa
	Try: Brett Ranga; Jone Koroinsagana; Pen: Josh O'Flaherty	Report	Try: Iliesa Tavuyara (3); Whetu Douglas (2); Atu Moli (2); Latu Talakai; Jake Ale; Jason Robertson; Hame Faiva; Sevu Reece; Murray Iti; Con: Jason Robertson (6); Matt Lansdown (3)

30 July 2016	King Country	0–55	Waikato	Bedford Park, Matamata
14:35 (NZST)		Report	Try: Brian Alainu'uese 11'; Hame Faiva (2); Jordan Trainor; Murray Iti 47'; Sevu Reece 74'; Matt Lansdown 78'; Tevita Taufuʻi 80'; Con: Jordan Trainor (6); Pen: Jordan Trainor

6 August 2016	Waikato	32–12	Wanganui	Memorial Park, Cambridge
14:35 (NZST)	Try: Iliesa Tavuyara; Tevita Taufuʻi; Jordan Trainor (2); Whetu Douglas; Steven Misa; Con: Jordan Trainor	Report	Try: Gavin Thornbury; Jamie Hughes; Con: Dane Whale

27 August 2016	Waikato	26–15	North Harbour	FMG Stadium Waikato, Hamilton
14:35 (NZST)	Try: Isaac Boss 1'; Loni Uhila 3'; Nathaniel Apa 17'; Epalahame Faiva 65'; Con: Jordan Trainor (3/4) 1', 19', 67'	Report	Try: Michael Little 29'; Bryn Hall 44'; Con: Bryn Gatland (1/2) 29'; Pen: Bryn Gatland (1/2) 32'	Referee: Mike Fraser

4 September 2016	Waikato	19–10	Manawatu	FMG Stadium Waikato, Hamilton
16:35 NZST	Try: Willis Halaholo 53'; Con: Damian McKenzie (1/1) 54'; Pen: Damian McKenzie (4/7) 13', 35', 40', 61'	Report	Try: Ambrose Curtis 22'; Con: Otere Black (1/1) 23'; Pen: Otere Black (1/2) 38'	Referee: Paul Williams

18 September 2016	Waikato	20–20	Taranaki	FMG Stadium Waikato, Hamilton
16:35 NZST	Try: Sevu Reece (2) 40', 41'; Tyler Campbell 64'; Con: Sam Christie (1/3) 42'; Pen: Sam Christie (1/1) 73'; Cards: Tawera Kerr-Barlow (yellow card) 6'	Report	Try: Jonathan Faauli 27'; Toa Halafihi (2) 44', 57'; Con: Marty McKenzie (1/3) 45'; Pen: Marty McKenzie (1/1) 10'	Referee: Ben O'Keeffe

28 September 2016	Waikato	23–29	Canterbury	FMG Stadium Waikato, Hamilton
19:35 NZST	Try: Jordan Manihera 12'; Whetu Douglas 27'; Iliesa Ratuva Tavuyara 65'; Con: Jordan Trainor (1/3) 29'; Pen: Jordan Trainor (2/2) 43', 50'		Try: Ben Funnell 21'; Johnny McNicholl 30'; Con: Richie Mo'unga (2/2) 22', 31'; Pen: Richie Mo'unga (2/2) 10', 16'; Jordie Barrett (3/3) 61', 69', 75'	Referee: Nick Briant

7 October 2016	Canterbury	47–18	North Harbour	AMI Stadium, Christchurch
19:35 NZST	Try: Tom Sanders 10'; George Bridge 18'; Jack Goodhue 56'; Richie Mo'unga 66'; Nathan Vella 68'; Jack Stratton 80'; Con: Jordie Barrett (3/4) 19', 57', 67'; Richie Mo'unga (1/1) 69'; Pen: Jordie Barrett (3/3) 4', 46', 50'	Ranfurly Shield	Try: Matt Vaega 7'; Sione Mafileo 27'; Con: Bryn Gatland 28'; Pen: Bryn Gatland 32', 43'	Referee: Ben O'Keefe

=== 2017 ===
21 June 2017	Canterbury	71–5	Wanganui	AMI Stadium, Christchurch
19:35 NZST	Try: Jack Stratton; Mark Maitland; Dylan Nel; Nick Werahiko (2); Marshall Suckling; Mitch Dunshea; Poasa Waqanibau; Steve Alfeld; Caleb Makene; Con: Brett Cameron (7); Finn Strawbridge (2); Pen: Brett Cameron	Ranfurly Shield	Try: Timoci Seruwalu

4 August 2017	Mid Canterbury	7–69	Canterbury	Ashburton Showgrounds
14:35 NZST	Try: Maleli Sau; Con: Jason Kjestrup	Ranfurly Shield	Try: Jed Brown; Tom Sanders; Brett Cameron; Marshall Suckling (2); Nathan Vella (2); Josh McKay; Nigel Gibb; Poasa Waqanibau; Hamish Dalzell; Con: Brett Cameron (4); McKay (3)

27 August 2017	Canterbury	30–24	Otago	AMI Stadium, Christchurch
16:35 NZST	Try: Ben Funnell 18'; Mitchell Dunshea 44'; Tim Bateman 50'; Jed Brown 76'; Con: Richie Mo'unga (2/4) 51', 77'; Pen: Richie Mo'unga (2/4) 8', 79'	Report	Try: Josh Ioane 14'; Mitchell Scott 54'; Sam Anderson-Heather 65'; Jona Nareki 68'; Con: Fletcher Smith (2/3) 55', 66'	Referee: Paul Williams

8 September 2017	Canterbury	78–20	Southland	AMI Stadium, Christchurch
17:45 NZST	Try: Richie Mo'unga (2) 10', 22'; Braydon Ennor (4) 41', 44', 65', 70'; George Bridge (3) 52', 58', 73'; Josh McKay 62'; Tom Bateman 76'; Con: Richie Mo'unga (5/6) 11', 23', 45', 53', 59'; Brett Cameron (5/5) 63', 66', 71', 74', 77'; Pen: Richie Mo'unga (1/2) 3'	Report	Try: Junior Ngaluafe 34'; Neria Fomai 38'; Con: Scott Eade (2/2) 35', 39'; Pen: Scott Eade (2/2) 20', 47'; Cards: Ryan Tongia (yellow card) 54'	Referee: Nick Briant

13 September 2017	Canterbury	78–5	Counties Manukau	AMI Stadium, Christchurch
19:35 NZST	Try: Mitchell Drummond (4) 4', 9', 31', 38'; Braydon Ennor 19'; Tim Bateman (3) 25', 44', 64'; Rob Thompson 57'; Poasa Waqanibau 61'; Josh McKay 75'; Con: Richie Mo'unga (10/11) 5', 10', 26', 32', 39', 45', 58', 62', 65', 76'; Pen: Richie Mo'unga (1/1) 2'	Report	Try: Nigel Ah Wong 47'	Referee: Brendon Pickerill

30 September 2017	Canterbury	37–17	Waikato	AMI Stadium, Christchurch
19:35 NZST	Try: Braydon Ennor 21'; Rob Thompson 32'; Josh McKay 35'; Tom Sanders 45'; Con: Richie Mo'unga (4/4) 22', 33', 36', 46'; Pen: Richie Mo'unga (3/3) 6', 28', 30'	Report	Try: Pita Ahki 38'; Sevu Reece (2) 56', 79'; Con: Sevu Reece (1/2) 79'	Referee: Glen Jackson

6 October 2017	Canterbury	43–55	Taranaki	AMI Stadium, Christchurch
19:35 NZST	Try: Rob Thompson (2) 9', 78'; Tom Sanders 11'; Tim Bateman 20'; George Bridge 27'; Braydon Ennor 45'; Con: Richie Mo'unga (5/6) 10', 12', 21', 28', 46'; Pen: Richie Mo'unga (1/1) 16'	Report	Try: Seta Tamanivalu 22'; Stephen Perofeta 34'; Pita Gus Sowakula 37'; Ricky Riccitelli 50'; Lachlan Boshier (2) 53', 68'; Manasa Mataele 71'; Con: Marty McKenzie (7/7) 23', 35', 38', 51', 54', 69', 72'; Pen: Marty McKenzie (1/1) 57'; Drop: Stephen Perofeta (1/1) 76'	Referee: Mike Fraser

11 October 2017	Taranaki	46–25	Manawatu	Yarrow Stadium, New Plymouth
19:35 NZST	Try: Waisake Naholo (2) 21', 40'; Seta Tamanivalu (2) 32', 36'; Charlie Ngatai 56'; Kylem O'Donnell 75'; Adrian Wyrill 78'; Con: Marty McKenzie (4/7) 37', 40', 57', 79'; Pen: Marty McKenzie (1/1) 12'; Cards: Declan O'Donnell (yellow card) 70'	Report	Try: Jamie Booth 51'; Ambrose Curtis 60'; Jade Te Rure 73'; Con: Jade Te Rure (2/3) 61', 74'; Pen: Otere Black (2/2) 16', 25'; Cards: Michael Alaalatoa (yellow card) 29'	Referee: Ben O'Keeffe

=== 2018 ===
28 July 2018	Taranaki	78–0	Poverty Bay	Tikorangi Domain, Tikorangi
14:35 NZST	Try: Vaeno (3) 1' c, 9' c, 77' m Potroz (2) 3' c, 26' c Naholo (2) 7' m, 16' c Waite 20' m Maka 29' c Northcott-Hill (2) 35' c, 45' c Boshier 52' c Con: Waite (7/9) 2', 4', 10', 17', 27', 36', 46'; Northcott-Hill (1/1) 29'; Matoe (1/2) 54'	Report		Attendance: 3,500; Referee: James Munro

4 August 2018	Taranaki	33–10	Wanganui	TSB Hub, Hāwera
14:35 NZST	Try: Naholo 18' c Penalty try 23'; Lewis (2) 25' c, 28' c Northcott-Hill 69' m Con: Waaka (3/4) 19', 26', 29'		Try: Gilbert 33' m Dibben 66' m	Attendance: 2,000; Referee: Michael Lash

24 August 2018	Taranaki	41–21	Manawatu	Yarrow Stadium, New Plymouth
19:45 NZST	Try: Manasa Mataele 6'; Beaudein Waaka 19'; Teihorangi Walden 32'; Toa Halafihi 39'; Daniel Waite 48'; Con: Beaudein Waaka (5/5) 7', 20', 33', 40', 49'; Pen: Beaudein Waaka (2/2) 24', 45'	Report	Try: Junior Laloifi 14'; Nick Crosswell 27'; Rob Thompson 68'; Con: Sam Malcolm (2/2) 15', 28'; Jade Te Rure (1/1) 69'	Referee: Mike Fraser

9 September 2018	Taranaki	19–33	Waikato	Yarrow Stadium, New Plymouth
16:35 NZST	Try: Regan Ware 13'; Manasa Mataele 44'; Seta Tamanivalu 49'; Con: Beaudein Waaka (2/3) 14', 50'	Report	Try: Dwayne Sweeney 2'; Adam Burn 18'; James Tucker 24'; Samisoni Taukei'aho 34'; Quinn Tupaea 37'; Con: Fletcher Smith (4/5) 3', 24', 35', 38'	Referee: Ben O'Keeffe

13 September 2018	Waikato	42–22	Hawke's Bay	Waikato Stadium, Hamilton
19:35 NZST	Try: Dwayne Sweeney 18'; Sevu Reece 28'; Jordan Manihera 33'; Murray Iti 60'; Fletcher Smith 67'; Raniera Takarangi 71'; Con: Fletcher Smith (6/6) 19', 29', 34', 61', 68', 72'	Report	Try: Brad Weber 7'; Tom Parsons 36'; Sasa Tofilau 79'; Con: Jamie-Jerry Taulagi (2/2) 8', 80'; Pen: Tiaan Falcon (1/1) 23'; Cards: Pasqualle Dunn (yellow card) 12'	Referee: Nick Briant

29 September 2018	Waikato	42–11	Southland	Waikato Stadium, Hamilton
14:35 NZST	Try: Dwayne Sweeney 12'; Sevu Reece 40'; Murray Iti 43'; Samisoni Taukei'aho (2) 52', 75'; Toby Smith 69'; Con: Fletcher Smith (6/6) 13', 40', 44', 53', 70', 76'	Report	Try: Tauasosi Tuimavave 14'; Pen: James Wilson (2/2) 10', 22'	Referee: Jamie Nutbrown

13 October 2018	Waikato	19–23	Otago	Waikato Stadium, Hamilton
17:05 NZST	Try: Josh Iosefa-Scott; Tyler Campbell; Bailyn Sullivan; Con: Fletcher Smith	Report	Try: Mitchell Scott; Josh Dickson; Joketani Koroi; Con: Josh Ioane (1); Pen: Josh Ioane (2)	Referee: Brendon Pickerill

=== 2019 ===
13 July 2019	Otago	41–21	Thames Valley	Wanaka Showgrounds, Wānaka
14:05 NZST	Try: Sekonaia Pole 40'; James Lentjes 45'; Ben Miller 52'; Aleki Morris 60'; Dylan Nel 71'; Slade McDowall 80'; Con: Ben Miller (4/6) 40', 52', 61', 72'; Faddes (0/1); Pen: Ben Miller (1/2) 78'	Report	Try: Harry Lafituanai (2) 29', 75'; Con: Reece Broughton (1/1) 30'; Cole Berridge (0/1); Pen: Reece Broughton (3/5) 8', 20', 48'; Cards: Lance Easton (yellow card) 44'	Attendance: 3,500; Referee: Nick Webster

26 July 2019	Otago	49–14	North Otago	Whitestone Contracting Stadium, Oamaru
14:05 NZST	Try: Vilimoni Koroi 10' c Joshua Dickson 17' c Aleki Morris 37' c Jona Nareki 43' c R. Gouws 62' c S. Mau 72' c James Lentjes 77' c Con: Ash Moeke (7/7) 11', 18', 38', 44', 63', 73', 78'; Cards: Sio Tomkinson (yellow card) 27'	Report	Try: H. Packman 28' c M. Kolinisau 59' c Con: R. Smith (2/2) 29', 60'	Referee: Rebecca Mahoney

17 August 2019	Otago	41–22	Southland	Forsyth Barr Stadium, Dunedin
16:35 NZST	Try: Jona Nareki (2) 4', 51'; Slade McDowall 40'; Dylan Nel 47'; Josh Dickson 55'; Rowan Gouws 69'; Con: Vilimoni Koroi (4/6) 5', 40+2', 48', 56'; Pen: Vilimoni Koroi (1/1) 13'	Report	Try: Josh Moorby 49'; Charles Alaimalo 63'; Bill Fukofuka 78'; Con: Marty McKenzie (2/3) 50', 64'; Pen: Marty McKenzie (1/2) 23'	Referee: Paul Williams (New Zealand)

30 August 2019	Otago	37–20	Manawatu	Forsyth Barr Stadium, Dunedin
19:35 NZST	Try: Vilimoni Koroi (3) 1', 38', 61'; Jona Nareki 23'; Sio Tomkinson 73'; Con: Josh Ioane (3/5) 2', 39', 75'; Pen: Josh Ioane (2/3) 33', 70'	Report	Try: Jamie Booth 5'; Adam Boult 10'; Con: Otere Black (2/2) 6', 12'; Pen: Otere Black (2/3) 36', 50'	Referee: Glen Jackson (New Zealand)

8 September 2019	Otago	35–27	Taranaki	Forsyth Barr Stadium, Dunedin
16:35 NZST	Try: Aleki Morris 2'; Jona Nareki (2) 40', 64'; Vilimoni Koroi 41'; Con: Vilimoni Koroi (3/4) 3', 40', 42'; Pen: Vilimoni Koroi (3/3) 23', 59', 68'	Report	Try: Mitchell Brown 36'; Stephen Perofeta 46'; Teihorangi Walden 51'; Con: Daniel Waite (3/3) 37', 47', 52'; Pen: Daniel Waite (2/3) 8', 15'	Referee: Nick Briant (New Zealand)

29 September 2019	Otago	45–35	Waikato	Forsyth Barr Stadium, Dunedin
14:05 NZST	Try: Slade McDowall 8'; Vilimoni Koroi (2) 12', 58'; Jona Nareki 29'; Aleki Morris 42'; Henry Purdy 65'; Con: Josh Ioane (3/6) 31', 43', 66'; Pen: Josh Ioane (3/3) 24', 50', 73'	Report	Try: Simon Parker 33'; Penalty try 40'; Samisoni Taukei'aho (2) 45', 70'; Mitch Jacobson 76'; Con: Fletcher Smith (4/4) 34', 46', 71', 78'; Cards: Fletcher Smith (yellow card) 51'	Referee: Richard Kelly

5 October 2019	Otago	25–35	Canterbury	Forsyth Barr Stadium, Dunedin
19:35 NZST	Try: Sio Tomkinson 53'; Adam Thomson 69'; Jona Nareki 76'; Con: Josh Ioane (2/3) 55', 70'; Pen: Josh Ioane (2/3) 36', 41'	Report	Try: Josh McKay 14'; Mitchell Drummond 43'; Sam Gilbert 57'; Tim Bateman 72'; Con: Brett Cameron (3/4) 15', 44', 58'; Pen: Brett Cameron (3/4) 11', 22', 80'; Cards: Tim Bateman (yellow card) 75'	Referee: Glen Jackson

13 October 2019	Canterbury	31–25	North Harbour	Rugby League Park, Christchurch
16:35 NZST	Try: Braydon Ennor 26'; Josh McKay (2) 39', 57'; Harry Allan 80+3'; Con: Brett Cameron (4/4) 27', 40', 59', 80+4'; Pen: Brett Cameron (1/3) 14'	Report	Try: Mark Tele'a 32', 65'; Osea Qamasea 47'; Lewis Gjaltema 71'; Con: Bryn Hall (1/2) 67'; Pen: Bryn Hall (1/1) 51'	Referee: James Doleman

== Top points scorers ==
The following are the top 10 points scorers for all Ranfurly Shield matches between 2010 and 2019.

=== Points scorers ===
Top 10 points scorers
No	Player	Team	T	C	P	DG	Pts
1	Ihaia West	Hawke's Bay	4	36	21	1	158
2	Richie Mo'unga	Canterbury	3	29	10	0	103
3	James Wilson	Southland	1	10	20	1	88
4	Trent Renata	Waikato	2	17	14	0	86
5	Beauden Barrett	Taranaki	1	5	16	0	63
6	Baden Kerr	Counties Manukau	0	9	14	0	60
6	Robbie Robinson	Southland	1	14	8	1	60
6	Ryan Tongia	Hawke's Bay	12	0	0	0	60
9	Tyrone Elkington-MacDonald	Hawke's Bay	1	9	9	0	50
9	Brendon O'Connor	Canterbury / Hawke's Bay	10	0	0	0	50

=== Try scorers ===
The following are the top ten try scorers for all Ranfurly Shield matches between 2010 and 2026.

Top 10 try scorers
No	Player	Team	Tries
1	Ryan Tongia	Hawke's Bay	12
2	Brendon O'Connor	Canterbury / Hawke's Bay	10
3	Braydon Ennor	Canterbury	8
3	Kurt Baker	Taranaki	8
4	Tim Bateman	Canterbury	7
4	Sevu Reece	Waikato	7
5	Shannan Chase	Hawke's Bay	6
5	Tony Lamborn	Hawke's Bay	6
6	Whetu Douglas	Waikato	5
6	Epalahame Faiva	Waikato	5
6	Iliesa Tavuyara	Waikato	5
6	Joe Webber	Waikato	5
6	Waisake Naholo	Taranaki	5
6	Rob Thompson	Canterbury / Manawatu	5
10	7 players on 4 tries		4

== See also ==
- Rugby union in New Zealand
- Hanan Shield
- Mitre 10 Cup
