= 2012 Heartland Championship =

- Date: 25 August 2012–28 October 2012
- Countries: New Zealand

Final positions
- Champions: East Coast
- Runner-up: Wanganui

Tournament statistics
- Top scorer(s): Glen Walters (102)
- Most tries: Liam Edwards (5); Saul Chase (5)

The 2012 Heartland Championship was the seventh season of the Heartland Championship, New Zealand's provincial rugby union competition, since its reorganisation in 2006, involving the 12 amateur rugby unions in New Zealand. The format was the same as in 2011. The tournament's round robin stage saw the 12 teams play 8 games. The top four teams in the table at the end of the 8 weeks played off for the Meads Cup, while the next four contested the Lochore Cup.

== Teams ==
Locations of teams in the 2012 Heartland Championship

The 2012 Heartland Championship was contested by the following teams:

Team	Super Rugby partner	Hometown
Buller	Crusaders	Westport
East Coast	Hurricanes	Ruatoria
Horowhenua-Kapiti	Hurricanes	Levin
King Country	Chiefs	Te Kūiti, Taupō
Mid Canterbury	Crusaders	Ashburton
North Otago	Highlanders	Oamaru
Poverty Bay	Hurricanes	Gisborne
South Canterbury	Crusaders	Timaru
Thames Valley	Chiefs	Paeroa
Wairarapa Bush	Hurricanes	Masterton
Wanganui	Hurricanes	Wanganui
West Coast	Crusaders	Greymouth

== Table ==
Qualified for Meads Cup
Qualified for Lochore Cup

Pos.	Team	Pld	W	D	L	For	Against	+/−	BP1	BP2	Pts
1	East Coast	8	7	0	1	230	177	+53	3	0	31
2	Wanganui	8	7	0	1	237	133	+104	3	0	31
3	Wairarapa Bush	8	6	0	2	219	130	+89	2	2	28
4	North Otago	8	5	0	3	195	194	+1	4	1	25
5	Buller	8	5	0	3	205	180	+25	3	2	25
6	South Canterbury	8	5	0	3	265	227	+38	3	1	21
7	Mid Canterbury	8	3	0	5	158	162	−4	2	3	17
8	Poverty Bay	8	3	0	5	212	247	−35	4	1	17
9	West Coast	8	2	0	6	140	185	−45	1	3	12
10	Thames Valley	8	2	0	6	203	263	−60	1	2	11
11	King Country	8	1	0	7	178	230	−52	2	3	9
12	Horowhenua-Kapiti	8	2	0	6	124	238	−114	1	0	9

- In the case of two teams being tied on points, the ranking of teams is decided by:

(1) the winner of the round robin match between the two provinces; then
(2) highest point difference; then
(3) most tries scored; then
(4) a coin toss.

- In the case of three or more teams being tied on points, the rankings of teams is decided by:

(1) the province with the most wins against other tied provinces in the Round Robin; then

(2) if two teams remain tied they shall be ranked according to the criteria listed above, but if more than two teams remain tied, they shall be ranked according to criteria (2) to (4) only.

== Results ==
The fixtures were released on 28 March 2012.

=== Week 1 ===
25 August 2012
13:00

Wairarapa Bush	32–21	South Canterbury
Try: Cameron Hayton; Johan VanVliet; Con: Glen Walters (2); Pen: Glen Walters (6)		Try: Sekope Maea; Aporasa Tabulawaki; Pen: Kurt Rooney (2)

Memorial Park, Masterton

25 August 2012
14:30

Mid Canterbury	23–24	Wanganui
Try: James Carr; Mac Sykes; Con: Andrew Letham (2); Pen: Andrew Letham (3)		Try: Asalemo Malo; Darren Munro; Con: Mark Davis; Pen: Mark Davis (4)

Ashburton Showgrounds, Ashburton

25 August 2012
14:30

Horowhenua-Kapiti	15–31	Poverty Bay
Pen: Sonny McBride (4); Perry Hayman		Try: Andrew Gardner; Henry Yortt; Kelvin Smith; Paula Tikomainaivalu; Con: Scott Leighton (4); Pen: Scott Leighton

Levin Domain, Levin

25 August 2012
14:30

Buller	24–14	Thames Valley
Try: James Foster; Apenise Ratugoieavanua; Con: Marty Banks; Pen: Marty Banks (4)		Try: Jason Laurich; Blake Hill; Con: Brook Tremayne (2)

Victoria Square, Westport

25 August 2012
14:30

East Coast	23–16	West Coast
Try: Everard Reid; Tau Moeke; Rua Tipoki; Con: Joel Semple; Pen: Joel Semple (2)		Try: Brad Houston; Rowan O'Gorman; Pen: Corey Deans (2)

Whakarua Park, Ruatoria

25 August 2012
14:30

King Country	30–31	North Otago
Try: Rupeni Seduadua; Ben Draper; Con: Kurt Strachan (3); Pen: Kurt Strachan (3)		Try: Samisoni Tongotongo; Tala Fagasoia; Ralph Darling; Chris Talanoa; Con: Hamish Buick (4); Pen: Hamish Buick

Rugby Park, Te Kūiti

=== Week 2 ===
1 September 2012
14:00

Thames Valley	31–17	Mid Canterbury
Try: Blake Hill; Lance Easton; Armyn Sanders; Con: David Harrison (2); Pen: David Harrison (4)		Try: Nick McKain; Con: Andrew Leatham (2); Pen: Andrew Leatham

Paeroa Domain, Paeroa

1 September 2012
14:30

South Canterbury	37–9	East Coast
Try: Liam Edwards; Timaru Tafa; Stephen Burt; Fa'aitu Tuamoheloa; Con: Liam Edwards (3); Pen: Liam Edwards (2)		Pen: John Semple (3)

Fraser Park, Timaru

1 September 2012
14:30

Poverty Bay	21–48	Wairarapa Bush
Try: Moss Doran; David Philander; Jason Taupawa; Con: Scott Leighton (3)		Try: Inia Katia; Nick Olson; Jessie McGilvray; Johan van Vliet; Cameron Hayton; Con: Glen Walters (6); Pen: Glen Walters (2)

Rugby Park, Gisborne

1 September 2012
14:30

West Coast	27–21	King Country
Try: Rowan O'Gorman; Nick Davis; Robert Gabriel; Con: Corey Deans (2); Pen: Corey Deans		Try: Sean Cressy; Dean Church; Con: Kurt Strachan; Pen: Kurt Strachan (3)

Rugby Park, Greymouth

1 September 2012
14:30

Wanganui	28–10	Horowhenua-Kapiti
Try: Mark Davis; Tremaine Gilbert; Saul Chase; Con: Mark Davis (2); Pen: Mark Davis (3)		Try: Perry Hayman

Cooks Gardens, Wanganui

1 September 2012
14:30

North Otago	22–15	Buller
Try: Ian Cooney; Con: Hamish Buick; Pen: Hamish Buick (4); Billy Guyton		Try: Andrew Norton Taylor; Iliasa Namua; Con: Marty Banks; Pen: Marty Banks

Centennial Park, Oamaru

=== Week 3 ===
8 September 2012
14:30

East Coast	20–18	Buller
Try: Rua Tipoki; Pomare Samupo; Con: Joel Semple; Pen: Joel Semple		Try: Traiel Jossefs; Peni Nabainivalu; Con: Marty Banks; Pen: Marty Banks (2)

Whakarua Park, Ruatoria

8 September 2012
14:30

West Coast	8–12	Wairarapa Bush
Try: Dave Woods; Pen: Corey Deans		Pen: Glen Walters (4)

Rugby Park, Greymouth

8 September 2012
14:30

Wanganui	42–3	Poverty Bay
Try: Vaan Rauhina; Andrew Retallick; Simon Dibben; Asalemo Malo; Saul Chase; Con: Mark Davis (6)		Pen: Scott Leighton

Cooks Gardens, Wanganui

8 September 2012
14:30

South Canterbury	42–37	Thames Valley
Try: Timaru Tafa; Tenari Saumani; Sekope Maea; Con: Liam Edwards (4); Pen: Liam Edwards (2)		Try: Blake Hill; Bruce Jones; Brett Ranga; Con: David Harrison (2); Pen: David Harrison (6)

Fraser Park, Timaru

8 September 2012
14:30

King Country	32–10	Horowhenua-Kapiti
Try: Kurt Strachan; G Waller; Ben Draper; Simeli Koniferedi; Con: Kurt Strachan (3); Pen: Kurt Strachan (2)		Try: Anthony Fox; Con: Sonny McBride; Pen: Sonny McBride

Owen Delany Park, Taupō

8 September 2012
14:30

Mid Canterbury	7–3	North Otago
Try: Misi Salave; Con: Andrew Leatham		Pen: Mataiasi Ahaleilei

Ashburton Showgrounds, Ashburton

=== Week 4 ===
15 September 2012
14:30

Wairarapa Bush	19–26	Wanganui
Try: Glen Walters; Con: Glen Walters; Pen: Glen Walters (4)		Try: Saul Chase; Roman Tutauha; Con: Mark Davis (2); Pen: Mark Davis (3); Drop: Mark Davis

Memorial Park, Masterton

15 September 2012
14:30

Horowhenua-Kapiti	25–19	Thames Valley
Try: Michael Campbell; Antony Fox; Sean Curry; Con: Josh Hamilton (2); Pen: Josh Hamilton (2)		Try: Jason Laurich; Con: David Harrison; Pen: David Harrison (4)

Paraparaumu Domain, Paraparaumu

15 September 2012
14:30

Buller	31–19	King Country
Try: Marty Banks; Phil Beveridge; Peni Nabainivalu; William Saukuru; Con: Marty Banks (4); Pen: Marty Banks		Try: Simeli Koniferedi; Dean Church; Ben Draper; Con: Sean Cressy; Kurt Strachan

Victoria Square, Westport

15 September 2012
14:30

Poverty Bay	31–13	West Coast
Try: Adam Ross; Henry Yortt; Jason Tuapawa; David Philander; Con: Scott Leighton (3)		Try: Sean McClure; Troy Tauwhare; Pen: Corey Deans

Rugby Park, Gisborne

15 September 2012
14:30

Mid Canterbury	13–20	East Coast
Try: Tukulua Tolu; Con: Andrew Leatham; Pen: Andrew Leatham; Solomona Parahi		Try: John Semple; Everard Reid; Con: John Semple (2); Pen: John Semple (2)

Ashburton Showgrounds, Ashburton

15 September 2012

North Otago	37–52	South Canterbury
Try: Rowan McKenzie; Matt Faddes; Rangi Hepi; Tony Lamborn; Tom Verdonk; Con: Tai Aholelei (3); Pen: Tai Aholelei (2)		Try: Tenari Saumani; Joeli Kotobolava; Steven Burt; Luke Brice; Liam Edwards; Con: Liam Edwards (4); Pen: Liam Edwards (2); Drop: Wally Wright

=== Week 5 ===
22 September 2012
14:00

Thames Valley	28–18	King Country
Try: Lance Easton; Jackson Achilles; Con: David Harrison (2); Pen: David Harrison (3)		Try: Carl Alcock; Simeli Koniferedi; Dean Church; Pen: Kurt Strachan

Boyd Park, Te Aroha

22 September 2012
14:30

Horowhenua-Kapiti	31–15	West Coast
Try: Dave Thompson; Rob Millar; L Tuiavi'i; Con: Josh Hamilton (4); Pen: Josh Hamilton		Try: Sean McClure; Phil Thomson; Con: Sean McClure; Pen: Sean McClure

Levin Domain, Levin

22 September 2012
14:30

South Canterbury	32–45	Buller
Try: Nate Robinson; John Andrews; Stephen Burt; Sam Vea; Con: Liam Edwards (3); Pen: Liam Edwards (2)		Try: William Sakuru; Peni Naibainivalu; Ilaisa Namua; Bevan Te Tai; Con: Marty Banks (4); Pen: Marty Banks (4)

Fraser Park, Timaru

22 September 2012
14:30

East Coast	25–17	Wanganui
Try: Tau Moeke; Ziggy Tisahoi; Waimutu Chemis; Con: John Semple (2); Pen: John Semple (2)		Try: Sam Dibben; Saul Chase; Con: Mark Davis (2); Pen: Mark Davis

Whakarua Park, Ruatoria

22 September 2012
14:30

North Otago	24–23	Poverty Bay
Try: Ulisoni Tahitua; Billy Guyton; Con: Hamish Buick; Pen: Hamish Buick (3); Billy Guyton		Try: Adam Ross; Andrew Gardner; Con: Scott Leighton; Pen: Scott Leighton (2)

Centennial Park, Oamaru

22 September 2012
14:30

Wairarapa Bush	31–6	Mid Canterbury
Try: Cameron Hayton; Tom Fleming; Glen Walters; Con: Glen Walters (2); Pen: Glen Walters (4)		Pen: Ben Kitching (2)

Memorial Park, Masterton

=== Week 6 ===
29 September 2012
14:00

Thames Valley	38–53	East Coast
Try: David Harrison; Caleb Brown; Jackson Achilles; Jason Laurich; Blake Hill; Joseph Murray; Con: David Harrison (3); Brook Tremayne		Try: Whaimotu Craft-Chemis; Brent Ingram; John Semple; Charlie Harrison; Ziggy Fisiihoi; Marty Lloyd; Tau Moeke; Con: John Semple (5); Pen: John Semple

Paeroa Domain, Paeroa

29 September 2012
14:30

Wanganui	39–22	North Otago
Try: Sam Dibben; Rhema Sagote; Saul Chase; Ace Malo; Vaan Rauhina; Con: Ace Malo; Mark Davis		Try: Jack Wolfreys; Tala Fagasoaia; Chris Talanoa; Con: Hamish Buick; Ben Guyton; Pen: Ben Guyton

Cooks Gardens, Wanganui

29 September 2012
14:30

King Country	15–25	Wairarapa Bush
Try: Simeli Koniferedi; Dean Church; Con: Sean Cressy; Pen: Sean Cressy		Try: Inia Katia; Nick Olsen; Tom Fleming; Con: Glen Walters (2); Pen: Glen Walters (2)

Owen Delany Park, Taupō

29 September 2012
14:30

West Coast	24–29	Mid Canterbury
Try: Brad Houston; David Crouchley; Con: Sean McClure (3); Pen: Phil Thomson		Try: Manase Nonu; Ben Kitching; Hakarangi Tichborn; Richard Catherwood; Con: Solomona Paraki (3); Pen: Solomona Paraki

Rugby Park, Greymouth

29 September 2012
14:30

Buller	34–16	Horowhenua-Kapiti
Try: William Sakuru; Marty Banks; Andrew Norton Taylor; Craig Moore; Con: Marty Banks (4); Pen: Marty Banks (2)		Try: Tainui Brown; Con: Josh Hamilton; Pen: Josh Hamilton (3)

Victoria Square, Westport

29 September 2012
14:30

Poverty Bay	33–52	South Canterbury
Try: John Lesi; Nick Wilson; David Philander; Paula Tikomainaivalu; Con: Scott Leighton (2); Pen: Scott Leighton (3)		Try: Sam Vea; Kali Latu; Faiaitu Tuamoheloa; Sekope Maea; Jarrad Trevathan; Eric Smith; Liam Edwards; Con: Liam Edwards (6)

Rugby Park, Gisborne

=== Week 7 ===
6 October 2012
14:00

Mid Canterbury	48–12	Horowhenua-Kapiti
Try: Misi Salave; Mac Sykes; Richard Catherwood; Toma Brown; Faaleaupu Faatavaau; Con: Solomona Paraki (5); Pen: Solomona Paraki		Try: Dave Thompson; Antony Fox; Con: Josh Hamilton

Ashburton Showgrounds, Ashburton

6 October 2012
14:00

Thames Valley	29–56	Poverty Bay
Try: Lance Easton; David Harrison; Con: David Harrison (2); Pen: David Harrison (5)		Try: Kelvin Smith; Paula Tikimainaivalu; Moss Doran; Adam Ross; Josese Bolabasaga; Con: Scott Leighton (5); Brad Turei (3)

Paeroa Domain, Paeroa

6 October 2012
14:30

West Coast	19–12	South Canterbury
Try: Brad Houston; Con: Sean McClure; Pen: Phil Thomson; Sean McClure (3)		Try: Jared Trevathan; Liam Edwards; Con: Liam Edwards

Rugby Park, Greymouth

6 October 2012
14:30

East Coast	56–24	King Country
Try: John Semple; Verdon Bartlett; Pomare Samupo; Whaimotu Craft-Chemis; Ziggy Fisiihoi; Everard Reid; Brent Ingram; Ben Parkes; Con: John Semple (3)		Try: Paul Olsen; Dean Church; Con: Sean Cressy; Kurt Strachan

Whakarua Park, Ruatoria

6 October 2012
14:30

Wairarapa Bush	21–28	North Otago
Try: Nathan Hunt; Byron Karaitiana; Con: Glen Walters; Pen: Glen Walters (3)		Try: Jack Wolfreys; Rowan McKenzie; Eric Duff; Tim O'Malley; Con: Billy Guyton; Pen: Billy Guyton; Drop: Lemi Masoe

Memorial Park, Masterton

6 October 2012
14:30

Wanganui	39–12	Buller
Try: Gene Ropoama; Asalemo Malo; Vance Pereka; Moli Sagapolutele; Con: Nick Harding (4); Pen: Nick Harding (2)		Try: Apenise Ratugoleavanua; Con: William Sakuru

Cooks Gardens, Wanganui

=== Week 8 ===
13 October 2012
14:30

Buller	26–18	West Coast
Try: James Foster; William Sakuru; Con: Marty Banks (2); Pen: Marty Banks (4)		Try: Rowan O'Gorman; Luke Hughes; Con: Sean McClure; Pen: Sean McClure (2)

Victoria Square, Westport

13 October 2012
14:30

Horowhenua-Kapiti	5–31	Wairarapa Bush
Try: Perry Hayman		Try: Jesse McGilvray; Richard Puddy; James Goodger; Nick Olson; Con: Glen Walters; Pen: Glen Walters (3)

Levin Domain, Levin

13 October 2012
14:30

King Country	19–22	Wanganui
Try: Paul Olsen; Simeli Koniferedi; Con: Sean Cressy (2)		Try: Rhema Sagote; Matt Koubaridis; Peter Rowe; Con: Nick Harding (2); Pen: Nick Harding

Rugby Park, Te Kūiti

13 October 2012

South Canterbury	17–15	Mid Canterbury
Try: Liam Edwards; Timaru Tafa; Con: Liam Edwards		Try: Tukulua Tolu; Con: Solomona Paraki; Pen: Solomona Paraki

Fraser Park, Timaru

13 October 2012
14:30

North Otago	28–7	Thames Valley
Try: Tony Lamborn; Billy Guyton; Jack Wolfreys; Chris Talanoa; Con: Billy Guyton (4)		Try: Richard Judd; Con: David Harrison

Centennial Park, Oamaru

13 October 2012
15:00

Poverty Bay	14–24	East Coast
Try: Moss Doran; Pen: Scott Leighton (3)		Try: Siegfried Fisiihoi; Pomare Samupo; Mike King; Con: John Semple (2)

Rugby Park, Gisborne

== Finals ==
=== Semifinals ===
Meads Cup

20 October 2012
14:30

East Coast	26–15	North Otago
Try: John Semple; Brent Ingram; Everard Reid; Con: John Semple; Pen: John Semple (3)		Try: Tala Fagasila; Jack Wolfreys; Con: Billy Guyton; Pen: Billy Guyton

Whakarua Park, Ruatoria

20 October 2012
14:30

Wanganui	23–20	Wairarapa Bush
Try: Phil Chase; Jon Smyth; Con: Nick Harding (2); Pen: Nick Harding (3)		Try: Nathan Hunt; Inia Katia; Con: Glen Walters (2); Pen: Glen Walters (2)

Cooks Gardens, Wanganui

Lochore Cup

20 October 2012
14:30

Buller	42–22	Poverty Bay
Try: James Foster; Trael Joass; Andrew Norton-Taylor; Peni Nabainavalu; Isei Lewaqai; Con: Marty Banks (4); Pen: Marty Banks (2); Drop: Marty Banks		Try: Beauden Waaka; Ben Payne; Con: Beauden Waaka (2); Pen: Scott Leighton

Victoria Square, Westport

20 October 2012
14:30

South Canterbury	48–20	Mid Canterbury
Try: Stephen Burt; Sam Vea; Kali Latu; Tenare Saumani; Liam Edwards; Afala Tailega; Con: Liam Edwards (5); Pen: Liam Edwards		Try: Ben Kitching; Nick McKain; Jon Dampney; Con: Solomona Paraki; Pen: Solomona Paraki

Fraser Park, Timaru

=== Finals ===
Meads Cup

27 October 2012
13:35

East Coast	29–27	Wanganui
Try: Tau Moeke; Ziggy Fisiihoi; Mike King; Verdon Bartlett; Con: John Semple (3); Pen: John Semple		Try: Nick Cranston; Rhema Sagote; Asalemo Malo; Con: Nick Harding (3); Pen: Nick Harding; Drop: Areta Lama

Whakarua Park, Ruatoria

Lochore Cup

28 October 2012
14:35

Buller	31–28	South Canterbury
Try: Andrew Norton-Taylor; Pene Nabainivalu; Iliasa Namua; Con: Marty Banks (2); Pen: Marty Banks (4)		Try: Liam Edwards; Kali Latu; Con: Liam Edwards (2); Pen: Liam Edwards (3)

Victoria Square, Westport

== Statistics ==
Top 10 points scorers
Player	Team	Tries	Conversions	Penalties	Drop goals	Total
Glen Walters	Wairarapa Bush	2	13	22	0	102
Liam Edwards	South Canterbury	5	20	8	0	89
Marty Banks	Buller	2	15	14	0	82
David Harrison	Thames Valley	1	10	17	0	76
Mark Davis	Wanganui	1	14	11	1	69
Joel Semple	East Coast	2	11	11	0	65
Kurt Strachan	King Country	1	8	9	0	48
Scott Leighton	Poverty Bay	0	13	7	0	47
Hamish Buick	North Otago	0	7	8	0	38
Josh Hamilton	Horowhenua-Kapiti	0	7	6	0	32

== See also ==
- Hanan Shield competed for by Mid Canterbury, North Otago and South Canterbury
- Rundle Cup played between Buller and West Coast
- New Zealand Heartland XV
- Ranfurly Shield 2010–2019
- 2012 ITM Cup
