= 2014 Heartland Championship =

- Date: 23 August 2014–26 October 2014
- Countries: New Zealand

Final positions
- Champions: Mid Canterbury (Meads Cup); Wanganui (Lochore Cup)
- Runner-up: Buller (Meads Cup); North Otago (Lochore Cup)

The 2014 Heartland Championship was the ninth edition of the Heartland Championship, a rugby union competition involving the twelve amateur rugby unions in New Zealand. The tournament involved a round-robin stage in which the twelve teams played eight games each and then the top four advanced to the Meads Cup semifinals, while fifth to eighth advanced to the Lochore Cup semifinals. In both of these knockout stages the top seeds (first and fifth) played at home against the lowest seeds (fourth and eighth), the second highest seeds (second and sixth) played at home against the third highest seeds (third and seventh) and the final had the higher seed play at home against the lower seed.

== Teams ==
Locations of teams in the 2014 Heartland Championship

The 2014 Heartland Championship was contested by the following teams:

Team	Super Rugby partner	Hometown	Home stadium	Capacity
Buller	Crusaders	Westport	Victoria Square	5,000
East Coast	Hurricanes	Ruatoria	Whakarua Park	3,000
Horowhenua-Kapiti	Hurricanes	Levin	Levin Domain	6,500
King Country	Chiefs	Taupō	Owen Delany Park	20,000
Mid Canterbury	Crusaders	Ashburton	Ashburton Showgrounds	5,000
North Otago	Highlanders	Oamaru	Whitestone Contracting Stadium	7,000
Poverty Bay	Hurricanes	Gisborne	More FM Rugby Park	18,000
South Canterbury	Crusaders	Timaru	Fraser Park	12,000
Thames Valley	Chiefs	Paeroa	Paeroa Domain	3,000
Wairarapa Bush	Hurricanes	Masterton	Trust House Memorial Park	10,000
Wanganui	Hurricanes	Wanganui	Cooks Gardens	15,000
West Coast	Crusaders	Greymouth	Rugby Park	6,000

== Pre-season ==
Two Heartland Championship teams – Thames Valley and Mid Canterbury – challenged Counties Manukau for the Ranfurly Shield in two matches that took place in at Counties Manukau's home ground, ECOLight Stadium in Pukekohe.

2 July 2014
18:00 (NZST)

Counties Manukau	68–0	Thames Valley
Try: Page (3); Vaipulu (2); Hancy; Pulu; Ropati; Graham; Penalty try Con: Page (6/10); Pen: Page (2/2)	Report	Cards: MacDonald

ECOLight Stadium, Pukekohe

9 July 2014
18:00 (NZST)

Counties Manukau	46–10	Mid Canterbury
Try: Hyatt (2); Page; Vaipulu; Tu'ugafasi; Pulu; Muirhead; Con: Page (4/6); Pen: Page (1/1)	Report	Try: Jon Sharpe; Con: Williams; Pen: Williams

ECOLight Stadium, Pukekohe

== Standings ==
Pos.	Team	Pld	W	D	L	PF	PA	PD	TB	LB	Pts
1	Buller	8	8	0	0	282	145	+137	5	0	37
2	Poverty Bay	8	5	1	2	231	168	+63	5	1	28
3	Mid Canterbury	8	5	1	2	258	139	+119	3	1	26
4	Horowhenua-Kapiti	8	5	2	1	169	121	+48	1	1	26
5	King Country	8	5	0	3	196	176	+20	3	2	25
6	South Canterbury	8	4	0	4	202	165	+37	4	1	21
7	North Otago	8	4	0	4	174	155	+19	1	2	20
8	Wanganui	8	3	0	5	203	194	+9	3	2	17
9	Thames Valley	8	3	1	4	139	135	+2	0	3	17
10	West Coast	8	2	0	6	163	232	−69	2	3	13
11	Wairarapa Bush	8	1	1	6	151	238	−87	2	1	9
12	East Coast	8	0	0	8	67	367	−300	0	0	0

Meads Cup, Heartland Championship and ITM Cup Championship qualification
Lochore Cup qualification

In the case of a two-team tie on points the ranking of teams is decided by:

- (1) the winner of the round robin match between the two provinces; then
- (2) highest point difference; then
- (3) most tries scored; then
- (4) a coin toss.

In the case of a three-team or more tie on points the ranking of teams is decided by:

- (1) the province with the most wins against other tied provinces in the Round Robin; then
- (2) if two teams remain tied they shall be ranked according to the criteria listed above, but if more than two teams remain tied, they shall be ranked according to criteria (2) to (4) only.

== Regular season ==
The schedule of fixtures was released on 3 April 2014.

=== Round 1 ===
23 August 2014
14:00 (NZST)

King Country	32–13	Wairarapa Bush

Owen Delany Park, Taupō

23 August 2014
14:30 (NZST)

Mid Canterbury	52–27	West Coast

Ashburton Showgrounds, Ashburton

23 August 2014
14:30 (NZST)

Poverty Bay	52–12	East Coast

Rugby Park, Gisborne

23 August 2014
14:30 (NZST)

South Canterbury	31–18	Wanganui

Fraser Park, Timaru

23 August 2014
14:30 (NZST)

Buller	17–9	North Otago

Victoria Square, Westport

23 August 2014
14:30 (NZST)

Horowhenua-Kapiti	19–19	Thames Valley

Levin Domain, Levin

=== Round 2 ===
30 August 2014
13:30 (NZST)

Wairarapa Bush	23–23	Mid Canterbury

Memorial Park, Masterton

30 August 2014
14:00 (NZST)

Thames Valley	15–10	King Country

Boyd Park, Te Aroha

30 August 2014
14:30 (NZST)

Wanganui	23–34	Horowhenua-Kapiti

Cooks Gardens, Wanganui

30 August 2014
14:30 (NZST)

West Coast	15–49	South Canterbury

Rugby Park, Greymouth

30 August 2014
14:30 (NZST)

East Coast	6–62	Buller

Whakarua Park, Ruatoria

30 August 2014
14:30 (NZST)

North Otago	43–34	Poverty Bay

Centennial Park, Oamaru

=== Round 3 ===
6 September 2014
13:30 (NZST)

South Canterbury	43–16	Wairarapa Bush

Fraser Park, Timaru

6 September 2014
14:00 (NZST)

Thames Valley	20–15	Mid Canterbury

Paeroa Domain, Paeroa

6 September 2014
14:30 (NZST)

Wanganui	20–15	North Otago

Cooks Gardens, Wanganui

6 September 2014
14:30 (NZST)

Horowhenua-Kapiti	37–10	East Coast

Levin Domain, Levin

6 September 2014
14:30 (NZST)

King Country	29–53	Buller

Rugby Park, Te Kūiti

6 September 2014
14:30 (NZST)

Poverty Bay	29–20	West Coast

Rugby Park, Gisborne

=== Round 4 ===
13 September 2014
14:30 (NZST)

Buller	19–10	South Canterbury

Victoria Square, Westport

13 September 2014
14:30 (NZST)

East Coast	8–21	Thames Valley

Whakarua Park, Ruatoria

13 September 2014
14:30 (NZST)

Mid Canterbury	30–14	Wanganui

Ashburton Showgrounds, Ashburton

13 September 2014
14:30 (NZST)

North Otago	14–17	King Country

Centennial Park, Oamaru

13 September 2014
14:30 (NZST)

Wairarapa Bush	10–23	Poverty Bay

Memorial Park, Masterton

13 September 2014
14:30 (NZST)

West Coast	17–19	Horowhenua-Kapiti

Rugby Park, Greymouth

=== Round 5 ===
20 September 2014
14:00 (NZST)

Thames Valley	15–19	North Otago

Paeroa Domain, Paeroa

20 September 2014
14:30 (NZST)

Wanganui	44–7	East Coast

Cooks Gardens, Wanganui

20 September 2014
14:30 (NZST)

Horowhenua-Kapiti	12–9	Wairarapa Bush

Levin Domain, Levin

20 September 2014
14:30 (NZST)

King Country	15–10	West Coast

Owen Delany Park, Taupō

20 September 2014
14:30 (NZST)

Mid Canterbury	19–29	Buller

Ashburton Showgrounds, Ashburton

20 September 2014
14:30 (NZST)

South Canterbury	32–28	Poverty Bay

Fraser Park, Timaru

=== Round 6 ===
27 September 2014
14:30 (NZST)

Buller	19–12	Horowhenua-Kapiti

Victoria Square, Westport

27 September 2014
14:30 (NZST)

East Coast	12–67	Mid Canterbury

Whakarua Park, Ruatoria

27 September 2014
14:30 (NZST)

Poverty Bay	35–29	King Country

Rugby Park, Gisborne

27 September 2014
14:30 (NZST)

North Otago	22–19	South Canterbury

Forsyth Barr Stadium, Dunedin

27 September 2014
14:00 (NZST)

Wairarapa Bush	20–18	Thames Valley

Memorial Park, Masterton

27 September 2014
13:00 (NZST)

West Coast	23–17	Wanganui

Rugby Park, Greymouth

=== Round 7 ===
4 October 2014
14:30 (NZST)

Buller	29–24	West Coast

Victoria Square, Westport

4 October 2014
14:30 (NZST)

East Coast	7–34	King Country

Whakarua Park, Ruatoria

4 October 2014
14:00 (NZST)

Horowhenua-Kapiti	23–11	South Canterbury

Levin Domain, Levin

4 October 2014
14:30 (NZST)

Mid Canterbury	28–7	North Otago

Ashburton Showgrounds, Ashburton

4 October 2014
14:30 (NZST)

Thames Valley	9–17	Poverty Bay

Paeroa Domain, Paeroa

4 October 2014
14:30 (NZST)

Wanganui	38–24	Wairarapa Bush

Cooks Gardens, Wanganui

=== Round 8 ===
11 October 2014
14:30 (NZST)

King Country	30–29	Wanganui

Rugby Park, Te Kūiti

11 October 2014
14:30 (NZST)

North Otago	45–5	East Coast

Centennial Park, Oamaru

11 October 2014
14:30 (NZST)

Poverty Bay	13–13	Horowhenua-Kapiti

Rugby Park, Gisborne

11 October 2014
14:30 (NZST)

South Canterbury	7–24	Mid Canterbury

Fraser Park, Timaru

11 October 2014
14:30 (NZST)

Wairarapa Bush	36–49	Buller

Memorial Park, Masterton

11 October 2014
14:30 (NZST)

West Coast	27–22	Thames Valley

Rugby Park, Greymouth

== Finals ==
Meads Cup semi-finals
1	Buller	22
4	Horowhenua-Kapiti	15
2	Poverty Bay	22
3	Mid Canterbury	29

Meads Cup final
1	Buller	13
3	Mid Canterbury	36

Lochore Cup semi-finals
5	King Country	6
8	Wanganui	37
6	South Canterbury	12
7	North Otago	16

Lochore Cup final
7	North Otago	12
8	Wanganui	14

=== Semifinals ===
Meads Cup

18 October 2014

Buller	22–15	Horowhenua-Kapiti

Victoria Square, Westport

18 October 2014

Poverty Bay	22–29	Mid Canterbury

Rugby Park, Gisborne

Lochore Cup

18 October 2014

King Country	6–37	Wanganui

Rugby Park, Te Kuiti

18 October 2014

South Canterbury	12–16	North Otago

Fraser Park, Timaru

=== Finals ===
Meads Cup

25 October 2014

Buller	13–36	Mid Canterbury

Victoria Square, Westport

Lochore Cup

26 October 2014

North Otago	12–14	Wanganui

Centennial Park, Oamaru

== See also ==
- Hanan Shield competed for by Mid Canterbury, North Otago and South Canterbury
- Rundle Cup played between Buller and West Coast
- New Zealand Heartland XV
- Ranfurly Shield 2010–2019
- 2014 ITM Cup
