= 1996 Western Samoa rugby union tour of New Zealand =

- Manager: Tate Simi
- Tour captain: Pat Lam
Summary
P	W	D	L
Total
7	4	0	3
Test match
2	0	0	2
Opponent
P	W	D	L
New Zealand
1	0	0	1
NZ Maori
1	0	0	1

The 1996 Western Samoa rugby union tour of New Zealand was a series of rugby union matches played during May and June 1996 in New Zealand by the Western Samoa national rugby union team.

== Results ==
Scores and results list Western Samoa's points tally first.

Opponent	For	Against	Date	Venue	Status
Wellington	30	52	26 May 1996	Wellington	Tour match
Counties	31	19	29 May 1996	Pukekohe Stadium, Pukekohe	Tour match
Taranaki	26	18	1 June 1996	Rugby Park, New Plymouth	Tour match
Waiparapa Bush	23	18	3 June 1996	Memorial Park, Masterton	Tour match
New Zealand	10	51	7 June 1996	McLean Park, Napier	Test match
King Country	27	20	11 June 1996	Rugby Park, Te Kūiti	Tour match
NZ Maori	15	28	14 June 1996	Ericsson Stadium, Auckland	Test match
