= Ron Bryers =

- Born: 14 November 1919 Raetihi, New Zealand
- Died: 20 August 1987 (aged 67) Tauranga, New Zealand
- School: Ohakune District High School
- Notable relative: Rhonda Bryers (daughter)
- Occupation: Teacher

Rugby union career
- Position: Lock
Provincial / State sides
Years	Team	Apps	(Points)
1946	King Country	11	(0)
International career
Years	Team	Apps	(Points)
1949	New Zealand	1	(0)

Ronald Frederick Bryers (14 November 1919 – 20 August 1987) was a New Zealand rugby union player. He was a lock, but in his early career was in the backs and was a loose forward. He played one match for New Zealand, against Australia in the first test in 1949.

Bryers was born in Raetihi and educated at Ohakune District High School. He enlisted in the New Zealand Army in World War II; he was then a teacher living in the Bulls Schoolhouse. He served in the 34th Battalion, and played in service games.

In 1946, he played for the New Zealand Māori against Australia. As a Māori, he could not be selected for the 1949 tour of South Africa so played against Australia instead. He retired as headmaster of Mount Maunganui primary school, and died in Tauranga Hospital.

He captained King Country. He was a selector for the New Zealand Māori from 1957 to 1958 and for Bay of Plenty from 1962 to 1973.
