= King Country Rugby Football Union =

NZ rugby union team

- Nickname: Rams
- Founded: 1922; 104 years ago
- Region: King Country, including Taupō District of Manawatū-Whanganui, Hawke's Bay, Waikato and Bay of Plenty
- Ground(s): Rugby Park, Te Kūiti; Owen Delany Park, Taupō; Taumarunui Domain, Taumarunui
- Chairman: Jason Church
- Coach: Aarin Dunster
- Captain: Liam Rowlands
- League: Heartland Championship
- 2026: 1st (Meads Cup champions)
Team kit

Official website
- www.kingcountryrugby.co.nz

The King Country Rugby Football Union is a constituent union in the New Zealand Rugby Union. It is located in the central North Island of New Zealand in an area known as the King Country. It was formed in 1922 when the South Auckland Rugby Union was split into three (the other two Unions formed were Waikato and Thames Valley).

== History ==
The King Country Rugby Football Union was formed in 1922, by the amalgamation of the first King Country Rugby Union (which was renamed as the Taumarunui Sub-union in 1922) along with the Ruapehu Sub-union in Ohakune (founded 1908), Maniapoto Sub-union in Te Kūiti (1907) and Ōhura Sub-union (1920). These were joined by Ōtorohanga Sub-union in 1927, Kawhia in 1926 (founded 1920) and Kaitieke in 1933 with the Taupō Sub-union transferring from the Hawkes Bay Rugby Union in 1987. The Ruapehu Sub-union returned to its original parent union the Wanganui Rugby Union in 1970.

The originally named King Country Rugby Union was formed in 1905 by the Manunui, Matapuna, Oio and Kakahi rugby clubs. In 1907, the newly formed Taumarunui rugby club replaced Oio.

This was the second attempt to establish a Rugby Union in the middle of the North Island, as in 1920 the Rangatiki, Taihape, Ruapehu sub-unions (all affiliated to the Wanganui Rugby Union), and the King Country Union (affiliated to South Auckland) had applied for affiliation as the Main Trunk Union. However, this was declined after the Wanganui Rugby Union objected to the loss of their country players.

In those early years King Country representative games were held in Te Kūiti, Taumarunui and Raetihi or Ohakune. Ōtorohanga was first used for a representative game in 1939 with representative games also being hosted in Tokaanu (1966) and Tūrangi (1967). In later years King Country played home games at Piopio, Maihiihi, and Waitomo.

King Country played in light blue and green until 1949 when it switched to maroon and gold hoops. In 1980, a maroon jersey with gold collar and cuffs was adopted. The current strip has been used since 1994.

King Country has made many challenges for the Ranfurly Shield over the years without success but having come close at times. In 1958 they went down 11-15 to Taranaki in a hard fought game. In 1969 they came even closer when good mates Colin Meads and Kel Tremain were the respective captains, King Country storming back from 6–19 at half time in a torrid second half before going down 16–19.

A well-known challenge took place in 1988 against Auckland at Rugby Park in Te Kūiti when “Boris the Boar” mysteriously got onto the field and camped in the Auckland 22 for much of the second half.

In 2015 King Country won the Lochore Cup for the first time beating North Otago 47-34. In the following 2026 season King Country made the Lochore Cup final but lost 22-44 to North Otago.

With the 2020 Heartland Championship cancelled due to Covid-19, the Rams played three First-Class Fixtures against some of their traditional Heartland Rivals. King Country lost their first match against Wairarapa-Bush in the inaugural Meads-Lochore Scroll Fixture (18–22). They won their second fixture versus East Coast (34–22) and in their final game they became holders of the Sir Colin Meads Memorial log beating Whanganui 16–11 in Taumarunui. This game was also Carl Carmichaels 100th first-class game.

In 2024 King Country won the Lochore Cup for the second time.

In 2026 King Country won the Meads Cup for the first time after qualifying 3rd after the regular season. King Country beat North Otago in the semi-final and won the final 24-14 against Mid Canterbury.

== Clubs ==
King Country Rugby Football Union is made up of 11 clubs.

- Bush United Rugby Football Club, Benneydale
- Kio Kio United Sports Club, Maihiihi
- Piopio Rugby Football Club, Piopio
- Taumarunui Districts Rugby Football Club, Taumarunui
- Taumarunui Rugby & Sports Club, Taumarunui
- Taupo Marist, Taupō
- Taupo Rugby & Sports Club, Taupō
- Taupo United Inc. Taupō
- Tongariro Sports Club Inc. Tūrangi
- Waitete Rugby Football Club, Te Kūiti
- Waitomo Rugby Sports & Recreation Club, Waitomo

=== Club champions ===
Meads Shield

- 2022 - Taupo Sports 37 Piopio 19
- 2023 - Taupo Sports 42 Tongariro United 35
- 2024 - Taumarunui Districts 39 Taupo Marist 22
- 2025 - Tongariro United 17 Taupo Marist 10
- 2026 - Taupo Marist 36 Taupo Sports 17

=== Former clubs ===
King Country clubs that are now defunct or in recess include the following.

Previously affiliated clubs by sub-union
Kawhia	Otorohanga (Northern King Country)	Maniapoto	Ohura	Taumarunui	Kaitieke	Tongariro	Taupō
Kawhia	Otewa	Hangatiki	Ohura Valley	Hikurangi	Kaitieke	Turangi	Wairakei Marist
Oparau	Honikiwi	Oparure	Matiere	Ongarue	Owhango	Pihanga	Mangakino
Makomako	Otorohanga Huia	Te Kūiti	Tokirima	Taumarunui Athletic	Raurimu	Rotoaira	Tihoi
Taharoa	Olympians	Te Kuiti Railways	Niho Niho	Manunui	Returuke	Rangipo	Taupo Athletic
Awaroa	Tigers	Huia	Ohura Kia-Toa	Southern United	Huimai	Waikune	Tauhara
Kinohaku	Waitomo Valley	Aria-Mokauiti	Ohura Athletic	Tuhua	United	Downers	Mokai
Marokopa	Otorohanga Power Board	Mangaotaki	Ohura	Okahukura	Example	Mountaineers	Oruanui
Coast	Otorohanga Old Boys	Nehenehenui	North Ohura	Oio (Kakihi)		Tokaanu	College Old Boys
Karioi	Rangitoto	Mahoenui		Matapuna			Rotokawa
Moerangi		Waitanguru		Ngati Haua			Waitahanui
Te Rauamoa		Mangapehi		Waituhi			
Te Waitere				Hauaroa			
Hauturu				Forresters			

== Secondary schools ==
As King Country is a geographically large union with a relatively low population there are only a few secondary schools within the region so it doesn't have a consolidated Secondary Schools competition. Schools play their rugby in other provinces such as Waikato and Bay of Plenty Rugby Union that can offer better opportunities. Players from these schools are still eligible for the King Country Secondary Schools and U19 Rugby Representative teams.

- Ōtorohanga College
- Piopio College
- Tauhara College
- Taumarunui High School
- Taupo-nui-a-Tia College
- Te Kūiti High School
- Te Kura o Hirangi, Tūrangi
- Tongariro School, Tūrangi

Together these schools are able to challenge for the Sam Te Kaha Shield, which is a challenge shield between all King Country Secondary Schools.

== Provincial representative rugby ==
The King Country team play home matches at Rugby Park, Te Kūiti, Owen Delany Park, Taupō and Taumarunui Domain, Taumarunui.

=== National Provincial Championship (NPC) ===
In 1996, King Country were in the first division of the NPC but in subsequent years struggled and in just 6 years were in the third division.

=== Heartland Championship ===
Heartland Championship Results
Year	Pld	W	D	L	PF	PA	PD	BP	Pts	Place	Playoffs		
Year	Pld	W	D	L	PF	PA	PD	BP	Pts	Place	Qual	SF	F
2006	5	0	2	3	77	92	−15	2	6	6th	Lochore Cup	Won 17–15 against Thames Valley	Lost 34–46 to Poverty Bay
2007	5	3	0	2	88	66	+22	2	14	3rd	No	—	
2008	5	3	0	2	119	96	+23	2	14	3rd	No	—	
2009	5	2	0	3	100	111	−11	2	10	5th	Lochore Cup	Lost 27–31 to North Otago	—
2010	5	1	0	4	76	119	−43	2	6	5th	No	—	
2011	8	1	0	7	150	281	−131	1	5	11th	No	—	
2012	8	1	0	7	178	230	−52	5	9	11th	No	—	
2013	8	3	0	5	163	211	−48	3	15	9th	No	—	
2014	8	5	0	3	196	176	+20	5	25	5th	Lochore Cup	Lost 6–37 to Wanganui	—
2015	8	4	1	3	245	192	+53	3	21	7th	Lochore Cup	Won 20–6 against Buller	Won 47–34 against North Otago
2016	8	4	2	2	236	170	−66	5	25	6th	Lochore Cup	Won 48-26 against Poverty Bay	Lost 22-44 to North Otago
2017	8	1	0	7	206	323	−117	8	12	10th	No	—	
2018	8	6	0	2	303	229	+72	7	31	3rd	Meads Cup	Lost 21-58 to South Canterbury	—
2019	7	2	0	5	172	230	−58	5	13	10th	No	—	
2021	8	0	0	8	113	367	−254	1	1	12th	No	—	
2022	8	5	0	3	218	201	+17	5	25	4th	Meads Cup	Lost 9-76 to South Canterbury	—
2023	8	3	0	5	175	248	−73	4	16	10th	No	—	
2024	8	5	0	3	276	179	+97	8	28	5th	Lochore Cup	Won 34-31 against Ngati Porou East Coast	Won 46-44 against West Coast
2025	8	2	0	6	259	234	+25	5	15	9th	No	—	
2026	8	6	0	2	363	215	+148	8	32	3rd	Meads Cup	Won 36-24 against North Otago	Won 24-14 against Mid Canterbury

There was no Heartland Championship in 2020 due to Covid 19 restrictions.

=== Ranfurly Shield ===
King Country have never held the Ranfurly Shield. The union has challenged unsuccessfully for the Shield 22 times.

Year	Holder	Score	Challenger	Venue
1922	Hawke's Bay	42–8	King Country	Napier
1933	Canterbury	36–0	King Country	Christchurch
1952	Waikato	18–8	King Country	Hamilton
1958	Taranaki	15–11	King Country	New Plymouth
1961	Auckland	17–3	King Country	Auckland
1964	Taranaki	21–0	King Country	New Plymouth
1966	Auckland	14–6	King Country	Auckland
1969	Hawke's Bay	19–16	King Country	Napier
1971	North Auckland	16–6	King Country	Whangārei
1979	North Auckland	21–6	King Country	Whangārei
1980	Auckland	29–3	King Country	Auckland
1981	Waikato	22–9	King Country	Hamilton
1985	Canterbury	33–0	King Country	Christchurch
1988	Auckland	28–0	King Country	Te Kūiti
1990	Auckland	58–3	King Country	Auckland
1992	Auckland	42–15	King Country	Taupō
1994	Waikato	45–10	King Country	Hamilton
1998	Waikato	76–0	King Country	Hamilton
2012	Taranaki	67–16	King Country	Inglewood
2016	Waikato	55–0	King Country	Matamata
2024	Hawke's Bay	57–7	King Country	Hastings
2025	Taranaki	78–7	King Country	New Plymouth

=== Matches against visiting international teams ===
King Country Rugby Union has a long history of playing against visiting international teams and playing them competitively. For a number of these games, King Country paired up with neighbouring unions.

Year	Date	Home team	Opposition	Score	Venue
1925	16 September 1925	Waikato/King Country	New South Wales	16–19	Taumarunui
1930	2 August 1930	Waikato/Thames Valley/King Country	British Isles	16–40	Hamilton
1931	23 September 1931	Waikato/King Country	Australia	10–30	Hamilton
1937	28 August 1937	Waikato/Thames Valley/King Country	South Africa	3–6	Rugby Park, Hamilton
1939	30 August 1939	King Country	Fiji	9–14	Taumarunui
1946	24 August 1946	Taranaki/King Country	Australia	8–9	Pukekura Park, New Plymouth
1949	17 August 1949	King Country	Australia	6–24	Taumarunui
1950	15 July 1950	Waikato/Thames Valley/King Country	British Isles	0–30	Rugby Park, Hamilton
1952	20 August 1952	King Country	Australia	6–16	Island Reserve, Ōtorohanga
1954	17 July 1954	King Country	NSW Country	9–9	Island Reserve, Ōtorohanga
1955	14 September 1955	Wanganui/King Country	Australia	8–38	Cooks Gardens, Whanganui
1956	8 August 1956	Wanganui/King Country	South Africa	16–36	Spriggens Park, Whanganui
1957	31 July 1957	King Country	Fiji	26–14	Taumarunui Domain, Taumarunui
1959	19 August 1959	King Country/Counties	British Lions	5–25	Taumarunui Domain, Taumarunui
1963	27 April 1963	King Country	Queensland Rugby Union	24–6	Taumarunui Domain, Taumarunui
1965	4 August 1965	Wanganui/King Country	South Africa	19–24	Cooks Gardens, Whanganui
1966	10 August 1966	Wanganui/King Country	British Lions	12–6	Cooks Gardens, Whanganui
1968	31 July 1968	King Country	France	9–23	Taumarunui Domain, Taumarunui
1970	24 June 1970	King Country	New South Wales	13–15	Taumarunui Domain, Taumarunui
1971	26 May 1971	Wanganui/King Country	British Lions	9–22	Spriggens Park, Whanganui
1972	23 August 1972	King Country	Australia	6–13	Taumarunui Domain, Taumarunui
1974	14 August 1974	King Country	Fiji	3–38	Taumarunui Domain, Taumarunui
1975	23 July 1975	King Country	Tonga	13–18	Taumarunui Domain, Taumarunui
1977	1 June 1977	Wanganui/King Country	British Lions	9–60	Taumarunui Domain, Taumarunui
1979	14 April 1979	King Country	Victoria Rugby Union	12–18	Island Reserve, Ōtorohanga
1981	27 May 1981	King Country	Scotland	13–39	Taumarunui Domain, Taumarunui
1983	20 August 1983	King Country	Australia U21	–	Taumarunui Domain, Taumarunui
1985	1 May 1985	King Country	Queensland Rugby Union	7–18	Rugby Park, Te Kūiti
1989	5 July 1989	King Country	Argentina	4–9	Owen Delany Park, Taupō
1991	1 May 1991	King Country	Western Samoa	12–21	Rugby Park, Te Kūiti
1991	29 May 1991	King Country	Romania	6–28	Taumarunui Domain, Taumarunui
1991	18 June 1991	King Country	Soviet Union	15–22	Rugby Park, Te Kūiti
1992	13 May 1992	King Country	Australian Capital Territories	18–12	Island Reserve, Ōtorohanga
1992	1 July 1992	King Country	Tonga	30–8	Taumarunui Domain, Taumarunui
1993	24 July 1993	King Country	Manu Samoa	21–57	Rugby Park, Te Kūiti
1994	23 June 1994	King Country	South Africa	10–46	Owen Delany Park, Taupō
1996	11 June 1996	King Country	Manu Samoa	20–27	Rugby Park, Te Kūiti
1997	6 June 1997	King Country	Ireland A	32–26	Owen Delany Park, Taupō
1997	13 June 1997	King Country	Cook Islands	64–5	Owen Delany Park, Taupō

=== Player records ===
Statistic	Value	Player	Year(s)
Most appearances	146	Paul Mitchell	1988–2001
Most points	925	Hutana Coffin	1983–1995
Most tries	46	Murray Kidd	1974–1984
Most conversions	148	Hutana Coffin	1983–1995
Most penalty goals	178	Hutana Coffin	1983–1995
Most dropped goals	27	Ian Ingham	1959–1970
Most points in a season	230	Hutana Coffin	1992
Most tries in a season	11	Dave Flavell Simon Bradley	1981 1992
Most conversions in a season	40	Hutana Coffin	1992
Most penalty goals in a season	45	Hutana Coffin	1992
Most dropped goals in a season	8	Ian Ingham	1966
Most points in a match	33	Hutana Coffin	1992
Most tries in a match	4	Jason Wells	1992
Most conversions in a match	10	Hutana Coffin	1992
Most penalty goals in a match	7	Lee Peina	2000

=== Top points scorers ===
Rank	Player	Games	Points
1	Hutana Coffin	137	925
2	Michael Blank	60	402
3	Patrick Hedley	29	334
4	Tony Gordon	44	302
5	Lee Peina	69	297
6	Ian Ingham	119	250
7	Zayn Tipping	71	248

=== Top try scorers ===
Rank	Player	Games	Tries
1	Murray Kidd	108	46
2	Dean Church	73	41
3	Dion Mathews	77	39
4	Dave Flavell	81	34
4	Simon Bradley	99	34
6	Colin Meads	139	32
7	Paul Mitchell	146	27
8	Glynn Meads	113	24
9	Cliff Crossman	38	23
10	Chris Wills	104	22
10	Paul Olsen	43	22
10	Liam Rowlands	62	22

== All Blacks ==
There have been eight players selected for the New Zealand national team (the All Blacks) while playing for King Country. The most famous King Country All Black is All Black of the Century Colin Meads.

- Kevin Boroevich
- Ron Bryers
- Phil Coffin
- Jack McLean
- Colin Meads
- Stanley Meads
- Bill Phillips
- Graham Whiting

== International players ==
Former England captain and coach Martin Johnson played for King Country, during his early career in 1989 and 1990 and was selected for the 1990 New Zealand Colts. Former Wales hooker Garin Jenkins also spent a spell playing for the province and the Taupo United club in 1988.

== Super Rugby ==
King Country along with Waikato, Counties Manukau, East Coast, Bay of Plenty, Thames Valley and Taranaki make up the Chiefs region.
