= Brendon O'Connor =

New Zealand rugby union player (born 1989)

- Born: Brendon Ryan O'Connor; 11 September 1989 (age 37) Gisborne, New Zealand
- Height: 1.86 m (6 ft 1 in)
- Weight: 102 kg (16 st 1 lb)
- School: Gisborne Boys' High School

Rugby union career
- Position: Flanker
- Current team: Rugby New York
Senior career
Years	Team	Apps	(Points)
2010–2011	Canterbury	17	(15)
2012	Crusaders	2	(0)
2013–2015	Hawke's Bay	34	(80)
2013–2015	Blues	42	(5)
2015–2019	Leicester Tigers	73	(55)
2019–2021	Hawke's Bay	25	(25)
2021	Crusaders	1	(5)
2022–	Rugby New York	25	(20)
2010–	Total	219	(205)
- Correct as of 28 June 2023
International career
Years	Team	Apps	(Points)
2009	New Zealand U20	5	(0)
- Correct as of 13 February 2013

Brendon O'Connor (born 11 September 1989) is a New Zealand rugby union player, who plays as flanker for Rugby New York (Ironworkers) in Major League Rugby (MLR). He previously played for Canterbury and Hawke's Bay in New Zealand's domestic National Provincial Championship competition and for the Crusaders and Blues in Super Rugby. Between 2015 and 2019 he played for Leicester Tigers in England's Premiership Rugby.

O'Connor won the 2009 IRB Junior World Championship with New Zealand Under 20. In 2012, O'Connor was a member of the Crusaders Wider Training Group and made two Super Rugby appearances that season. He was signed for the Blues for the 2013 season. O'Connor would go on to win over 40 Super Rugby caps for the Blues, winning the Blues MVP Award and Player's Player award in 2015. He has also played for Hawke's Bay in the ITM Cup. He had previously played for Canterbury in 2010 and 2011.

O'Connor joined English club Leicester Tigers for the 2015-2016 Aviva Premiership season. O'Connor made his debut for Leicester Tigers on 13 November 2015 in the opening match of the European Rugby Champions Cup at Welford Road. O'Connor impressed on his debut, winning crucial turnovers, and scoring a try. On 15 May 2019 he was announced as one of the players to leave Leicester following the end of the 2018–19 Premiership Rugby season.

On 7 June 2019, O'Connor re-signed with Hawke's Bay in New Zealand.

In January 2022, Rugby New York announced that O'Connor would join the club to play in the Major League Rugby competition.

O'Connor is qualified to represent England at international level through his grandmother.
