= James Wilson (rugby union, born 1983) =

NZ rugby union player

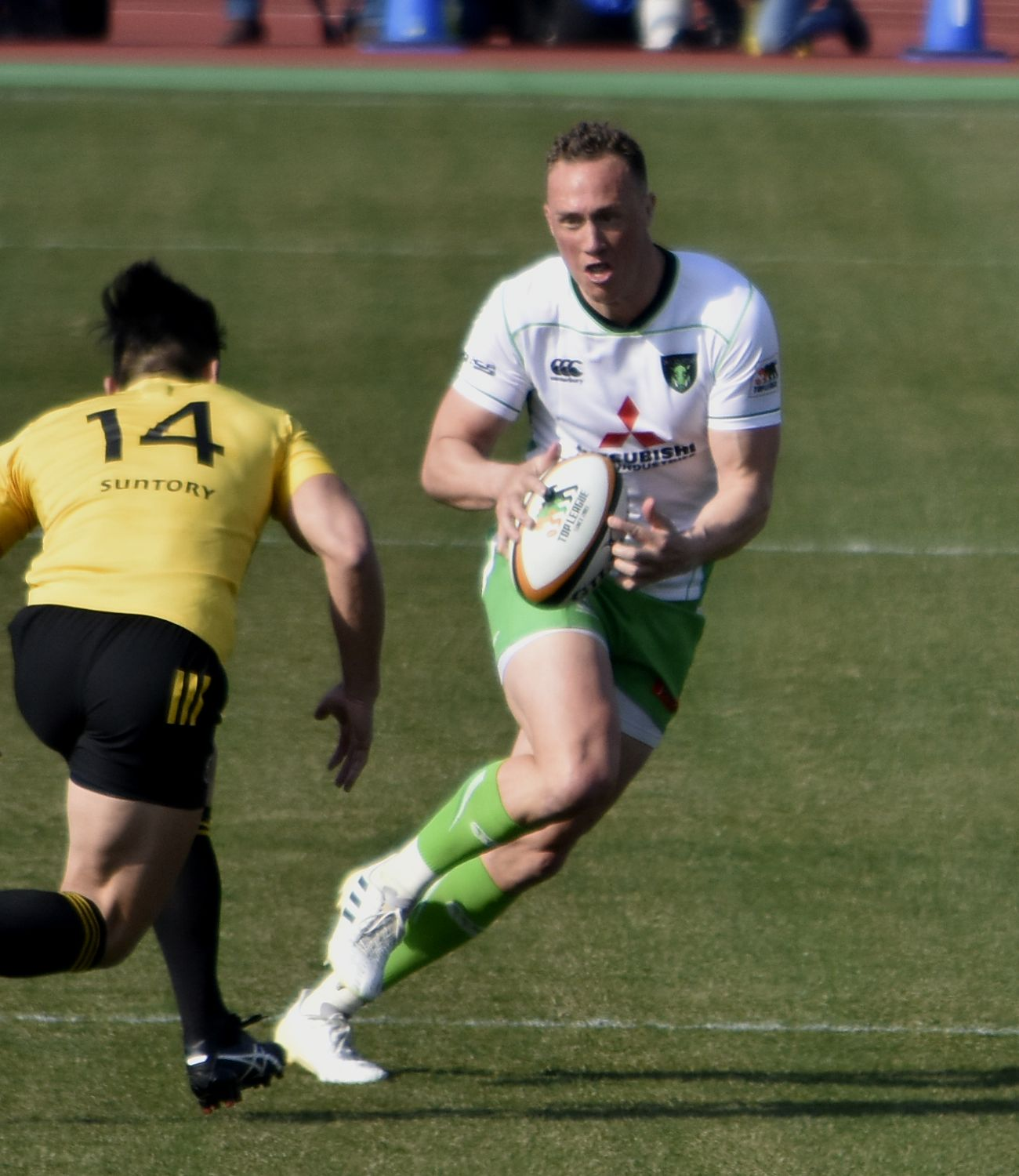
- Born: James William Rangi Wilson; 7 July 1983 (age 43) Invercargill, New Zealand
- Height: 1.96 m (6 ft 5 in)
- Weight: 102 kg (16 st 1 lb)
- School: Southland Boys' High School

Rugby union career
- Position(s): First five-eighth, Centre, Fullback
Senior career
Years	Team	Apps	(Points)
2003–2018	Southland	75	(307)
2004	Brumbies	8	(0)
2007–2008	Highlanders	17	(41)
2009	Chiefs	1	(0)
2011–2012	Bourgoin	17	(25)
2012–2017	Northampton Saints	93	(138)
2017	Bedford Blues	2	(0)
2017–2020	Bath	22	(33)
2018	Southland	9	(53)
2019–2021	Mitsubishi Dynaboars	14	(59)
- Correct as of 21 February 2021

James William Rangi Wilson (born 7 July 1983) is a retired professional rugby union player from New Zealand.

In 2003 Southland introduced Wilson to the NPC when he played against Marlborough. Having played for Southland for eight seasons he has been able to score over 200 points for his union, 82 of those in Ranfurly Shield challenges making him leader of the all-time shield points scorer for Southland. He left Southland for France at the end of the 2011 season playing 65 matches in total.

After the Air New Zealand Cup season in 2006 in which Wilson lead the team in tries, Wilson's name had come into contention for the Highlanders 2007 Super 14 season. He eventually got called into the squad as a replacement player, being an accomplished goal kicker also helped his causes. He was a regular starter of the Highlanders Super 14 Squad in 2008, playing mostly at 10, and in 2009 a member of the Chiefs squad who eventually lost the 2009 Super Rugby final to the Bulls.

Immediately post the 2011 NPC season with Southland, Wilson had signed a two-year deal with ProD2 side CSBJ in France. Wilson was used initially at 15 for the first half of his first season but eventually made his way in to lead the team at 10 with strong showings at 12 also. Wilson would only play the one season in France, he would join English Premiership side Northampton Saints after the summer break.

Wilson joined Northampton Saints for the 2012–13 season making his Premiership debut starting at 15 against Worcester Warriors. Wilson making an immediate impact at his new club, scoring a brace of tries in only his second appearance. Wilson went on to scoring 4 tries in 13 appearances, playing in a number of positions throughout, finishing the 2012–13 season starting the Aviva Premiership Final against Leicester Tigers wearing the 13 jersey.

The utility back also came off the bench in Saints' historic Aviva Premiership title winning final in 2014 and their European Challenge Cup win that same season.

Wilson also helped Saints' second team the Northampton Wanderers reach the Aviva 'A' League final where they beat Gloucester United to lift the trophy.

It was announced on 6 May 2017 that Wilson would leave Saints at the conclusion of the 2016/17 season.

Wilson joined Bath Rugby for the 2017-18 season, going on to make 20 appearances. At the end of the season, Wilson returned to his home town club of Southland Rugby for the summer of 2018. In November 2018, Wilson rejoined Bath Rugby on a contract until the end of the season.

It was announced on 29 April 2019 that Wilson would leave Bath and the end of the 2018/19 season and join the Mitsubishi Dynoboars for the 2019/20 season.

Wilson revealed on Instagram that he would be retiring from professional rugby at the end of the 2021 season. He has since begun a role as assistant coach of his hometown team Rugby Southland.
