= Ryan Tongia =

PNG international rugby league & union footballer

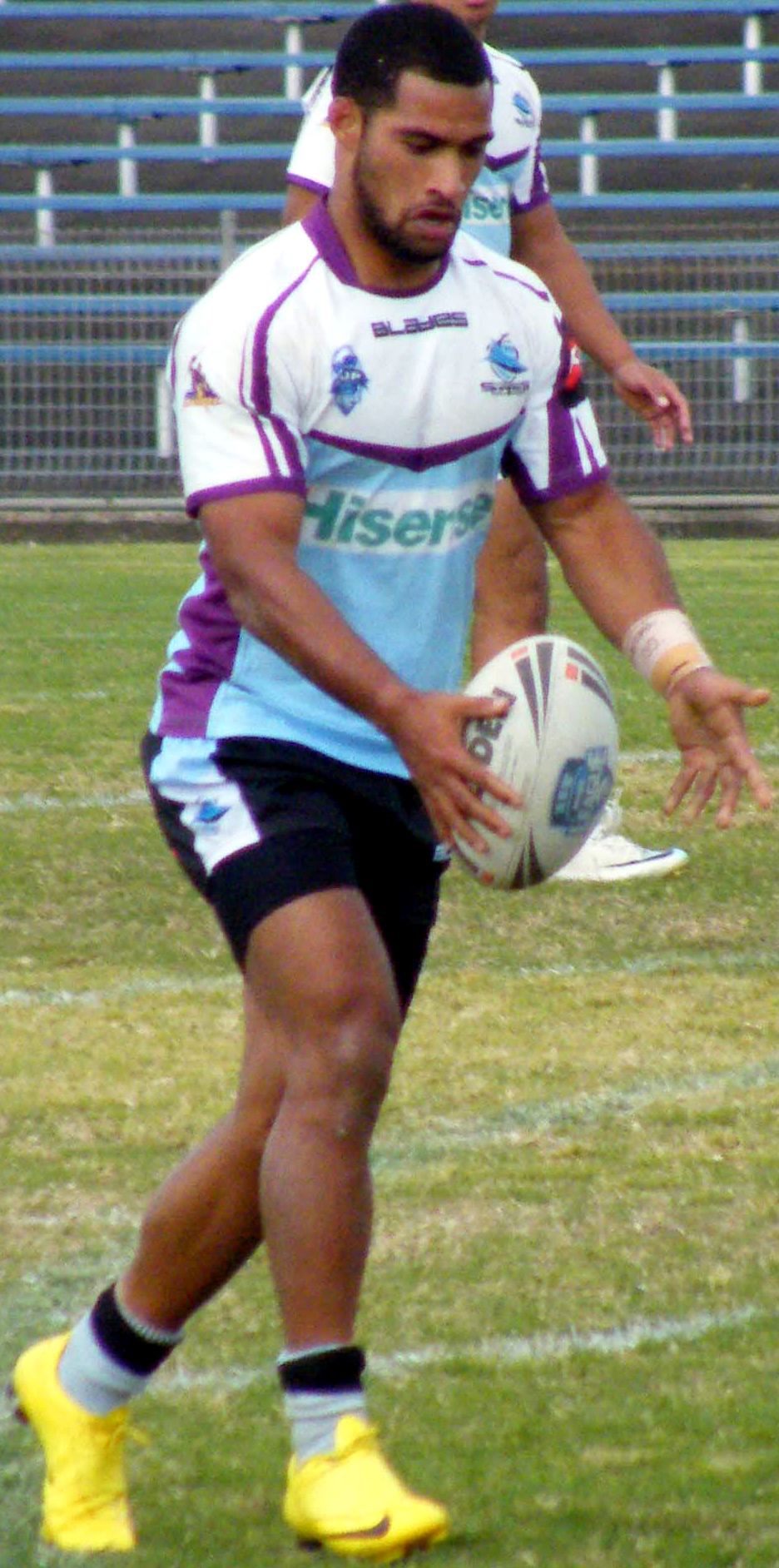

Personal information
- Born: Ryan Phillip Tongia; 31 May 1990 (age 36) Brisbane, Queensland, Australia
- Height: 1.80 m (5 ft 11 in)
- Weight: 86 kg (13 st 8 lb; 190 lb)

Playing information
- Position: Fullback, Wing
Club
Years	Team	Pld	T	G	FG	P
2011	Wakefield Trinity	4				8
Representative
Years	Team	Pld	T	G	FG	P
2010	PNG Prime Minister's XIII	1				6
2010	Papua New Guinea	2				4

Rugby union career
- Position(s): Wing, Fullback, Center
- Current team: Waikato
Senior career
Years	Team	Apps	(Points)
2014–2016	Hawke's Bay	31	(95)
2015–2016	Highlanders	4	(20)
2016−2017	Bayonne	6	(0)
2017	Agen	6	(0)
2017	Southland	9	(3)
2021	Waikato	4	(5)
- Correct as of 20 November 2021

Ryan Tongia (born 31 May 1990 in Brisbane) is a professional rugby league and rugby union footballer. He is currently based out of Hawke's Bay in New Zealand. Tongia is of Papua New Guinean, Chinese and German descent, but was born and raised in Australia. His position is right or left wing, or fullback. He is a Papua New Guinea rugby league international.

== Playing career ==
During his time playing rugby league for the Gold Coast Titans, Tongia did not play first grade but played in the Toyota Cup. He played two matches for Papua New Guinea in the 2010 Rugby League Four Nations. Tongia also played for the Wakefield Trinity Wildcats in 2011.

=== 2014–16 ===
Being unsuccessful on securing an NRL contract, Tongia made the decision to switch to rugby union in late 2013. He took part in the Noosa International Sevens tournament at the end of 2013, impressing enough people to be invited to the Australian sevens training camp. He then moved to New Zealand, in July 2014, it was announced that Tongia had signed a one-season contract with Hawke's Bay for 2014 after impressing at club rugby level. He became a key member and a star performer in their ITM Cup campaign, winning the Ranfurly Shield and making the Championship final. He also was the competition's leading overall top try-scorer, scoring 10 tries. It saw Tongia achieve a Super Rugby contract, after signing with Dunedin-based franchise the Highlanders for two years as a member of their wider training group.

Tongia was cited for foul play during a trial match for the Highlanders prior to the 2015 Super Rugby season. He was alleged for dangerous tackling when he tackled Robbie Coleman in the air against the Brumbies in January. The referee for the match, Matt O'Brien, issued a red card for the incident which occurred in the 59th minute. Tongia was cleared of foul play, the red card was later removed from his record and would face no further punishment after it was revealed it was an incorrect call. He made his Super Rugby debut in the wing position against the Cheetahs. He scored twice within 18 minutes of kick-off after a 45–24 victory.

=== 2017–19 ===
After a brief stint for the Agen club in France to play Pro14 rugby, Tongia joined Southland.

=== 2021 ===
On 23 October 2021, Tongia debuted for Waikato in the National Provincial Championship at fullback in their unsuccessful Ranfurly Shield challenge against Hawke's Bay at McLean Park, Napier.
