= Whakarua Park =

Sports facility in Ruatoria, New Zealand

- Interactive map of Whakarua Park
- Location: Ruatoria, Gisborne District, New Zealand
- Coordinates: 37.8887°S 178.3230°E
- Capacity: 3,000
- Surface: Grass

Tenant
- East Coast Ngāti Porou

Whakarua Park is a sports facility which is located on Whakarua Park Road in Ruatoria, Gisborne, New Zealand. The main sport that is played is rugby union, being the home ground of the East Coast Rugby Football Union, known as Ngāti Porou East Coast, who play in the Heartland Championship and formerly played in the National Provincial Championship's Second and Third divisions.

== History ==
It has been used by the East Coast Rugby Football Union since it split from the Poverty Bay Rugby Football Union in 1922. Since then it has hosted numerous notable games including two Ranfurly Shield matches in 1997 against Auckland and in 2013 against Waikato. On both occasions East Coast suffered heavy losses.

Whakarua Park also hosted the 1999 NPC Third Division final between East Coast and Poverty Bay in which the Ngāti Porou won 18–15. The 2000 NPC Third Division saw East Coast defeat Wairarapa Bush 18–17, however they would go on to lose the final at Centennial Park in Oamaru against North Otago.

More recently, one of the semifinals and the final of the 2012 Heartland Championship took place in Whakarua Park as East Coast went on to win the championship for the first time since the disestablishment of the NPC in 2006.

Ahead of the 2016 Super Rugby season, the Hurricanes prepared during preseason in Ruatoria and Gisborne.

== See also ==
- East Coast Rugby Football Union
- Heartland Championship
