= McLean Park =

Sports ground

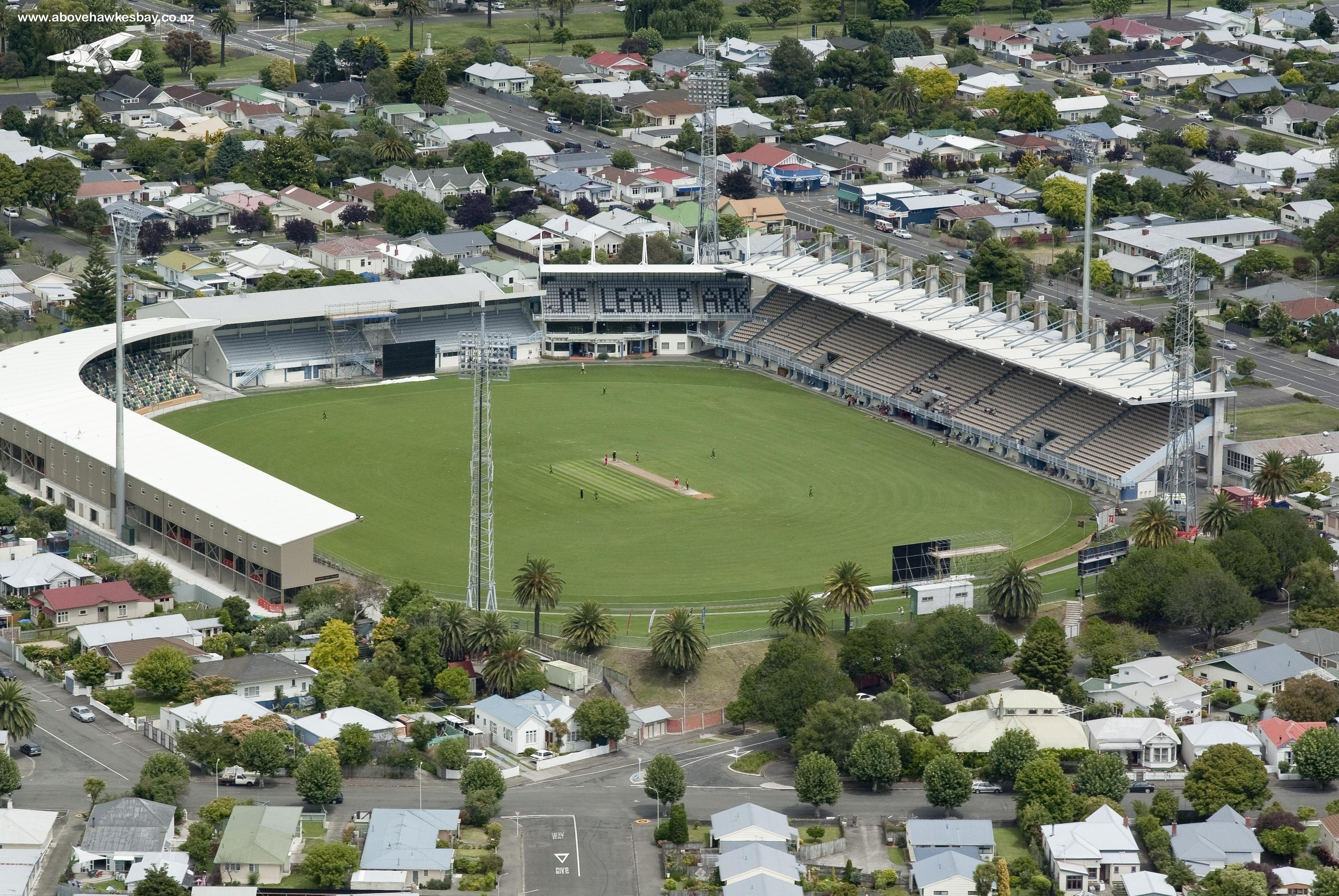
- Interactive map of McLean Park

Ground information
- Location: Napier, New Zealand
- Country: New Zealand
- Coordinates: 39°30′7″S 176°54′46″E
- Establishment: 1911
- Capacity: 19,700
- Owner: Napier City Council
- Operator: Napier City Council
- Tenants: Hurricanes (Super Rugby); Hawke's Bay Rugby Union (ITM Cup); Central Stags (State Championship/State Shield/State Twenty20)
- Website: mcleanpark.co.nz
- End names
- Centennial stand end Embankment end

International information
- First men's Test: 16–21 February 1979: New Zealand v Pakistan
- Last men's Test: 26–28 January 2012: New Zealand v Zimbabwe
- First men's ODI: 19 March 1983: New Zealand v Sri Lanka
- Last men's ODI: 19 November 2025: New Zealand v West Indies
- First men's T20I: 3 January 2017: New Zealand v Bangladesh
- Last men's T20I: 27 December 2023: New Zealand v Bangladesh
- First women's ODI: 17 January 1982: India v International XI
- Last women's ODI: 14 December 2022: New Zealand v Bangladesh
- Only women's T20I: 30 March 2021: New Zealand v Australia

Team information
Central Districts	(1952)
- As of 27 December 2023; Source: Cricinfo

McLean Park is a sports ground in Napier, New Zealand. The two main sports played at the ground are cricket and rugby union. It is one of the largest cricket grounds in New Zealand.

McLean Park is a sports ground of international standards which includes the main outdoor stadium and the indoor Rodney Green Centennial Events Centre. The home teams for this ground are the Hawke's Bay Rugby Union and Central Districts Cricket Association. The two ends of the stadium are named the Centennial Stand End and Embankment End. Its close proximity to the International Date Line makes it the world's easternmost Test match ground.

== Ground ==
McLean Park is on Latham Street in Napier South, about one kilometre south of the Napier CBD. It was initially named 'Sir Donald McLean Park' by an act of Parliament after Sir Douglas McLean (also spelt Maclean) donated ten acres of land as a memorial to his father in 1910.

In cricket, the ground is primarily a one-day venue with square dimensions that allow attacking batsmen to score freely especially in the opening overs. There are four covered stands and a large grass bank opposite the Centennial Stand. The wicket tends to become slower throughout the day therefore captains prefer to set targets on this pitch. It has held first-class matches since 1952 and ten Tests since 1979. New Zealand's Test record at the ground is seven draws, one win and two losses. It has held at least one one-day international every season since 1990. The ground has a capacity of 19,700.

== Usage ==
=== Cricket ===
The ground is used for hosting all formats. The first ODI played here was between New Zealand and Sri Lanka in Rothman's Cup of 1982/83. In this match New Zealand defeated Sri Lanka by 7 wickets.

=== Rugby Union ===
McLean Park is the home stadium of the Hawkes Bay Magpies in the Mitre 10 Cup. It has also hosted several New Zealand Maori games in the past. During the 1987 Rugby World Cup the stadium played host to the Pool 2 game between Canada and Tonga on 24 May 1987. At the 2011 Rugby World Cup, McLean Park was again chosen as a venue and hosted two games in Pool A, France vs. Canada on 18 September 2011 and Canada vs. Japan on 27 September 2011.

To date the stadium has only hosted two All Blacks tests. The first was played on 7 June 1996, when the All Blacks beat Western Samoa 51-10 on the Samoans' tour of New Zealand. This test has the distinction of being the first home test in which the All Blacks played under floodlights. The second test featuring the All Blacks took place on 6 September 2014. This was a round 3 clash in the Rugby Championship between the All Blacks and Argentina. The All Blacks won 28-9.

The stadium also serves as an alternative home venue for the Hurricanes franchise in Super Rugby. A total of 14 Super Rugby matches have been played at McLean Park, the first being on 15 March 1996, when the Hurricanes beat Transvaal by 32-16. In the aftermath of the 2011 Christchurch earthquake, the Crusaders used the stadium as a home ground for two matches against the Chiefs in 2011 and 2012.

=== Rugby League ===
Melbourne Storm Rugby league played an NRL game against St. George-Illawarra Dragons at the stadium on 25 July 2015. The ground hosted a New Zealand Warriors home game against the Brisbane Broncos on 27 May 2023, where unfortunately the New Zealand Warriors lost 22 - 26.

The ground will host a preseason New Zealand Warriors fixture against the Manly Warringah Sea Eagles on 14 February 2026.

== Redevelopments ==
After redevelopment of the park the Graham Lowe Stand opened on Saturday 1 August 2009 when the Hawke's Bay Magpies opened their Air New Zealand Cup campaign with a win against Auckland. Redevelopments took just one year to complete. The stand was built with the 2011 Rugby World Cup and the 2015 Cricket World Cup in prospect; both events included games at the ground. Drainage problems led two ODIs in January 2018 against Pakistan and against England in February 2018 to be moved. McLean Park made its international return with New Zealand playing India in January 2019.

== Statistics ==
=== Test matches ===
McLean Park is regarded as one of the most batting friendly wickets in the world. The average runs per wickets is 39.45 which is almost eight runs higher than Eden Park which, at 31.46 is the second most batting friendly wicket in New Zealand. No pitch throughout the world which has had more than five test matches has a higher runs per wicket. The batting friendly conditions means that it is hard to produce results here and seven of the ten tests played here have been draws with two losses by New Zealand, each featuring characteristic batting collapses. New Zealand won a lone test here against Zimbabwe in 2012.

The highest total set by a team here in Test cricket was by the New Zealand national cricket team when they scored 619/9 dec on 26 Mar 2009 against the Indian national cricket team. The most runs scored in this ground have been by Brendon McCullum (494 runs), Ross Taylor-420 runs and Jesse Ryder (317 runs). The most wickets have been taken by Chris Martin- 22 wickets, followed by Ian O'Brien-15 wickets and Jeetan Patel and Daniel Vettori- 14 wickets.

=== One Day Internationals ===
McLean Park also has been known as a good batting strip for one day cricket. The average runs per wicket is 30.66 while the average runs per over is 4.90. It has been known as a good ground for New Zealand with 20 of the 33 matches played having been won by the home side while two matches, both against England, were tied. Ricky Ponting has the highest individual score on the ground of 141 not out which came in a team score of 347/5. It was selected as a venue for the 2015 Cricket World Cup and hosted 3 matches.

In ODI cricket, the highest total has been set by the New Zealand national cricket team against the Zimbabwean national cricket team when they scored 373/8 on 9 Feb 2012. The most runs scored in this ground have been by Ross Taylor- 779 runs, followed by Nathan Astle and Stephen Fleming-(743 runs). The most wickets have been taken by Daniel Vettori-30 wickets-ahead of three players with 17.

=== Twenty20 Internationals ===
The first T20I at the venue was held on 3 January 2017, between New Zealand and Bangladesh. With that, McLean park became the sixth venue in New Zealand to host a T20 international.

== See also ==
- List of Test cricket grounds
