= Centennial Park, Oamaru =

Sports complex in Oamaru, New Zealand

Centennial Park
- Whitestone Contracting Stadium
- Interactive map of Centennial Park
- Location: Oamaru, New Zealand
- Coordinates: 45°4′12″S 170°59′3″E
- Capacity: 5,000 (approx)
- Surface: Grass

Tenants
- North Otago Rugby; North Otago Cricket

Centennial Park (known for sponsorship purposes as Whitestone Contracting Stadium) is a sports complex on Taward Street in Oamaru. The main sports played there are rugby union, cricket, and hockey. In 2007, the main ground was renamed Whitestone Contracting Stadium, after naming rights were granted to Whitestone Contracting Limited.

== Sports ==
=== Rugby union ===
It is the home ground for the Heartland Championship team North Otago. It has hosted NPC finals and semi-finals. One of the more notable finals was in 2002, when North Otago finished their successful season by beating Horowhenua-Kapiti 43–19. The last final held at Centennial Park was the 2007 Heartland Championship Meads Cup against Wanganui, with North Otago winning. The Highlanders also hold occasional pre-season matches at the ground.

=== Cricket ===
Centennial Park
- Interactive map of Centennial Park

Ground information
- Location: Oamaru
- Country: New Zealand

International information
- Only women's ODI: 19 January 2000: New Zealand v England
- As of 6 September 2020; Source: CricketArchive

The North Otago district cricket team play home matches at the cricket oval, which also hosts local club matches.
