= Westport RFC (New Zealand) =

NZ rugby union club, based in Westport, South Island

(New Zealand) Westport RFC
- Full name: Westport Rugby Football Club
- Nickname: Bumble Bees
- Founded: 1886; 140 years ago
- Location: Westport, New Zealand
- Ground: Patterson Park (Capacity: 5,000)
- President: (New Zealand) Gerald Hart
- Captain: (New Zealand) Nick Makea
- League(s): Buller Rugby Football Union Club Championships and Buller/West Coast Combined Club Championships
- 2009: 2nd
Team kit

Official website
- www.pitchero.com/clubs/westportrfc/

Westport RFC is a New Zealand rugby union team based in the South Island of New Zealand. The club should not be confused with the Westport Rugby Club of Ireland.

The Westport RFC is affiliated to both the Buller Rugby Football Union (its provincial parent union) and the New Zealand Rugby Union. Westport RFC players can be selected to Buller Provincial Representative teams, including the Buller NPC side, as well as being picked for New Zealand sides.

The men's first team play in the Buller Rugby Football Union premier club competition. The side also plays in a Buller/West Coast combined premier league.

== History ==
The Westport Rugby Football Club was founded in 1886. Originally the club participated in the West Coast Rugby Football Union competitions. With the logistical difficulties of playing teams from the lower West Coast the Westport club became instrumental in the founding of the Buller Rugby Football Union in the Northern part of the West Coast region in 1892 and have participated in Buller provincial competitions since this time.

In 2002, Westport RFC started putting a plan in place for mentors to guide young players to fully develop their potential.

== Records ==
The Westport RFC first team won the Buller Rugby Union club championships 8 years in a row from 1963 to 1970 which at the time was a New Zealand record for most consecutive wins of a provincial club championship. The record stood for many years until recently beaten by Paeroa West of the Thames Valley Rugby Football Union who won 9 in a row.

Westport have also won the Buller Championships 28 times, the most of any Buller club.

== Championships ==
Westport RFC has won the Buller Club Championships 28 times. Westport have also won the Buller/West Coast Combined competition 5 times since its inception in 1969.

Westport RFC - Buller Championships

1897, 1900, 1901, 1902, 1903, 1907, 1911, 1912, 1913, 1920, 1921, 1959, 1961, 1963, 1964, 1965, 1966, 1967, 1968, 1969, 1970, 1972, 1989, 1990, 1996, 1997, 1999, 2003

Westport RFC - Buller/West Coast Combined Championships

1969, 1989, 1990, 1997, 1998

== Notable players ==
All Blacks

Although up to 6 All Blacks have played for Westport RFC, there have officially been 2 Westport RFC players selected for the All Blacks whilst playing their club rugby for Westport at the time of selection. They are:

- (New Zealand) Samuel Bligh (1910 All Black)
- (New Zealand) Charles Mclean (1920 All Black)

NZ Maori All Blacks

There have been 2 Westport players selected for the New Zealand Maori Rugby team whilst playing their club rugby for Westport.

- (New Zealand) Tom French (1911, 1913 NZ Maori)
- (New Zealand) Sandy Webster (1888-89 NZ Natives)

Current Buller NPC Representative Players

- (New Zealand) Stephen Crackett (Prop)
- (New Zealand) Daniel Hooper (Flyhalf)
- (New Zealand) Nick Makea (Halfback)
- (Fiji) Mitieli Kaloudigibeci (Wing)

Other Notable Past Players

- (New Zealand) Brian Stack (1966 All Black reserve vs British Lions)
- (New Zealand) George Aitken Junior (1921 All Black captain who also played 8 tests for Scotland)
- (New Zealand) Clem Green (Selected in the 1910 All Blacks but could not tour due to work commitments)
- (New Zealand) Andrew Stephens (2008 NZ Divisional XV)
- (New Zealand) Tim Manawatu (NZ Divisional XV)
- (New Zealand) Thomas Stuart (Former record holder for most consecutive NPC appearances)

== Teams ==
As well as providing senior rugby, Westport RFC also has a junior rugby section which provides rugby for children of all ages. The junior section normally has teams in all age grades from Under 6 up to Under 18.
