= Becky Manawatu =

New Zealand writer

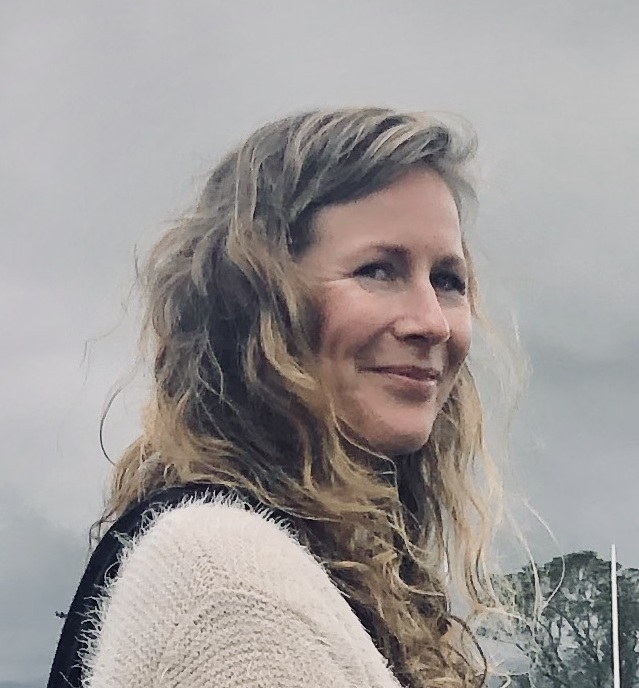
- Manawatu in 2020
- Born: Becky Wixon; 1982 (age 43–44); Nelson, New Zealand
- Education: Buller High School
- Occupation: Journalist
- Writing career
- Notable work: Auē
- Notable awards: Fiction and best first book of fiction, 2020 Ockham New Zealand Book Awards; Best crime novel and best first novel, Ngaio Marsh Awards

Becky Manawatu (born 1982) is a New Zealand writer. In 2020, she won two Ockham New Zealand Book Awards for her first novel, Auē and Best Crime Novel at the 2020 Ngaio Marsh Awards.

== Biography ==
Manawatu was born Becky Wixon in June 1982 in Nelson, New Zealand, and raised in Waimangaroa on the West Coast of the South Island, 15 minutes from Westport, attending Waimangaroa Primary School. She met her husband Tim while at Buller High School and has two children, Siena and Maddox. Manawatu left home at age 18 years to accompany her husband's career as a professional rugby player and coach in Italy and Frankfurt, Germany. The couple returned to New Zealand in 2016 to Nelson, where Manawatu began a Diploma in Writing at the Nelson Marlborough Institute of Technology. After six months the couple moved back to Waimangaroa, and Manawatu began working as a reporter at the Westport News, the smallest independent daily newspaper in New Zealand.

== Writing ==
Manawatu began writing her first novel, Auē, while living in Frankfurt, and first approached publisher Mary McCallum of Mākaro Press in April 2016. She continued it in Nelson under the working title Pluck, submitting three chapters to McCallum in November 2016 and a manuscript in January 2017; it eventually went through five rounds of editing over a year. Much of the novel was written in a family friend's house at the mouth of the Mōkihinui River north of Westport. A formative experience that led to the novel was the murder of Manawatu's 10-year-old cousin Glen Bo Duggan by his abusive stepfather when Manawatu was 11. The novel tells the story of eight-year-old orphan Arama sent to live with rural relatives at Kaikōura and his teenage brother Taukiri.

Manawatu was longlisted for the Commonwealth Writers Prize in 2018, and an essay of hers was selected for a Landfall anthology.

Auē was published by Mākaro Press in August 2019 in a run of 500 copies, and was launched at Whare Tangaroa, a clifftop house at Cape Foulwind. On 12 May 2020 it won the $55,000 Jann Medicott Acorn Prize for Fiction (New Zealand's richest literary prize), as well as the Hubert Church Prize for best first book of fiction, at the Ockham New Zealand Book Awards. It also won the Best Crime Novel and was shortlisted for the Best First Novel at the 2020 Ngaio Marsh Awards. The judges described it as "a breath-taking expose of lives lived on the margins, and the fight for redemption and absolution". Auē was the best-selling New Zealand novel of 2020 and 2021.

Manawatu won the 2021 Robert Burns Fellowship to work on her next novel, titled Papahaua, in Dunedin.

Her 2025 novel, Kataraina, was published by Scribe in Australia and Mākaro Press in New Zealand. In a review for The Guardian, Tara June Winch described it as "a wonder to read" and "a generous, expansive, masterful novel". Manawatu won the Keri Hulme Award in 2025 for Kataraina.

== Personal life ==
Manawatu is of Ngāi Tahu, Ngāti Mamoe, Waitaha and Pākehā background.
