= Peter Eastgate (rugby union) =

New Zealand rugby union player (1927–2007)

- Born: Barry Peter Eastgate; 10 July 1927 Nelson, New Zealand
- Died: 15 December 2007 (aged 80) Christchurch, New Zealand
- Height: 1.78 m (5 ft 10 in)
- Weight: 91 kg (201 lb)
- School: Hokitika District High School
- Occupation: Scrap metal dealer

Rugby union career
- Position: Prop
Provincial / State sides
| Years | Team | Apps | (Points) |
| 1947–1948 | West Coast | | |
| 1949–1954 | Canterbury | | |
International career
| Years | Team | Apps | (Points) |
| 1952–1954 | New Zealand | 3 | (0) |

Barry Peter Eastgate (10 July 1927 – 15 December 2007) was a New Zealand rugby union player. A prop, Eastgate represented West Coast and Canterbury at a provincial level, and was a member of the New Zealand national side, the All Blacks, from 1952 to 1954. He played 17 matches for the All Blacks including three internationals.
