= Maggie Rainey-Smith =

New Zealand writer

- Born: 1950 (age 75–76); Richmond, Nelson, New Zealand
- Occupation: Writer
- Website: maggieraineysmith.com

Maggie Rainey-Smith is a novelist, poet, short story writer, essayist and book reviewer. She lives in Wellington, New Zealand.

== Biography ==
Maggie Rainey-Smith was born in 1950 in Richmond, Nelson. Her father, Reginald Mervyn Rainey, had served with the 2nd NZ Expeditionary Force in World War II and was taken prisoner in Crete and held in Stalag VIIB in Poland.

She grew up in Richmond and later travelled widely overseas, including to the United States, England, Scotland and Norway, afterwards returning to New Zealand and setting up a recruitment consultancy business.

She completed a Bachelor of Arts in English literature in 2002 and has also completed the Aoraki Writing Course in Timaru under Owen Marshall in 2001, the Whitireia Advanced Diploma in Writing in 2003 and two undergraduate writing workshops at Victoria University of Wellington.

Her short stories, poems and travel essays have been published in anthologies, online and in journals such as Landfall, Sport, Headland, Takahe, NZ Listener, NZ Books, 4th Floor Literary Journal and Essential New Zealand Poems.

In November 2007, while researching for her next book, she spent some time in Greece and met Sir Patrick Leigh Fermor on the occasion of his Name Day celebration, a day on which he always opened his home in Kardamyli to the local villagers. After his death, she posted some of the photographs taken that day as a tribute to him and a memory of such a special day.

She has served as Chair of New Zealand Society of Authors (NZSA) Wellington, on the Randell Cottage Committee and on the committee of the Wellington Writers Walk. She volunteered for eight years to run a creative writing course in the library of a local women's prison and presented a paper on this experience ("Reading short stories in prison") at the Dan Davin Short Story Conference in Invercargill in September 2017.

She teaches ESOL Workplace English to migrants and refugees, and spent three months in Siem Reap in 2013 as a volunteer teacher.

She has two adult sons and lives with her husband in Wellington.

== Awards and prizes ==
Rainey-Smith's novel About Turns was the first New Zealand novel to be chosen by booksellers Whitcoulls as a Guaranteed Great Read.

She was joint runner up for the Landfall Essay Competition in 2013 and appeared at the Auckland Writers Festival in 2016.

== Bibliography ==
- About Turns (Random House, 2005)
- Turbulence (Random House, 2007)
- Eastbourne - an anthology, edited by Mary McCallum, Anne Manchester and Maggie Rainey-Smith (Mākaro Press, 2013)
- Daughters of Messene (Makaro Press, 2015)
- Formica (Cuba Press, 2022)
