= Robert Oliphant =

Robert Oliphant may refer to:

- Rob Oliphant (born 1956), Canadian politician and United Church minister
- Robert Oliphant (rugby union) (c. 1867–1956), New Zealand rugby union player
