= Jeffrey Paparoa Holman =

New Zealand poet and writer

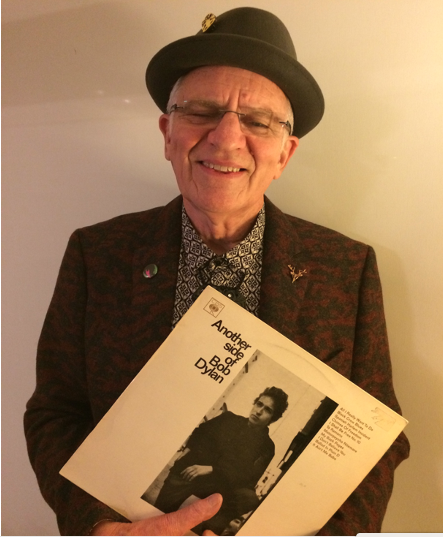
- Holman, 2017
- Born: Jeffrey Holman; 1947 (age 78–79) London, United Kingdom
- Occupation: Poet; writer; academic
- Education: University of Canterbury (PhD)

Jeffrey Paparoa Holman (born 1947) is a New Zealand poet, writer, and retired academic. He has published ten poetry collections, a historical non-fiction book and two memoirs, and has received several writing awards and residencies. He returned to his university studies in adulthood, completing his PhD in 2007 and becoming an advocate for lifelong learning. Many of his works feature elements of te reo Māori (the Māori language) and Māori culture, as well as focusing on his own history: growing up on the West Coast of New Zealand, labouring and working-class culture, and his relationship with his parents, particularly his father.

== Life and career ==
=== Early life and career: 1947–1996 ===
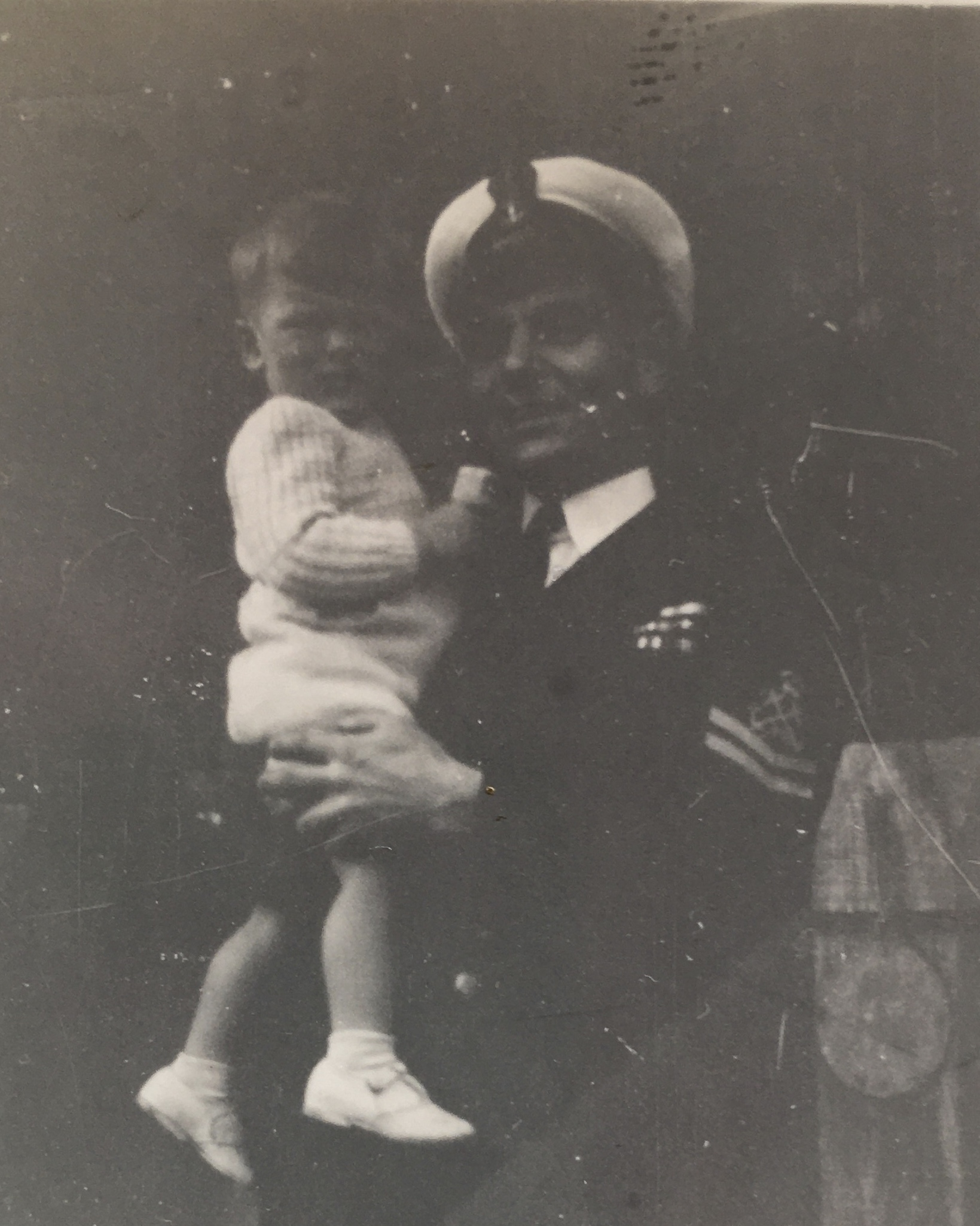
Holman with his father, 1949

Holman was born in London in 1947, and in 1950 moved to New Zealand with his family. His father had served in the Royal Navy on aircraft carriers in World War II and later suffered from drinking and gambling problems, related to the PTSD he suffered as a veteran. On Holman's mother's side, he is a great-nephew of the naval historian, Hector Charles Bywater. The family moved frequently due to Holman's father's unsettled lifestyle and two terms of imprisonment due to embezzlement committed to support his gambling addiction. Notable places in Holman's childhood included Devonport in Auckland and Blackball, a small town on the West Coast of the South Island. He later wrote of his experiences growing up in Blackball in the poetry collection The Late Great Blackball Bridge Sonnets (2004).

His first published poem, "Night" (1963), was dedicated to his English teacher (and, later, lifelong friend and mentor) Peter Hooper. After dropping out of high school in 1965 he attended university briefly, but did not graduate. During his career, Holman worked in a number of working class jobs including as a sawmill worker, a sheep-shearer in both Australia and New Zealand, a farmhand, a forestry worker, a rubbish man and a delivery driver. He returned to university in the early 1970s, but again did not graduate.

His first poetry collection, Strange Children, was published in the shared volume Two Poets (1974) in a collaboration with American poet David Walker. He subsequently worked as a psychiatric social worker at Seaview Hospital in Hokitika. Holman has said that his Christian faith (often expressed in his work) was revived, in profound spiritual experiences, after the death of his partner Lee in a road accident near Otira in the winter of 1978.

In 1987 Holman moved to London with his family, and worked for a time as a residential social worker followed by work as a bookseller. He adopted his middle name Paparoa while living in London in the mid-1990s, in tribute to the Paparoa Range. While in England, he read Ask That Mountain: The Story of Parihaka by historian Dick Scott, and decided to return to New Zealand and learn more about Māori culture. This experience led to his enrolment in Māori language classes, kapa haka group membership, and the study of New Zealand's colonial history.

=== Return to university: 1997–2010 ===
Holman returned to university for the third time in the late 1990s and completed a Bachelor of Arts with honours in English and Māori studies at the University of Canterbury. He studied te reo Māori (the Māori language) as part of his degree, which he said was something he "had wanted to do for a long time". He has spoken publicly about the importance to his life and writing of learning the language.

Since his 1998 poetry collection Flood Damage, Holman has published a number of poetry collections. The title poem of his 2002 poetry collection, As Big as a Father, received the 1997 Whitireia Prize. It was also shortlisted for the Poetry Prize at the Montana New Zealand Book Awards in 2003. The award's judges said his poems "are redolent of senses of the South Island's West Coast: arms wide spread, wind, seas, ruggedness". His poetry has been included in anthologies such as Essential New Zealand Poems (2001), Big Sky (2002), Land Very Fertile (2008) and Poetry New Zealand Yearbook 2021, and in magazines like the New Zealand Listener and Landfall.

In The Long Forgetting: Post-colonial literary culture in New Zealand, academic Patrick Evans said of Holman's 2004 collection The Late Great Blackball Bridge Sonnets:

Here, the lost world of West Coast coalmining is evoked in terms of ancestry, genealogy, kēhua, the spirit and above all as a tūrangawaewae [a place to stand], to produce an effect unimaginable through any other means: in this volume, Holman comes closer than any other Pākehā writer alive today to give meaning to the concept of 'becoming Māori'.

In 2007, Holman completed his PhD in Māori studies. His thesis Best of both world: Elsdon Best and the metamorphosis of Maori spirituality. Te painga rawa o ngā ao rua: Te Peehi me te putanga ke o te wairua Māori, examined the works of the ethnographer Elsdon Best. the same year he won the CLNZ Writers' Award, together with Martin Edmond, and received NZ$35,000 towards a non-fiction work. His subsequent work, Best of Both Worlds: The Story of Elsdon Best and Tutakangahau, which grew out of his PhD thesis, was published in 2010. In 2011 the work was shortlisted for the Ernest-Scott History prize in Australia.

=== Later career: 2011–present ===
After completing his PhD, Holman lectured part-time in English at the University of Canterbury and tutored at the Writers' Institute at Hagley Community College. He was also the lifelong learning coordinator at the University of Canterbury. In 2011 he was the writer in residence at the University of Waikato. In 2012, Creative New Zealand awarded him with a three-month residency at the University of Iowa. He wrote the Māori fiction section of Te Ara: The Encyclopedia of New Zealand, published online in October 2014. In 2014 Holman was awarded a Goethe-Institut scholarship to study in Germany.

In his 2013 work, The Lost Pilot, Holman wrote about his father's experiences in World War II facing a Japanese kamikaze attack and of his own later experiences travelling to Japan and meeting family members of the pilots who had died in the strike on HMS Illustrious in 1945. Helen Watson White, writing for Landfall, described it as "the book of a poet and scholar who adds spiritual illumination to a largely hidden subject". Mike Crean for The Dominion Post characterised the book as "part autobiography, part biography, part social analysis of the Japanese at war, part travelogue", and described Holman's writing as "brutal and beautiful, powerful and emotional".

In 2017, the collection Blood Ties was published, containing new and selected poems written by Holman over the previous five decades. Reviewer Siobhan Harvey for The New Zealand Herald described Holman as a "classic New Zealand author" and the collection as being a "luscious, long-overdue medley collecting the best of his poems". Murray Bramwell for the New Zealand Review of Books noted Holman "comes from the working world, and his poems affirm a sense of social justice and remembered hardship". He concluded that the book "is a richly rewarding collection in its range, its assured (and reassuring) voice and the deft vividness of its language". In the same review, Bramwell also discussed Holman's Dylan Junkie, a collection published the same year in tribute to the music of Bob Dylan, noting that there were "undoubtedly excellent stand-alone poems here, but Dylan Junkie is also inextricably connected to its host texts".

Holman's memoir, Now When it Rains, was published in 2018. Chris Else for Landfall noted the "rudderless course" of Holman's early life, followed by "academic success, a discovery of Māoritanga ... and publication and acclaim as a poet, a historian and a memoirist". He commented that the story "is enlivened throughout by Holman's eye for detail, his observations of the people he meets and his frank, often-ironic appraisal of his own weaknesses". Else suggested, however, that there was an absence of women in Holman's story, noting "if Holman's aim is to explore the process by which he became a writer, his relationships with the women he spent his adult life with can't be irrelevant". Nicholas Reid in the New Zealand Review of Books noted that the portrait of Holman's father in this book was "a little less positive than it was in his earlier memoir The Lost Pilot (2013), in which he allowed us to see why his father had become the way he was", and concluded the book was "a very readable and sincere autobiography by a man who has experienced a lot and has been able to put his heart into getting it down on paper".

In 2021 Holman's collection After Hours Trading & The Flying Squad was published. Paula Green described it as a book of two parts: "The first section retrieves invisible South Island histories while the second pays homage to wide ranging loves, other poets, friends, pressing concerns." Praising Holman's subject matter and use of language, she concluded that the collection "will echo and nourish as we move through uncertain days". Critic Steve Braunias named it as one of the five best collections of poetry published in New Zealand in 2021.

== Selected works ==
=== Poetry collections ===
- Strange Children (published as part of Two Poets, Pumpkin Press, 1974)
- Flood Damage (Ngā Kupu Press, 1998)
- As Big as a Father (Steele Roberts, 2002)
- The Late Great Blackball Bridge Sonnets (Steele Roberts, 2004)
- Fly Boy (Steele Roberts, 2010)
- Autumn Waiata (Cold Hub Press, 2010)
- Shaken Down 6.3 (Canterbury University Press, 2012)
- Blood Ties: New and Selected Poems (Canterbury University Press, 2017)
- Dylan Junkie (Mākaro Press, 2017)
- After Hours Trading & The Flying Squad (Carbide Press, 2021)

=== Non-fiction ===
- Best of Both Worlds: The Story of Elsdon Best and Tutakangahau (Penguin, 2010)
- The Lost Pilot: a memoir (Penguin, 2013)
- Now When it Rains: a writer's memoir (Steele Roberts, 2018)
