= Mike Gilbert (rugby) =

New Zealand international rugby union & league player

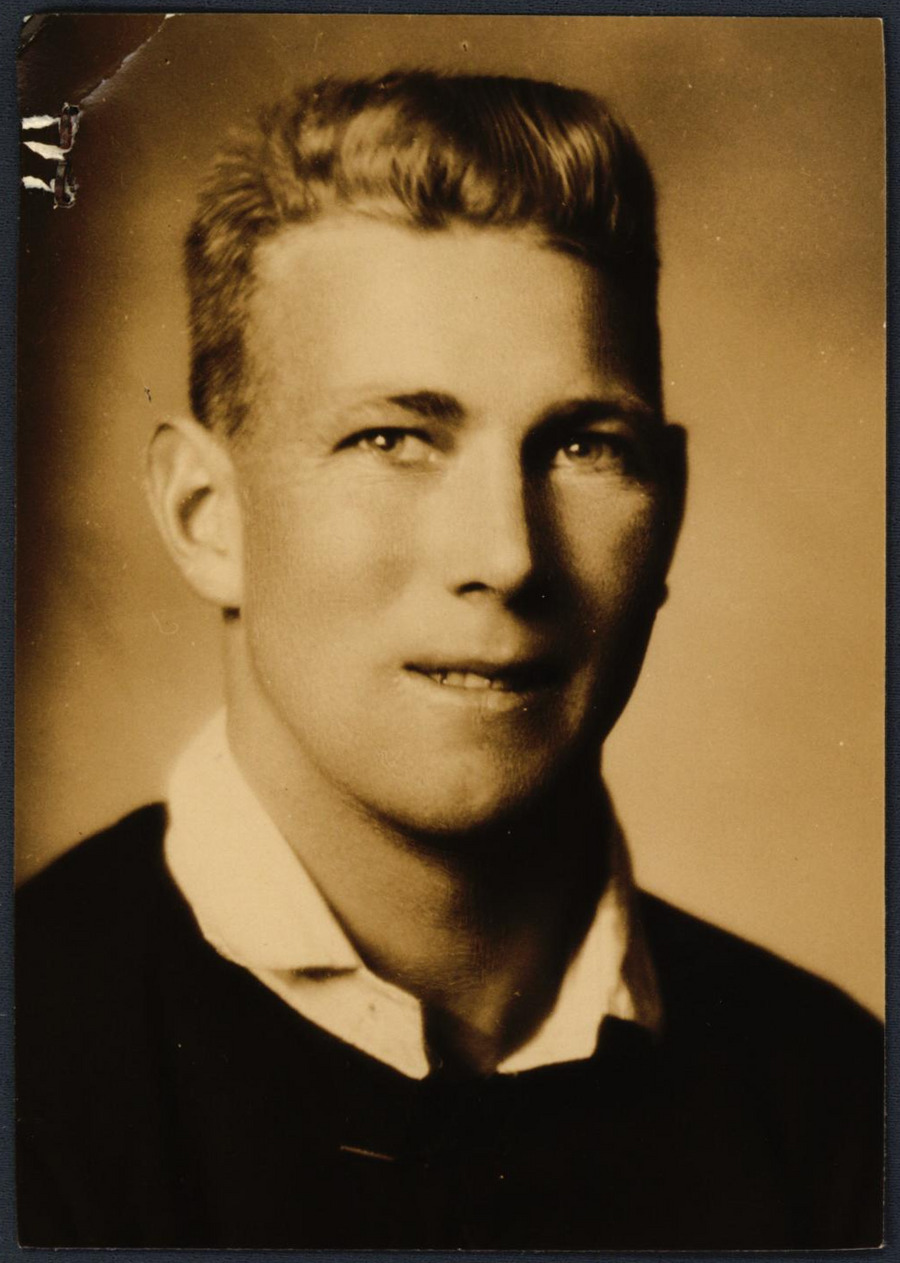
- Gilbert in 1935
- Born: Graham Duncan McMillan Gilbert; 1 March 1911 Rothesay, Bute, Scotland
- Died: 13 February 2002 (aged 90) Upper Hutt, New Zealand
- Height: 1.84 m (6 ft 0 in)
- Weight: 84 kg (185 lb)
- School: Westport Technical College

Rugby union career
- Position: Fullback
Provincial / State sides
Years	Team	Apps	(Points)
1930	Buller		
1931–1937	West Coast		
International career
Years	Team	Apps	(Points)
1935–1936	New Zealand	4	(20)
- Rugby league career

Playing information
- Position: Fullback
Club
Years	Team	Pld	T	G	FG	P
1938–1939	Bradford Northern

Graham Duncan McMillan "Mike" Gilbert (1 March 1911 – 13 February 2002) was a New Zealand rugby union and rugby league footballer. A rugby union fullback, Gilbert represented Buller and West Coast at a provincial level, and was a member of the New Zealand national side, the All Blacks, from 1935 to 1936. He played 27 matches for the All Blacks including four internationals.

He made his début for Buller as a 19-year-old in 1930. At one point in his career he played a few games as a centre.

Gilbert changed codes at the end of 1937, and travelled to England where he joined rugby league club Bradford Northern as a fullback in 1938. He returned to New Zealand following the outbreak of World War II in 1939 having become captain of the Bradford side. He was reinstated to rugby union in 1995.
