= Westport News =

New Zealand's Evening Newspaper

Coordinates: 41.757128°S 171.59946°E

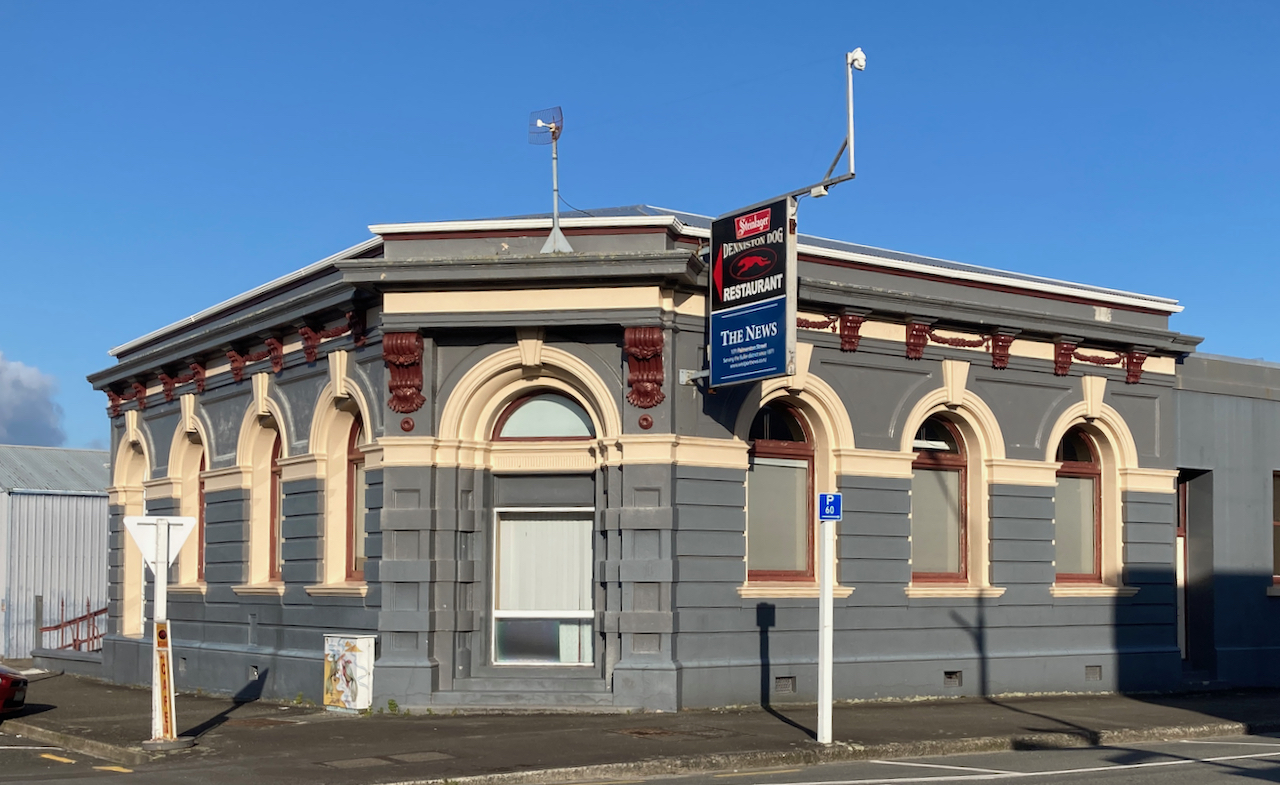
- Westport News office in former BNZ building
- Type: Monday–Friday daily newspaper
- Format: Broadsheet
- Founded: 1871
- Headquarters: Westport, New Zealand
- Website: wpn.co.nz

The Westport News is an independently-owned evening newspaper published in Westport, New Zealand. It is published on weekdays, and is one of New Zealand's smallest independent newspapers. The Westport News is distributed from Karamea in the north to Punakaiki in the south and as far inland as Reefton.

== History ==
In the 1860s Westport had two newspapers: the Westport Times and Buller Express, started by Job L. Munson and John Tyrell in December 1866, and the Westport Evening Star, started in December 1867. (These merged in 1892, becoming the daily Westport Times and Star, which became the Buller Times before ceasing publication in 1941.)

The Westport Evening Star was owned for a short time by Irishman Eugene O’Connor, who then set up the Westport News as a rival tri-weekly paper in 1873 (not 1871, as often claimed). It was initially printed on demy sheets. After several owners and name changes the Westport News was bought in April 1889 by Robert Reid, owner of the Greymouth Star, and enlarged to a double demy daily morning paper. Reid (and increasingly his wife Emma) ran the paper, until his death in March 1897. The News was then purchased by Boundy & Co., who sold it to Walter Atkin, former editor of the Lyell Times and Grey Valley Times, on 4 April 1898. Sherman Strachan became editor of the paper in 1899, and members of the Atkin family controlled the paper until 1945.

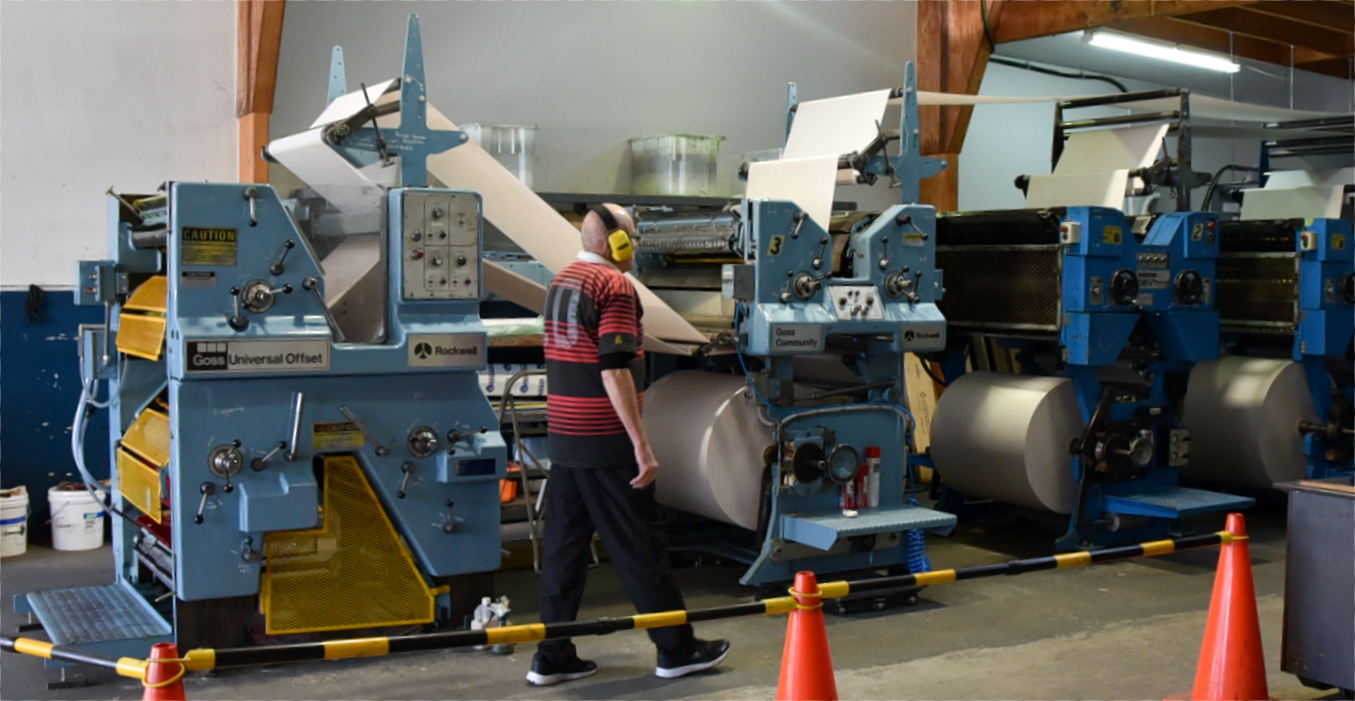
The press room

More than a dozen local newspapers were published in the West Coast in the 20th century, but the Westport News, Hokitika Guardian, and Greymouth Star were the only ones still operating in the 21st. The News published as a daily until 6 July 1961, when it was closed by its Christchurch owners. The Lucas family of Nelson, owners of the Nelson Evening Mail, immediately bought the paper and continued printing the next day. The printing of the paper now took place in Nelson, with copy wired from Westport by teleprinter and the papers flown from Nelson. Golden Coast Airways was formed to enable this, flying a twin-engined Aero Commander to Westport each weekday; the plane appearing over the main street told people the News was on its way. This arrangement continued until 1978, even while Westport was temporarily isolated by the 1968 Inangahua earthquake.

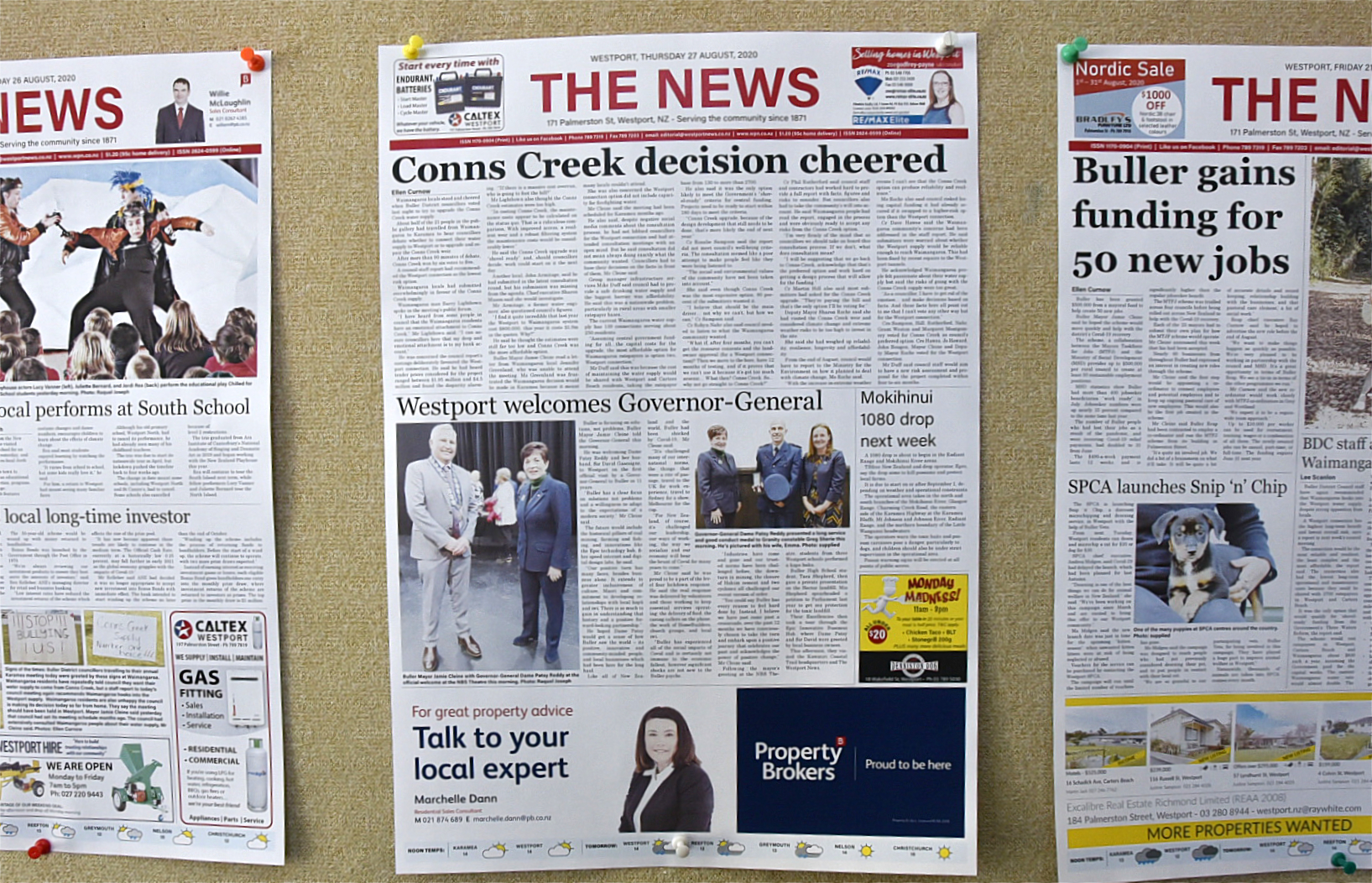
Front pages on display in foyer

Following the earthquake the BNZ vacated their building on Wakefield Street. Later the Westport News bought it, and still operates from there. In 1978 Colin Warren, who had started at the News as a journalist in 1966, with his wife Mary purchased the paper from the Lucas family. He continued as owner, and later "editor-at-large", for nearly 40 years. Warren moved the printing of the paper back to Westport, initially on a sheet-fed printer, then reel-fed, to the current multi-unit press with colour printing. In August 2017 chief reporter Lee Scanlon and her husband Kevin purchased the paper from the Warrens. Scanlon, who prefers the title "chief reporter" to editor, had been at the News for over 40 years.

The News also founded and operated a local Coast-wide radio station (Fifeshire FM Westport) in partnership with Nelson's Fifeshire FM in 1995. The station was forced to cut its ties with Nelson, rebranded as Coast FM in 1999, and was sold to a different local owner in 2012.

== Reporting ==
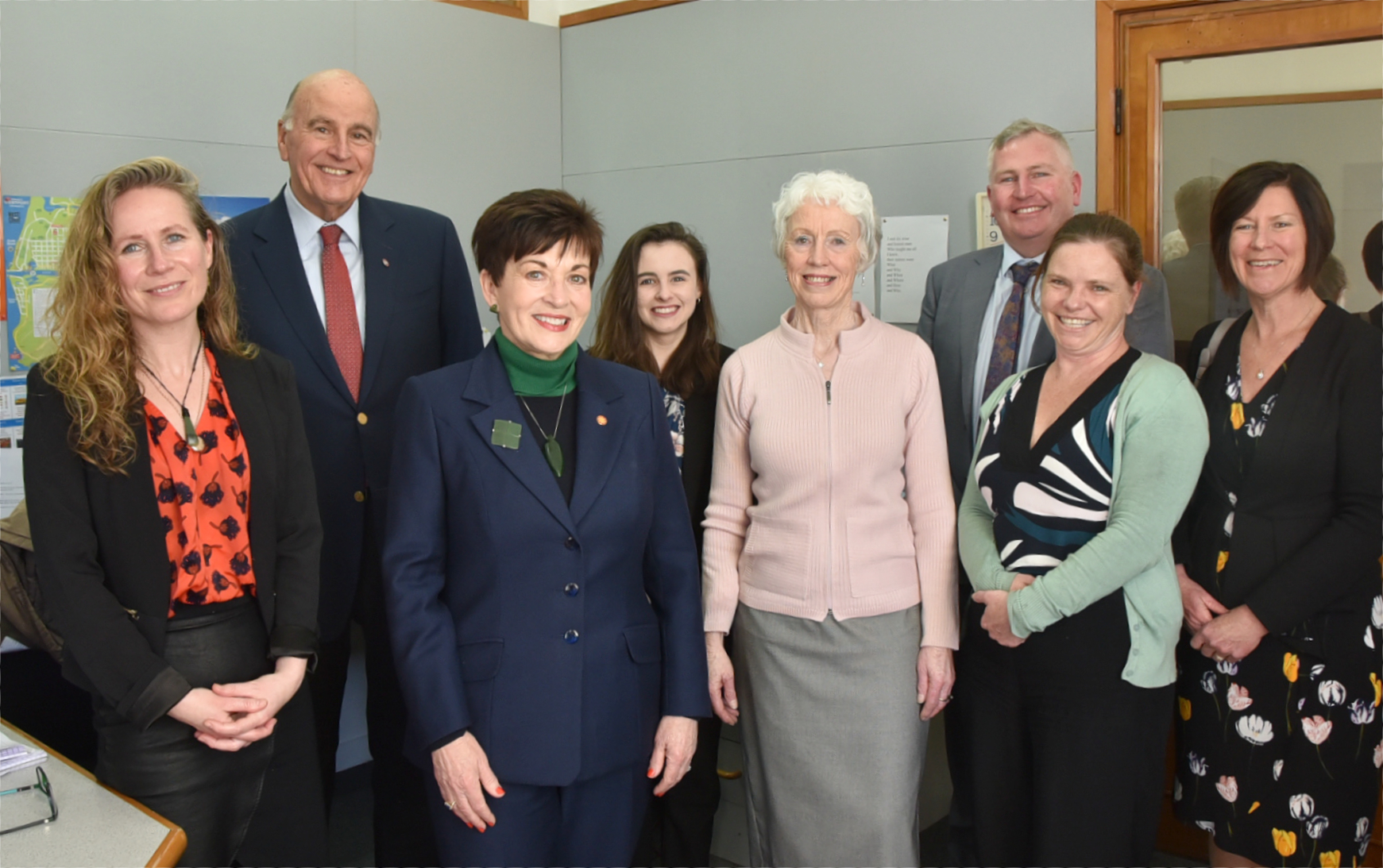
Governor-General Dame Patsy Reddy with Sir David, the News reporting staff, Mayor Jamie Cleine, and Deputy Mayor Sharon Roche on 27 August 2020.

The News has a mixture of local, national, and international news, and a copy-sharing arrangement with RNZ. There is a total staff of 15; aside from Scanlon, there are three other journalists, one of them the writer Becky Manawatu. Ellen Curnow joined as a reporter in November 2019.

The newspaper reported on the opening of the West Coast railway during Premier Richard Seddon's first official visit to the region in May 1883. It also described how Seddon allowed the mining town Seddonville to be named after him. Almost a century later, it reported on the paving of the new Buller Bridge in November 1976. Otago University holds an archive of the newspaper from 1982 to 1991.
