= Charles McLean (rugby union) =

New Zealand rugby union player

Charles McLean MM
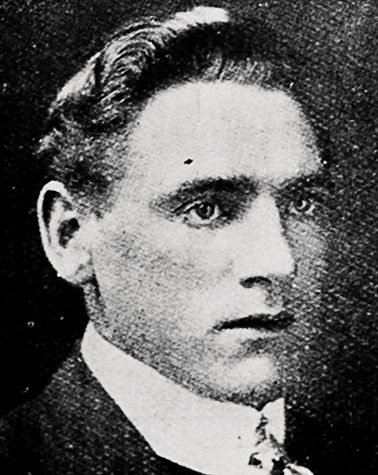
- Born: 20 September 1892; Cape Foulwind, New Zealand
- Died: 7 March 1965 (aged 72); Christchurch, New Zealand
- Height: 1.80 m (5 ft 11 in)
- Weight: 79 kg (175 lb)

Rugby union career
- Position: Loose forward
Provincial / State sides
Years	Team	Apps	(Points)
1919–23	Buller	15	
International career
Years	Team	Apps	(Points)
1920	New Zealand	0	(0)

Charles McLean MM (20 September 1892 – 7 March 1965) was a New Zealand rugby union player. A loose forward, McLean represented Buller at a provincial level, and was a member of the New Zealand national side, the All Blacks, in 1920. He played five matches for the All Blacks, scoring seven tries, but did not appear in any internationals.

McLean enlisted for military service in August 1914, and served with the New Zealand Expeditionary Force throughout World War I, including at Gallipoli. A private, he was awarded the Military Medal in 1918, for acts of gallantry in the field.

McLean died in Christchurch on 7 March 1965, and he was buried at Hokitika Cemetery.
