= Peter Hooper (writer) =

New Zealand writer, conservationist (1919–1991)

Hedley Colwill "Peter" Hooper (19 May 1919 – 3 April 1991) was a New Zealand teacher, writer, bookseller and conservationist. He was born in London, England and emigrated to New Zealand at the age of four, growing up in the Nelson and West Coast districts. Hooper is a first cousin to Elric Hooper, a former director of Christchurch's Court Theatre.

== Professional career ==
Hooper taught at Greymouth High School and Westland High School. For a number of years he owned and ran a bookshop called Walden Books in Greymouth, named after Thoreau's book which was a major influence on his views on nature and simple living.

=== Publications ===
Hooper published a number of poetry books and non-fiction and fiction titles.

His most notable poetry titles are A Map of Morning (1964), Journey Towards an Elegy (1969), Earth Marriage (1972) and Selected Poems (1977). He also published a collection of short stories entitled The Goat Paddock and other stories (1981). New Zealand artist Colin McCahon painted a series of works based on Hooper's poem 'Notes in the Margin' from Journey Towards an Elegy.

Hooper wrote a futuristic trilogy with a conservation message consisting of A Song in the Forest (1979), People of the Long Water (1985) and Time and the Forest (1986).

His two most notable non-fiction titles were a family history entitled The Seas Between (1990) and Shade of the Mugumo Tree: a Kenyan Journey (1990), about a visit he made to Kenya to visit a young man who he had sponsored.

== Environmentalism ==
Hooper was actively involved in the early conservation movement in New Zealand, publishing Our Forests Ourselves in (1981). He was also a member of the Forest and Bird Society and the Maruia Society.

In 1990, Hooper was awarded the New Zealand 1990 Commemoration Medal.

== Legacy ==
Hooper was a great influence on a number of New Zealand writers, including Brian Turner and Jeffrey Paparoa Holman. A former pupil, Pat White, wrote a biography of Hooper, Notes from the Margins: The West Coast's Peter Hooper (2017).
