= Kirsten Warner =

New Zealand writer (born 1956)

- Born: 1956 (age 69–70); Hastings, New Zealand
- Education: MA (creative writing), AUT (2013)
- Occupations: Novelist; poet; journalist
- Partner: Bernie Griffen (died 2023)
- Children: 2
- Writing career
- Notable work: The Sound of Glass Breaking (2018)
- Website: kirstenwarnerauthor.wordpress.com

Kirsten Warner (born 1956) is a New Zealand novelist, poet and journalist. Her debut novel, The Sound of Breaking Glass (2018), won the Hubert Church Best First Book Award for Fiction at the 2019 Ockham New Zealand Book Awards.

== Early life and family ==
Warner was born in Hastings, New Zealand, in 1956. Her father, Gunter Warner, had moved to New Zealand from Germany in May 1939, as a 19-year-old Jewish refugee, and his parents and grandparents were murdered in the Holocaust. He became a schoolteacher in Auckland, and had three children including Warner. Warner intended to write a book from the perspective of the child of a Holocaust survivor for many years; the book ultimately took her ten years to write and another eight years to get published.

== Career ==
For most of her life Warner has worked as a journalist; her articles have been published in The New Zealand Herald, The Listener and other publications. In 1998 she had a short story, "If You Step On A Crack", published in the collection Penguin 25 New Fiction edited by Graham Beattie and Stephanie Johnson. She won the Landfall Essay Competition in 2008.

Her debut novel The Sound of Breaking Glass was published in 2018 by Mākaro Press. The novel is about the experiences of the child of a Holocaust survivor. She had completed the novel, begun years earlier, as part of her Masters of Creative Writing at Auckland University of Technology. It was awarded the Hubert Church Best First Book Award for Fiction at the 2019 Ockham New Zealand Book Awards, with the judges describing it as a "surreal, satirical and deeply moving story of multi-generational trauma". Warner was unable to accept the award in person at the ceremony in May 2019 as she was recovering from a brain aneurysm. The award was accepted on her behalf by her partner and children. By August of that year she was largely recovered and was able to attend the Going West writers' festival.

Tina Shaw for Landfall described the novel as being "about the complex issues around survival"; "How do you cope with 'ordinary' life after having lived through the experience of the Holocaust; and how, as Second Generation, do you cope with the residual guilt and anger of that experience?" Catherine Robertson, reviewing the book for The New Zealand Listener, described it as "an ambitious novel in both content and style", but concluded "it's well worth the extra effort because Warner manages to bring her many plot threads together in an ending that's both moving and satisfying".

In 2018 Warner had a poetry chapbook of six poems, Mitochondrial Eve, published by Compound Press. Paula Green positively reviewed the chapbook, saying "this hallucinogenic, rollercoaster, gut punch of book runs through me like fire".

Warner is also a musician and has performed with swamp blues band Bernie Griffen and The Thin Men. Griffen, her partner of forty-two years, died in 2023.
