= Henry Butland =

New Zealand international rugby union player

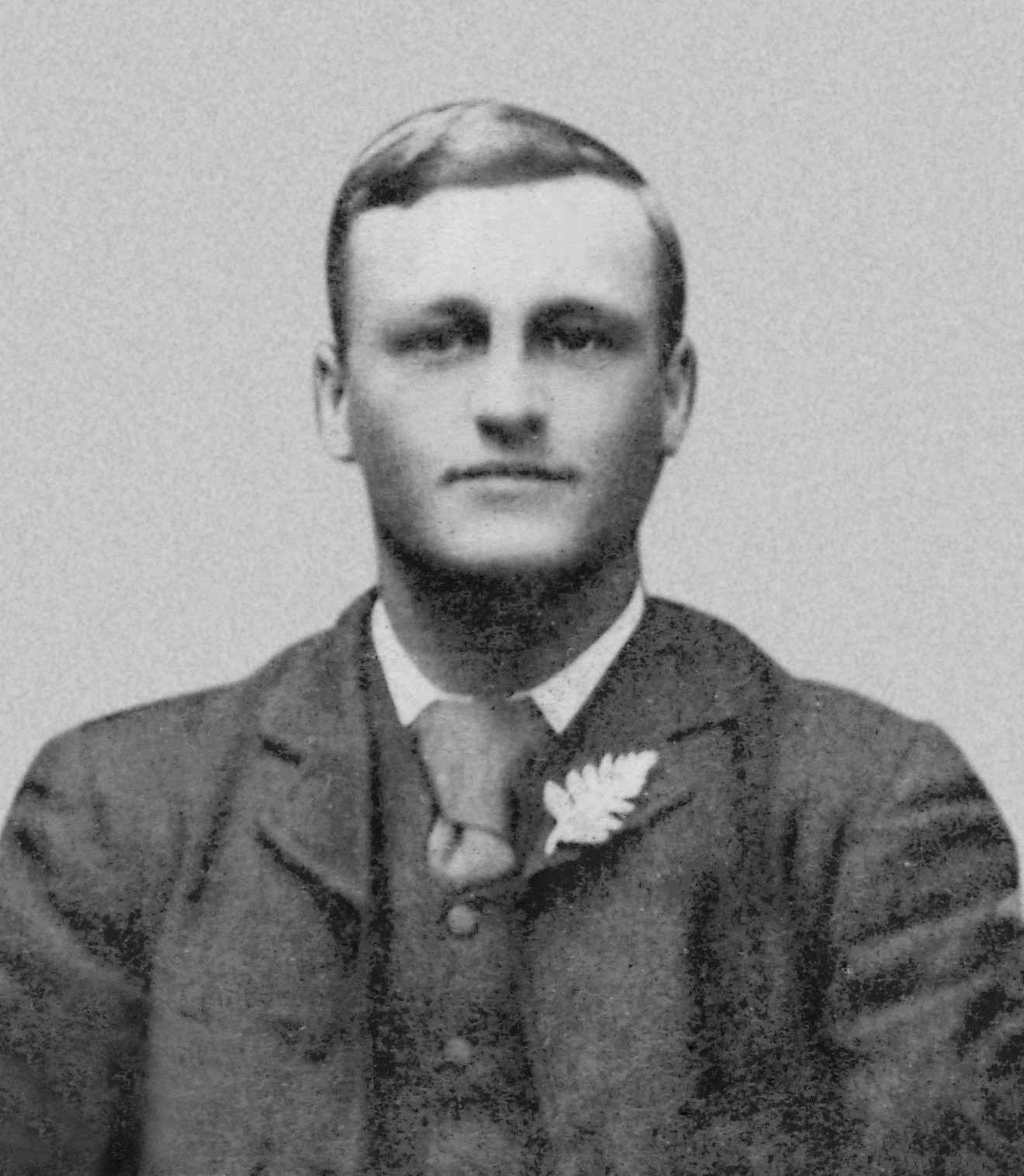
- Butland in 1893
- Born: 11 February 1872 Westport, New Zealand
- Died: 2 December 1956 (aged 84)
- Height: 1.73 m (5 ft 8 in)
- Weight: 79 kg (174 lb; 12 st 6 lb)

Rugby union career
- Position: Halfback
Provincial / State sides
Years	Team	Apps	(Points)
1894–95	West Coast	3	
International career
Years	Team	Apps	(Points)
1893–94	New Zealand	9	(9)

Henry Butland (11 February 1872 – 2 December 1956) was a rugby union player who represented New Zealand in the national side (the All Blacks), playing in the halfback position.

Born in Westport in 1872, he represented West Coast at a provincial level. He was a member of the All Blacks in 1893 and 1894, playing nine matches for the team, but no internationals.

Following the death of Robert Oliphant in January 1956, Butland was the oldest living All Black. He died on 2 December 1956 and was buried at Hokitika Cemetery.

Records
Preceded by Robert Oliphant	Oldest living All Black; 18 January – 2 December 1956	Succeeded by Donald Watson
