= Ingrid Horrocks =

New Zealand writer and academic

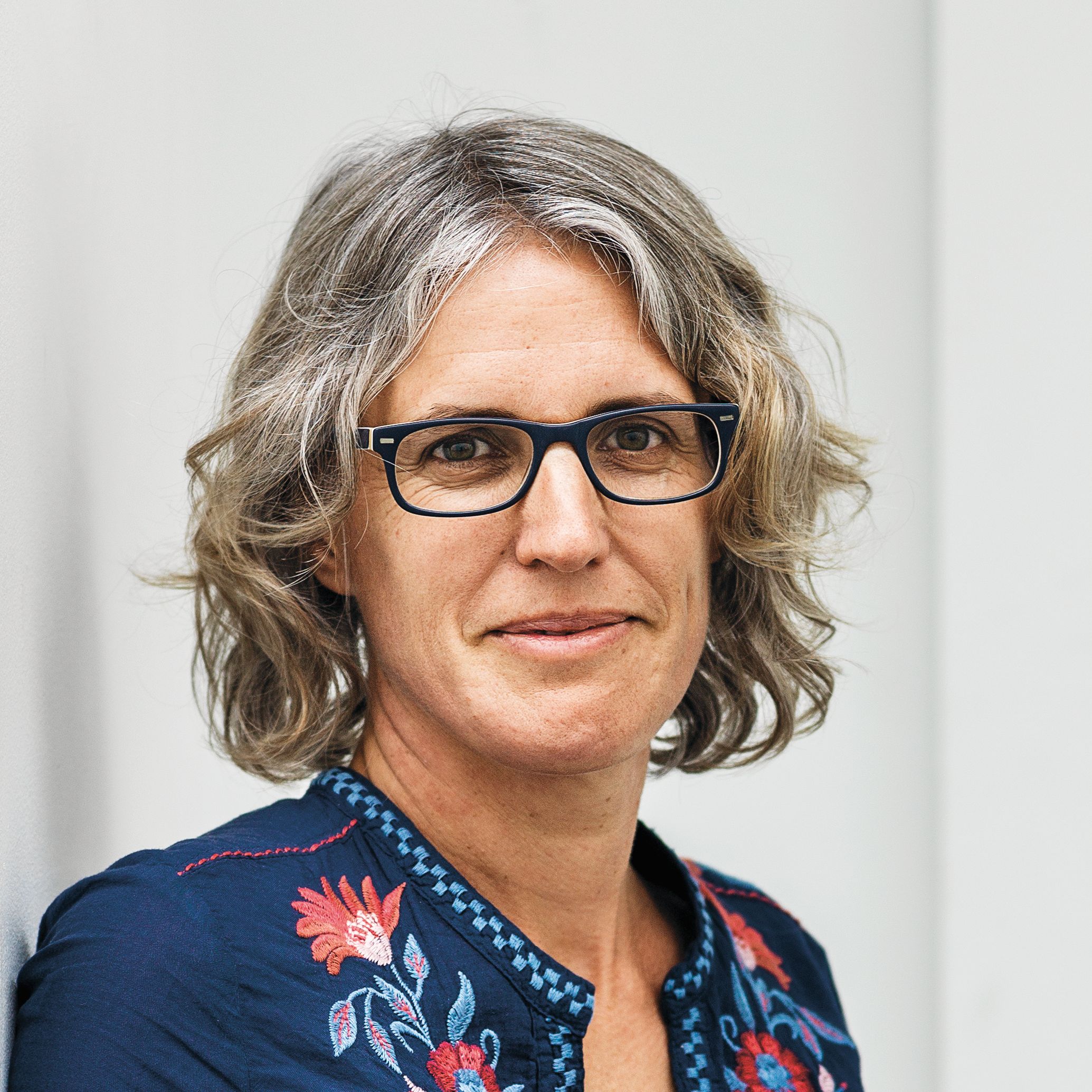
- Born: 1975 (age 50–51); Hamilton
- Occupation: Writer

Ingrid Horrocks is a creative writing teacher, poet, travel writer, editor and essayist. She lives in Wellington, New Zealand.

== Biography ==
Ingrid Horrocks was born in Hamilton in 1975 and grew up on farms north of Auckland and in the Wairarapa.

She obtained a Bachelor of Arts (Honours) from Victoria University of Wellington (1998) and was awarded a Commonwealth Scholarship to study women's travel writing at the University of York, where she graduated with Master of Arts (Distinction) in Eighteenth Century Studies (2001).

She then studied for a doctorate in English literature at Princeton University and received an MA in 2003 and a PhD in 2006.

Her work includes scholarly editions of works by Mary Wollstonecraft and Charlotte Smith, articles in journals and online, conference papers and book chapters, including Chapter One (‘A World of Waters: Imagining, Voyaging, Entanglement’) in A History of New Zealand Literature (Cambridge University Press, 2016). Her poetry and short fiction has appeared in literary magazines such as Landfall, Turbine, J.A.A.M. and Sport, and in anthologies such as Mutes and Earthquakes (Victoria University Press, 1997) and New Zealand Writing: The NeXt Wave (University of Otago Press, 1998). With Lynn Davidson, she co-edited Pukeahu: an exploratory anthology, an online anthology of "waiata, poems, essays, and fiction about Pukeahu / Mt Cook, a small hill in Wellington, Aotearoa-New Zealand that rises between two streams."

Horrocks was associate professor in English and creative writing at Massey University in Wellington, finishing in 2022.

She lives in Wellington with her partner and twin daughters.

== Awards and honours ==
Horrocks won the class prize for creative writing in 1996, the Macmillan Brown Prize in 1996 and a William Georgetti Scholarship in 1999.

She received a Fast-Start Grant from the Marsden Fund in 2008 for her study Reluctant wanderers: women re-imagine the margins, 1775-1800, exploring the figure of the female wanderer in late 18th-century British literary culture.

In 2016, she received the College of Humanities and Social Sciences Teaching Award from Massey University for her innovative creative non-fiction courses.

Her travel essay, ‘Gone Swimming’ was shortlisted for the 2017 Landfall Essay Competition and she was highly commended in the same competition in 2019.

Extraordinary Anywhere: Essays on Place from Aotearoa New Zealand was shortlisted for the Upstart Press Award for Best Non-Illustrated Book in the 2017 PANZ Book Awards.

All Her Lives won the Jann Medlicott Acorn Prize for Fiction at the 2026 Ockham New Zealand Book Awards. The judges said "Emotionally intelligent and historically alert, this book is an outrageously good addition to the top shelf of New Zealand fiction".

== Bibliography ==
=== Non-fiction ===
- Travelling with Augusta: Preston, Gorizia, Venice, Masterton: 1835 and 1999 (Victoria University Press, 2003)
- Where We Swim (Victoria University Press and Queensland University Press, 2021).

=== Fiction ===
- All Her Lives (Te Herenga Waka University Press, 2025)

=== Poetry ===
- Natsukashii (Pemmican Press, 1998)
- Mapping the Distance (Victoria University Press, 2010)

=== As editor ===
- Extraordinary Anywhere: Essays on Place from Aotearoa New Zealand, co-edited with Cherie Lacey (Victoria University Press, 2016)

=== Monographs and scholarly editions ===
- Letters Written during a Short Residence in Sweden, Norway, and Denmark by Mary Wollstonecraft (1796) (Broadview Press, 2013)
- Charlotte Smith: Major Poetic Works, co-edited with Claire Knowles (Broadview Press, 2017)
- Women Wanderers and the Writing of Mobility, 1784-1814 (Cambridge University Press, 2017)
