= Edward Holder =

NZ international rugby union & league player

- Born: Edward Catchpole Holder; 26 July 1908 Seddonville, New Zealand
- Died: 2 July 1974 (aged 65) Christchurch, New Zealand
- Height: 1.83 m (6 ft 0 in)
- Weight: 83 kg (183 lb)
- School: Nelson College
- Occupation(s): Hotel manager Stationer

Rugby union career
- Position: Three-quarter
Provincial / State sides
Years	Team	Apps	(Points)
1929–35	Buller	42	
1942	Buller		
International career
Years	Team	Apps	(Points)
1932–34	New Zealand	1	(0)
- Rugby league career

Playing information
- Position: Three-quarter
Club
Years	Team	Pld	T	G	FG	P
1935–37	Streatham and Mitcham
1937–39	Wigan	80				133
	Total	80	0	0	0	133
Representative
Years	Team	Pld	T	G	FG	P
	Dominion XIII

Edward Catchpole Holder (26 July 1908 – 2 July 1974) was a New Zealand rugby union and rugby league player. A three-quarter, Holder represented the Buller Rugby Union at a provincial level, and was a member of the New Zealand national rugby union side, the All Blacks, in 1932 and 1934. He played 10 matches for the All Blacks including one international. After missing selection for the 1935 All Black tour to Britain, Holder switched to rugby league and played in England, first for Streatham and Mitcham and then for Wigan. He was subsequently reinstated to rugby union during World War II.

Holder was educated at Nelson College from 1922 to 1924.
