= Loftus Armstrong =

New Zealand rugby union player

- Born: Adam Loftus Armstrong; 13 April 1878 Carterton, New Zealand
- Died: 30 January 1959 (aged 80) Hastings, New Zealand
- Weight: 93 kg (205 lb)
- Occupation: Blacksmith

Rugby union career
- Position: Wing-forward
Provincial / State sides
Years	Team	Apps	(Points)
1899–1905	Wairarapa	33	
International career
Years	Team	Apps	(Points)
1903	New Zealand	0	(0)

Adam Loftus Armstrong (13 April 1878 – 30 January 1959) was a New Zealand rugby union player. A wing-forward, Armstrong represented Wairarapa at a provincial level, and was a member of the New Zealand national side, the All Blacks, in 1903. He played five matches for the All Blacks but did not appear in any internationals. After retiring as a player, Armstrong went on to referee to provincial level.

Following the death of Donald Watson in 1958, Armstrong was the oldest living All Black.

Records
Preceded by Donald Watson	Oldest living All Black; 25 December 1958 – 30 January 1959	Succeeded by Billy Wallace
