= Harry Atkinson (rugby union) =

NZ international rugby union player

- Born: Henry James Atkinson; 22 June 1888 Greymouth, New Zealand
- Died: 21 July 1949 (aged 61) Dunedin, New Zealand
- Height: 1.88 m (6 ft 2 in)
- Weight: 95 kg (209 lb)

Rugby union career
- Position: Lock
Provincial / State sides
Years	Team	Apps	(Points)
1911–13	West Coast	7	
1913–14	Otago	11	
International career
Years	Team	Apps	(Points)
1913	New Zealand	1	(0)

Henry James Atkinson (22 June 1888 – 21 July 1949) was a New Zealand rugby union player. A lock, Atkinson represented West Coast and Otago at a provincial level, and was a member of the New Zealand national side, the All Blacks, in 1913. He played 10 matches for the All Blacks including one international.

Atkinson died in Dunedin in 1949 and was buried at the Dunedin Northern Cemetery.
