= Robert Tunnicliff =

- Born: Robert Graham Tunnicliff; 25 June 1894 Nelson, New Zealand
- Died: 7 January 1973 (aged 78) Westport, New Zealand
- Height: 1.75 m (5 ft 9 in)
- Weight: 75 kg (165 lb)
- School: Nelson College
- Occupation(s): School teacher Dairy farmer

Rugby union career
- Position: Hooker
Provincial / State sides
Years	Team	Apps	(Points)
1919	Nelson		
1922–28	Buller		
1925	West Coast–Buller		
1926	Seddon Shield unions		
1928	South Island minor unions		
International career
Years	Team	Apps	(Points)
1923	New Zealand	0	(0)

Robert Graham Tunnicliff (25 June 1894 – 7 January 1973) was a New Zealand rugby union player. A hooker, Tunnicliff represented Nelson and Buller at a provincial level, and was a member of the New Zealand national side, the All Blacks, in 1923. He played one match for the All Blacks: the final game against the touring New South Wales team in 1923. Tunnicliff did not play in any internationals.

Tunnicliff was educated at Nelson College from 1909 to 1911 and served with the New Zealand Rifle Brigade in World War I.
