= Frank Freitas =

- Born: Daniel Frank Errol Freitas; 23 February 1901 Hokitika, New Zealand
- Died: 10 April 1968 (aged 67) Wellington, New Zealand
- Weight: 91 kg (201 lb)
- Occupation(s): Fisherman; Hotelkeeper

Rugby union career
- Position: Loose forward
Provincial / State sides
Years	Team	Apps	(Points)
1924–35	West Coast	49	
International career
Years	Team	Apps	(Points)
1928	New Zealand	0	(0)

Daniel Frank Errol Freitas (23 February 1901 – 10 April 1968) was a New Zealand rugby union player. A loose forward, Freitas represented West Coast at a provincial level, and was a member of the New Zealand national side, the All Blacks, in 1928. He played four games for the All Blacks but no test matches. He died in the Wahine disaster in 1968.
