= Landfall Essay Competition =

Annual essay competition for New Zealand writers

The Landfall Tauraka Essay Prize (formerly the Landfall Essay Competition) is an annual award open to writers from Aotearoa New Zealand. It is judged by the current editor of Landfall Tauraka, the country's longest-running literary journal, and the winning entry is published in a subsequent issue of the journal.

== History ==
The competition was first held in 1997 on the occasion of the 50th anniversary of the literary magazine Landfall. It was established by Chris Price, who was editor at the time, and sponsored by Otago University Press. The competition has been awarded annually since 2009 and is judged each year by the current editor.

The aim of the prize is "to encourage New Zealand writers to think aloud about New Zealand culture" and "to revive and sustain the tradition of vivid, contentious and creative essay writing".

In 2017 the Charles Brasch Young Writers' Essay Competition was launched, named for Landfall founder Charles Brasch, as an annual award open to writers aged 16 to 25.

In October 2025, coinciding with the publication of Landfall’s 250th issue, both competitions were renamed to reflect the journal's new bilingual identity as Landfall Tauraka.

Every two years, selected essays from the two competitions are collected in the Strong Words anthologies, published by Otago University Press. The first volume, Strong Words 2019: The Best of the Landfall Essay Competition, was edited by Emma Neale and chosen by The Spinoff as one of the ten best non-fiction works of the year.

== Eligibility and conditions ==
As of 2025 there are a number of conditions of entry, including:

- The competition is open to New Zealand citizens or permanent residents.
- Essays must not exceed 4000 words (or 2000 words for the Young Writers' prize).
- Essays can be on any topic but must not have been previously published.

The winner is announced and published in each November issue of Landfall Tauraka. The winner receives $3000 and a year's subscription to Landfall Tauraka. The winner of the Young Writers' prize receives $1500 and a year's subscription to Landfall Tauraka.

== List of winners by year ==
- 1997: Gregory O'Brien and Joris de Bres.
- 1999: C. K. Stead and Peter Wells.
- 2002: Patrick Evans and Kapka Kassabova.
- 2004: Martin Edmond and Tze Ming Mok.
- 2006: Anna Sanderson.
- 2008: Alice Miller and Kirsten Warner.
- 2009: Ashleigh Young.
- 2010: Ian Wedde.
- 2011: Philip Armstrong. Runner-up: Siobhan Harvey. Commended: Ruth Nichol, Raewyn Alexander, and Natalie Kershaw.
- 2012: Elizabeth Smither. Runners-up: Majella Cullinane and Jane Williamson.
- 2013: Tim Corballis. Runners-up: Eva Ng and Maggie Rainey-Smith.
- 2014: Diana Bridge. Runners-up: Sarah Bainbridge, Simon Thomas, and Scott Hamilton.
- 2015: Tracey Slaughter. 2nd: Phil Braithwaite. 3rd: Louise Wallace. Highly commended: Therese Lloyd.
- 2016: Airini Beautrais. 2nd: Michalia Arathimos. 3rd: Carolyn Cossey.
- 2017: Joint first: Laurence Fearnley and Alie Benge. Shortlisted: Ingrid Horrocks, Lynley Edmeades, Sue Wootton, Kate Camp, and Mark Houlahan.
- 2018: Alice Miller. 2nd: Susan Wardell. 3rd: Sam Keenan.
- 2019: Joint first: Tobias Buck and Nina Mingya Powles. 3rd: Sarah Harpur. Joint 4th: Joan Fleming and Jillian Sullivan. Highly commended: Ingrid Horrocks, Himali McInnes, and Derek Schulz. Commended: Justine Jungersen-Smith and Amy Brown.
- 2020: A.M. McKinnon. 2nd: Tan Tuck Ming. 3rd equal: Anna Blair and Siobhan Harvey. Highly commended: Sarah Barnett, Shelley Burne-Field, Anna Knox, Una Cruickshank.
- 2021: Andrew Dean. 2nd: Claire Mabey. 3rd: Susan Wardell. Highly commended: Norman Franke, Susanna Elliffe.
- 2022: Tina Makereti
- 2023: Siobhan Harvey.
- 2024: Joint 1st: Franchesca Walker and Hannah August.
- 2025: Tasmin Prichard.

== See also ==
- List of New Zealand literary awards
