= Donald Watson (rugby union) =

New Zealand international rugby union player

- Born: James Donald Watson; 10 August 1872 Rochdale, Greater Manchester, England
- Died: 25 December 1958 (aged 86) New Plymouth, New Zealand
- Occupation: Farmer

Rugby union career
- Position: Forward
Provincial / State sides
Years	Team	Apps	(Points)
1894–99	Taranaki	23	
International career
Years	Team	Apps	(Points)
1896	New Zealand	0	(0)

James Donald Watson (10 August 1872 – 25 December 1958) was a New Zealand rugby union player. A forward, Watson represented Taranaki at a provincial level, and was a member of the New Zealand national side, the All Blacks, in 1896. He played one match for the All Blacks, against Queensland at Wellington.

Following the death of Henry Butland in 1956, Watson was the oldest living All Black.

Records
Preceded by Henry Butland	Oldest living All Black; 2 December 1956 – 25 December 1958	Succeeded by Loftus Armstrong
