= Ronald King =

Ron King
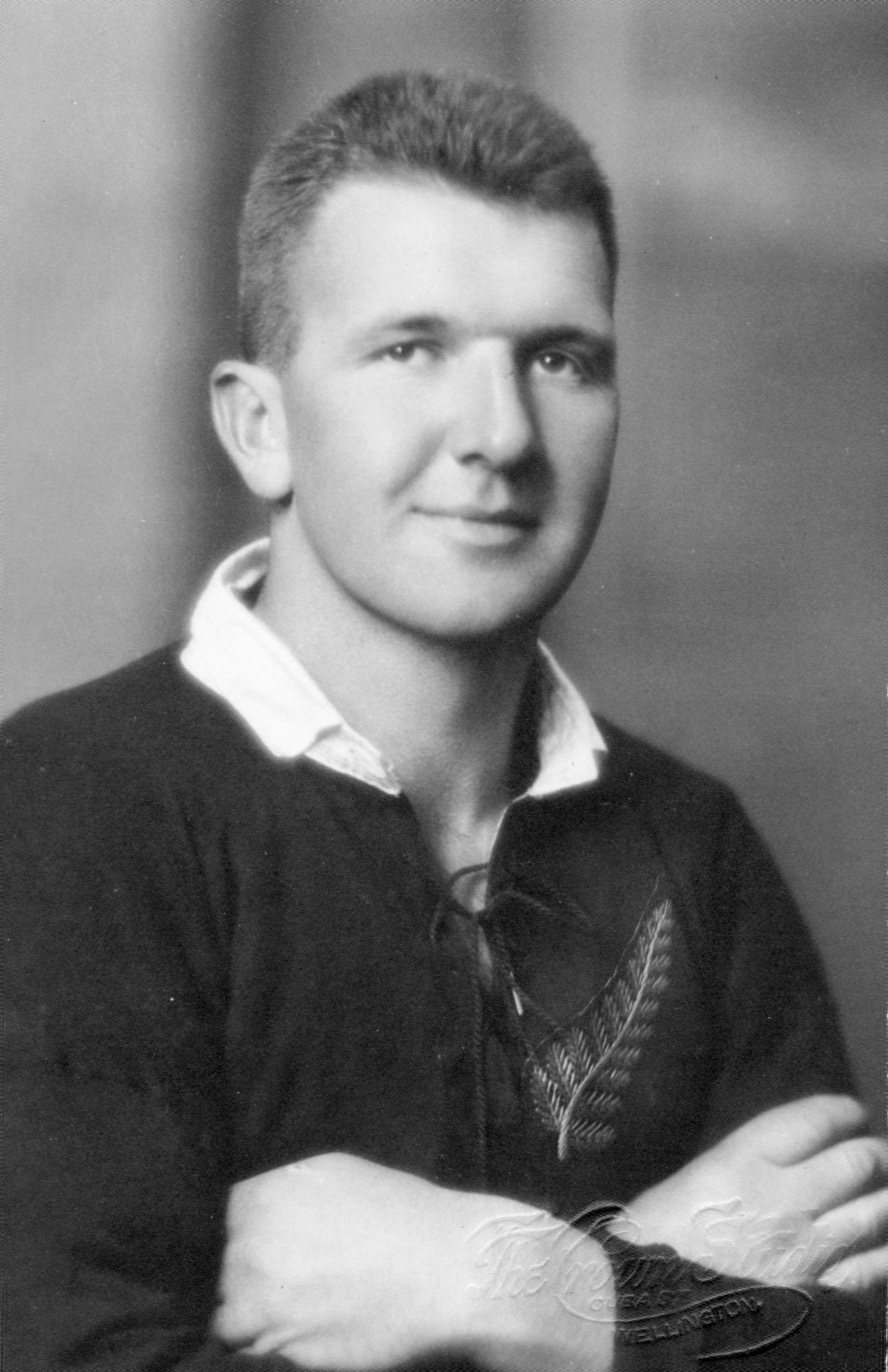
- King in the 1930s
- Born: Ronald Russell King; 19 August 1909 Waiuta, New Zealand
- Died: 10 January 1988 (aged 78) Greymouth, New Zealand
- Height: 1.88 m (6 ft 2 in)
- Weight: 90 kg (200 lb)
- School: Hokitika District High School
- Occupation: Hotelkeeper

Rugby union career
- Position: Lock
Provincial / State sides
Years	Team	Apps	(Points)
1928–1945	West Coast		
International career
Years	Team	Apps	(Points)
1934–1938	New Zealand	13	(0)

Ronald Russell King (19 August 1909 – 10 January 1988) was a New Zealand rugby union player.

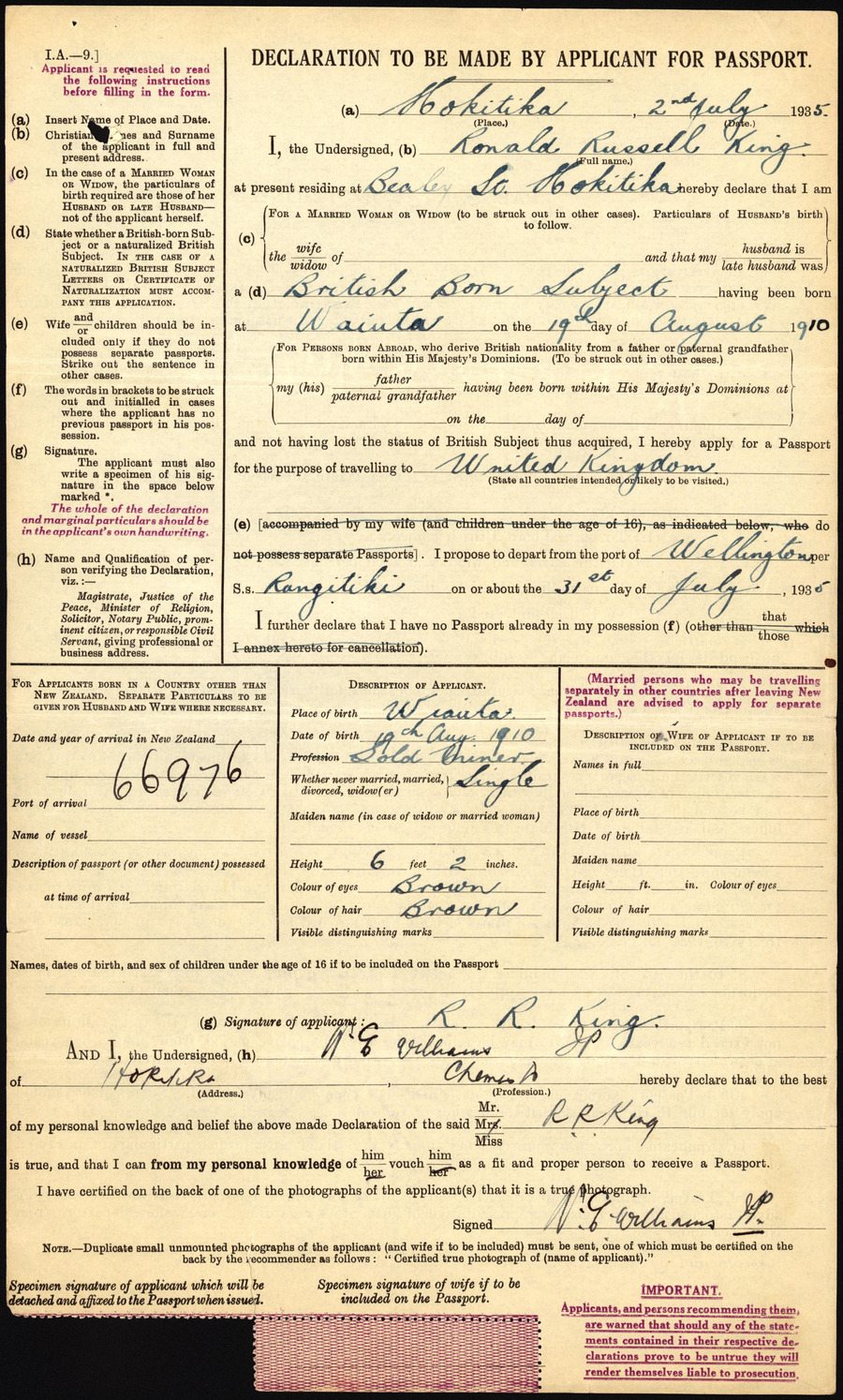
Ronald Russell King passport application (1935)

King was born in 1909, and he received his education at Hokitika District High School. A lock, King represented West Coast at a provincial level, and was a member of the New Zealand national side, the All Blacks, from 1934 to 1938. He played 42 matches for the All Blacks including 13 internationals. He captained the side in the three tests against South Africa in 1937. Between 1957 and 1960 King was a New Zealand selector.
