= Coast FM (Westport) =

Local radio station in New Zealand

Coordinates: 41.75°S 171.6°E

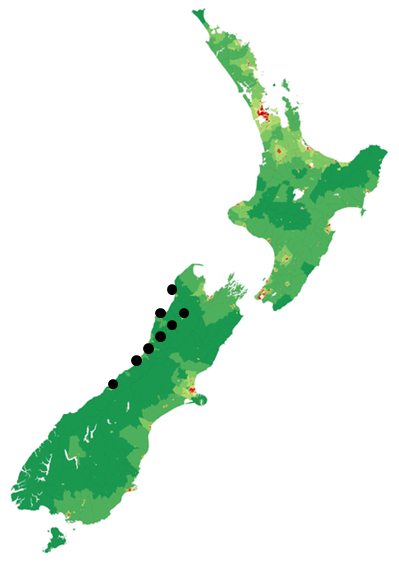
This is a map of Coast FM frequencies.

Coast FM is a locally owned and independent radio station, based in Westport, New Zealand, broadcasting to most of the West Coast Region. The station was born in 1995 as Fifeshire FM Westport, in a partnership between Fifeshire FM in Nelson and the Westport News, and progressively expanded its broadcast reach to Reefton, Greymouth and Hokitika from 1997. A year after the 1998 acquisition of 92 Coast FM, the station was rebranded as "Coast FM", unrelated to NZME's Coast network that broadcasts in other parts of the country. The stations studios and offices were based in the Westport News offices (1995 - 2012) and later in the former BNZ building on Palmerston Street. Today, Coast FM's Westport studio is located at 52 Palmerston Street in Westport.

In early 2026, the station was sold to the owner of Brian FM, who opened another studio in Greymouth, with live programmes now originating from both centres.

== FM Frequencies ==
Coast FM broadcasts across the West Coast on the following frequencies:

- Karamea : 99.3 FM
- Westport : 96.5 FM
- Reefton : 90.3 FM
- Grey District & Westland : 99.5 FM
- Greymouth : 107.5 FM
- Hokitika : 100.3 FM
- Franz Josef : 94.5 FM

== Current on-air lineup ==
- Breakfast with Dave Williamson - 6:00am to 10:00am
- The Workday with Andrew - 10:00am to 2:00pm
- Drive with Dave Nicholas - 2:00pm to 7:00pm

Other shows include the local Saturday Sports Breakfast, Saturday mornings from 7:00am with local sporting identity Barry Townrow, "Lynnes Lounge" on Sunday Nights from 7:00pm with "Nana" Lynne Griffiths and the syndicated "Retro Weekly Top 40".
