= 92 Coast FM =

Radio station in New Zealand

92 Coast FM was a local commercial 1980s and 1990s music radio station, broadcasting in Hokitika on the West Coast of the South Island, New Zealand in 1997.

== Background ==
Coast FM broadcast on 91.9FM & 97.9FM, reaching into parts of Greymouth in the North, Ross in the South and the Hokitika Valley to the East. It was owned and managed by local resident Paul Jamieson as managing director of his 'Coast Communications Ltd' Company.

After Coast FM's first month of operation, an agreement was reached to rebroadcast 92 MORE FM Christchurch after hours and during the 'Si & Phil' Breakfast show (6am - 10am).

== DJs ==
- 10am - 2pm: Aaron Panapa
- 2pm - 5pm: Scott Taylor
- Fill-in or co-host: Paul Jamieson

== Other related stations ==
=== Predecessor ===
Capital Radio 92-100 FM: This was an annual short-term station operated by former local David Kaio and long-term Southland Broadcaster Chris Diack, with appearances by local Paul Jamieson. They broadcast in 1993 (Whitebait Festival) and 1994, 1995 & 1997 (Wildfoods Festival). Transmission was on their 91.9FM Hokitika frequency and later their new 99.9FM Greymouth frequency.

This included outside broadcasts and a number of school-based broadcasts, interviews and local news, including a wide range of music in an attempt to set up a full-time local station. The station initially had a few of other names.

=== Successor ===
Coast FM West Coast (Formally Fifeshire FM Westport): After Paul Jamieson sold his 99.5FM frequency (acquired by government tender in 1993) to Westport News Ltd, the station started broadcasting to Hokitika in 1998.

In 1999–2000, when the station left the after-hours re-broadcast of Fifeshire FM Nelson and went full-time, there was a Coast-wide competition to decide on a new name, where 'Coast FM' was decided.

=== Cross-over station ===
Fifeshire Festival Radio 99.5 FM: In 1999 Chris, David and Paul returned to host a four-day local break-out broadcast to cover the Wildfoods Festival.
