= Buller Rugby Football Union =

Rugby union province in Westport, New Zealand

Buller

Club information
- Full name: Buller Rugby Union
- Colours: Red and blue
- Founded: 1894
- Website: bullerrugby.co.nz

Current details
- Ground: Victoria Square (5,000)
- Competition: Heartland Championship

The Buller Rugby Union (BRU) is a rugby union province based in the town of Westport, New Zealand. The Buller provincial boundary also includes other notable towns such as Reefton, Karamea, Granity, Charleston, Punakaiki and Murchison (Murchison RFC currently compete in the Tasman provincial Union competition).

== History ==
Buller was formed in 1894.

Historically Buller were a strong provincial Union particularly in the pre-1960 amateur era when it would compete on a more level footing with the larger and more famous provincial sides such as Canterbury and Wellington. However, with population increases in the city-based provinces and the formation of the National Provincial Championship (NPC) in 1976 Buller began to struggle as players moved to bigger unions to further their rugby and work careers. Buller played in both the second and third divisions of the former NPC. With the New Zealand Rugby Union (NZRU) restructuring of provincial rugby competitions taking effect in 2006, Buller moved to the Heartland Championship. The Buller side has performed with distinction in this competition, regularly making either the Meads Cup or Lochore Cup semi finals.

Buller (often in combination with West Coast) has had some memorable matches against international sides in the past including a victory over Australia. There have also been a number of other impressive results against international opposition including the British Lions, South Africa, Tonga, Fiji, Samoa, and various New Zealand representative sides including New Zealand Maori and New Zealand Juniors.

== Clubs and schools ==
Buller Rugby Union is made up of 5 clubs:

- Ngakawau Rugby Football Club
- Old Boys Rugby Football Club
- Reefton Rugby Club
- Westport Rugby Football Club
- White Star Rugby Football Club

=== Club Champions ===
==== Senior Shield ====
- 2022 - Westport 23 Reefton 10
- 2023 - White Star 28 Westport 18
- 2024 - White Star 24 Westport 21
- 2025 - Westport 25 White Star 24

==== Jubilee Trophy (Buller & West Coast) ====
- 2025 - Kiwi (WC) 36 Wests (WC) 27

=== Schools ===
Buller also have 3 secondary schools who compete in matches:

- Buller High School
- Karamea Area School
- Reefton Area School

== Provincial representative rugby ==
The Buller team's home ground is Victoria Square in Westport.

Buller has won one provincial championship, the Heartland Championship Lochore Cup in 2012 defeating South Canterbury in the Final.

In 2014, Buller went through round-robin undefeated, progressing to the Meads Cup Final only to fall to Mid Canterbury.

=== Heartland Championship ===
Heartland Championship Results
Year	Pld	W	D	L	PF	PA	PD	BP	Pts	Place	Playoffs		
Year	Pld	W	D	L	PF	PA	PD	BP	Pts	Place	Qual	SF	F
2006	8	3	0	5	139	182	−43	2	14	4th	Lochore Cup	Lost 10–36 to Poverty Bay	—
2007	8	5	0	3	171	186	−15	2	22	5th	No	—	
2008	8	4	1	3	135	164	−29	1	19	5th	No	—	
2009	8	3	0	5	163	156	+7	5	17	4th	Lochore Cup	Lost 22–53 to West Coast	—
2010	8	3	0	5	127	193	−66	1	13	3rd	Lochore Cup	Won 19–14 against Horowhenua-Kapiti	Lost to 9–15 Wairarapa Bush
2011	8	5	0	3	188	131	+57	6	26	4th	Lochore Cup	Lost 30–32 to Poverty Bay	—
2012	8	5	0	3	207	178	+29	5	25	5th	Lochore Cup	Won 42–22 against Poverty Bay	Won 31–28 against South Canterbury
2013	8	4	0	4	147	149	−2	4	20	7th	Lochore Cup	Won 40–30 against Wanganui	Lost 10–17 to South Canterbury
2014	8	8	0	0	282	145	+137	5	37	1st	Meads Cup	Won 22–15 against Horowhenua-Kapiti	Lost 13–36 to Mid Canterbury
2015	8	4	0	4	200	187	+13	5	21	6th	Lochore Cup	Lost 6–20 to King Country	—
2016	8	6	0	2	258	190	+68	6	30	3rd	Meads Cup	Won 16–6 against South Canterbury	Lost 18–20 to Wanganui
2017	8	6	0	2	250	203	+47	4	28	3rd	Meads Cup	Lost 17–18 to Horowhenua-Kapiti	—
2018	8	2	0	6	223	289	-66	8	16	10th	No	—	
2019	8	5	0	3	261	196	+65	6	26	6th	Lochore Cup	Lost 24-56 to South Canterbury	—
2021	8	0	0	8	126	320	-194	2	2	11th	No	—	
2022	8	3	0	5	216	386	-170	5	17	9th	No	—	
2023	8	2	0	6	165	242	-77	7	15	11th	No	—	
2024	8	2	0	6	142	402	−260	2	10	11th	No	—	
2025	8	1	0	7	129	378	−249	2	7	11th	No	—	
2026	8	2	0	6	190	391	−201	6	14	10th	No	—	

There was no Heartland Championship in the 2020 season due to Covid-19 restrictions.

=== Seddon Shield ===
Established in 1906 in honour of Richard John Seddon, the Seddon Shield is a challenge shield contested by representative teams in the upper South Island. Buller along with Nelson Bays, Marlborough and West Coast currently compete for the shield. Originally the Golden Bay-Motueka Rugby Union and the Nelson Rugby Union also competed for the shield before those unions amalgamated to form Nelson Bays. Buller have held the shield on a number of occasions. In 2009 Buller lost their Seddon Shield challenge against Nelson Bays by 29–37.

=== Rundle Cup ===
The Rundle Cup is contested annually between the Buller and West Coast teams. It is one of the oldest trophies in NZ rugby.

The Rundle Cup was donated to the West Coast provincial union during their Annual General Meeting at the Albion Hotel on 24 May 1911 by William Rundle as a trophy for Buller-West Coast matches. Rundle was a local business man in the mining industry and former player for the Grey Football Club. He later perished on the frontline in France during World War One. The first contest for the cup was held in 1911 in Westport and was won by Buller.

=== Ranfurly Shield ===
Buller have never held the Ranfurly Shield despite a number of close matches. The best result being in 1949 when Buller drew 6–6 against Otago at Carisbrook, Dunedin. Had the match been played using the modern scoring system, Buller would have won courtesy of scoring more tries than their Otago opposition.

== Notable players ==
=== All Blacks ===
Buller has had six players selected for the All Blacks while playing their club rugby in Buller:

- Tom Fisher (1914, 5 matches but no tests)
- Edward Holder (1932 & 1934, 10 matches including 1 test)
- Charles McLean (1920, 5 matches but no tests)
- Bill Mumm (1949, 1 test)
- Kenneth Svenson (1922-26, 34 matches including 4 tests)
- Robert Tunnicliff (1923, 1 match but no tests)

Also:

- Clement Green (Westport): played for the South Island team. Also selected for the 1910 tour to Australia but was unable to tour
- Brian Stack (Westport): a wing who played for the South Island and unused reserve for a match against the 1966 British Lions

Other All Blacks to play for Buller at senior or junior level either before or after their national selection were:

- George Aitken (1921 All Black captain and later a Scotland representative, played for Buller in 1914–15)
- Ben Blair (2001 All Black played for Buller at junior level)
- Bobby Black (An Otago All Black on 1914 Australia Tour, played for Buller after he settled in Westport after Australia Tour).
- Sam Bligh (All Black on 1910 Australian Tour, whilst playing his representative rugby for the West Coast. Played for Buller 1907–08, 1911–13)
- John Corbett (1905 All Black whilst playing his representative rugby for the West Coast. Played for Buller from 1908 to 1910)
- Mike Gilbert (1935–36 All Black whilst playing his representative rugby for the West Coast. Played for Buller in 1930)
- Fred Newton (1905 All Black. Played one game for Buller in 1908)

=== New Zealand Māori/Natives representatives ===
- Tom French (well-known Māori rugby administrator)

=== New Zealand Sevens representatives ===
- Steven Yates (2006 Crusaders and 2007–08 New Zealand Sevens representative played for Buller at junior level)

=== Buller centurions ===
The following players have made 100 appearances for Buller:

- Richard Banks (103 games 1973–1989)
- Philip Beveridge (175 games 1993–2017)
- Michael Bonisch (100 games 1982–1994)
- John Brazil (103 games 1986–2000)
- Luke Brownlee (200 games 1999–2018)
- Glenn Elley (115 games 1982–1997)
- John Gilbert (127 games 1971–1986)
- Logan Mundy (123 games 2007–2019)
- Orlando Nahr (123 games 1956–1973)
- Clark "Huck" Nelson (125 games 1996–2009)
- Andrew Stephens (117 games 2007–2019)
- Thomas Stuart (161 games 1984–1999)

== Super Rugby ==
Buller along with Canterbury, Tasman, West Coast, Mid Canterbury and South Canterbury make up the Crusaders Super Rugby franchise.
