= Sam Bligh =

NZ rugby union & league player

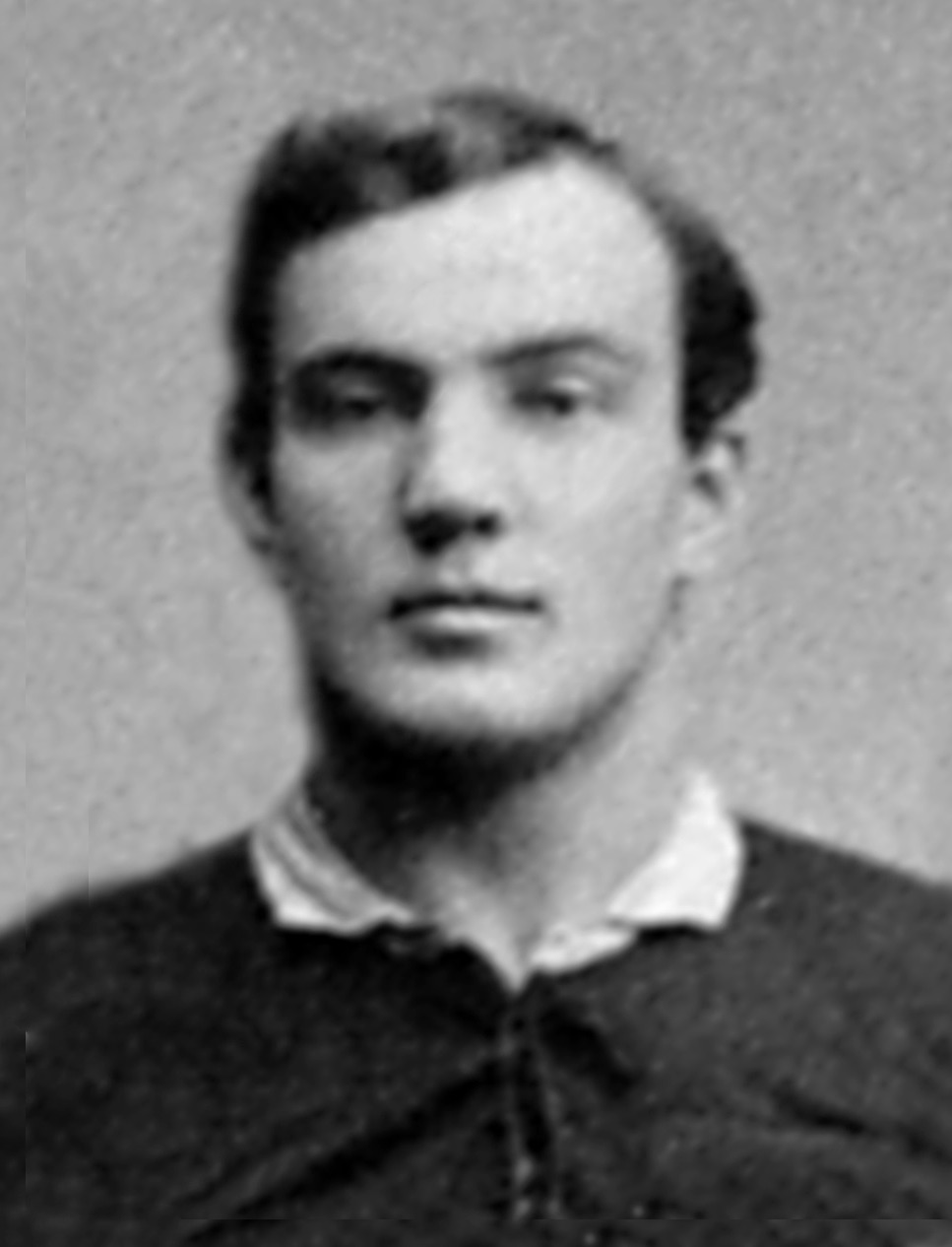
- Bligh in 1910
- Born: Percival Samuel Blight; 8 January 1887 Blacks Point, Reefton, New Zealand
- Died: 25 March 1955 (aged 68) Christchurch, New Zealand
- Occupation(s): Coal miner Quarry foreman

Rugby union career
- Position: Hooker
Provincial / State sides
Years	Team	Apps	(Points)
1907–08, 11–13	Buller		
1909–10	West Coast		
International career
Years	Team	Apps	(Points)
1910	New Zealand	0	(0)
- Rugby league career

Playing information
- Position: Forward
Club
Years	Team	Pld	T	G	FG	P
1915	Blackball

Percival Samuel Blight (8 January 1887 – 25 March 1955), who played under the name Sam Bligh, was a New Zealand rugby union and rugby league player. A rugby union hooker, Bligh represented Buller and West Coast at a provincial level, and was a member of the New Zealand national side, the All Blacks, in 1910 whilst playing his provincial rugby for the West Coast and club rugby for the Blackball Rugby Club.

Bligh played all three fixtures for West Coast in 1909, (including the fixture against Buller) was also selected in 1909 from the West Coast for the South Island representative team alongside fellow West Coast representative Walter Sotheran, that beat the North Island side by 19–11 at Athletic Park in Wellington.

Working in the mine at Blackball, near Greymouth, Bligh was likely instrumental in the formation of the Blackball Club in 1910. He was team captain and nominated by the West Coast Rugby Union for selection for the New Zealand to tour Australia that year. Sam Bligh's selection in the 1910 New Zealand tour was well publicised in Greymouth newspapers yet, for over 100 years, rugby records had credited Bligh as being affiliated to the Buller Rugby Union at time of selection. This error was only discovered in 2013.

He played five matches for the All Blacks but did not play any internationals. He switched to rugby league in 1915 and played for Blackball. He used a pseudonym when playing rugby, because his family held strong temperance beliefs and disapproved of the game.
