= Westland High School, Hokitika =

School in New Zealand

Westland High School
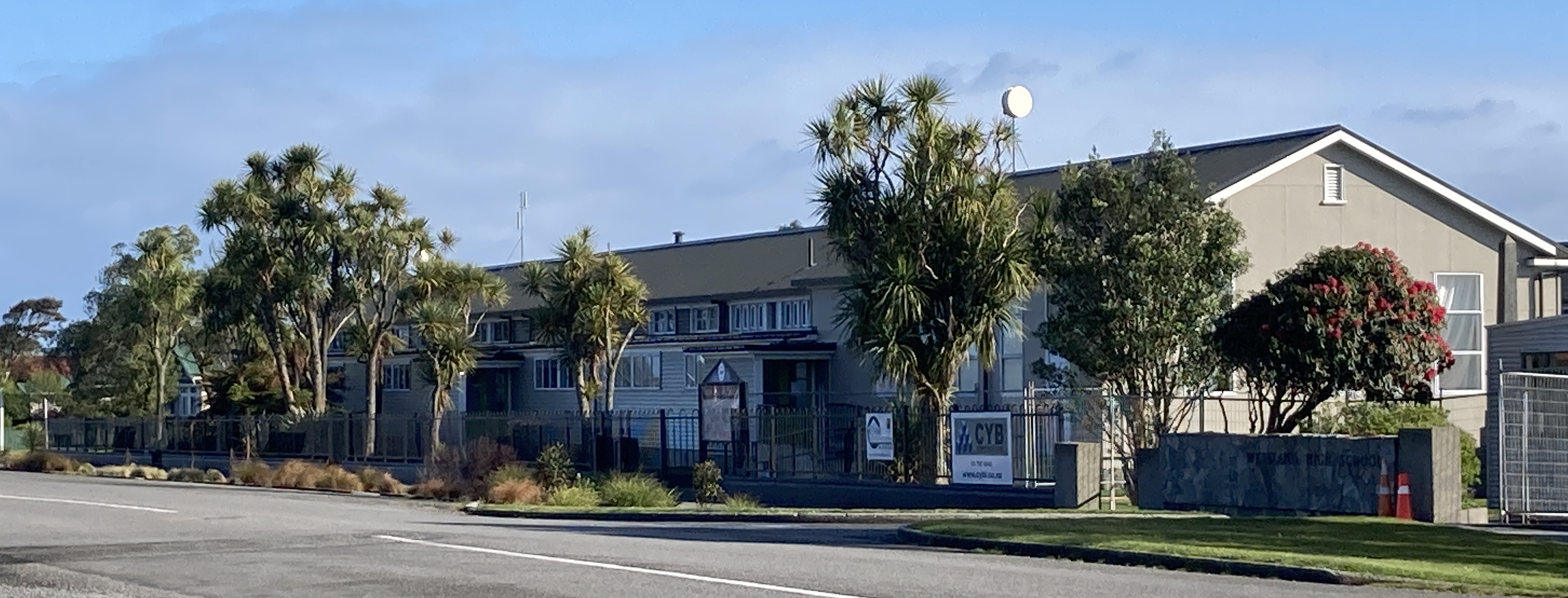
- South view of Westland High School

Location
- 140 Hampden Street; Hokitika, New Zealand; 42.718°S 170.973°E

Information
- Funding type: State
- Established: 1891
- Founder: Gerard George Fitzgerald
- Ministry of Education Institution no.: 305
- Years offered: 7–13
- Enrolment: 404 (July 2026)
- Website: www.westlandhigh.school.nz

Westland High School, previously Hokitika High School or Hokitika District High School, is a secondary school in Hokitika, New Zealand.

== History ==
The first application to have a high school in Hokitika was made in 1879. In the following year, the Royal Commissioners on Universities and Secondary Schools supported this move in their report. The Hokitika High School Act 1883 was a piece of legislation championed by Gerard George Fitzgerald, member of parliament for the Hokitika electorate. The legislation, passed in September 1883, allowed for the establishment of a high school in Hokitika, formulated how the school board was to be determined, and gave the mechanism of dealing with land endowment. The school board, which first met in February 1884, came together at regular interval but found that it would have insufficient funds to pay for a headmaster. The impasse was broken by The Hokitika High School Act 1883 Amendment Act, 1890, which was sponsored by the local MP Joseph Grimmond. This enabled the high school to be established through a merger with the Hokitika State School, and Hokitika High School opened on Monday, 19 January 1891.

The school's name was changed in 1963 to Westland High School; this was accommodated through the Westland High School Amendment Act 1963.

The school war memorial is an obelisk that lists those pupils and teachers who served in World War I, and those who were killed in the Second Boer War and in World War II.

== Enrolment ==
At the August 2019 Education Review Office (ERO) review of the school, Westland High School had 300 students enrolled. 51% of students were male and 49% were female. The prioritised ethnic composition was 68% New Zealand European, 28% Māori, 2% Pacific peoples, and 2% other ethnic groups.

== Notable alumni ==
- Ronald King (1909–1988), New Zealand rugby union player
- Stephen Lowe (born 1962), third Catholic Bishop of Hamilton, New Zealand
- Holly Robinson (born 1994), para-athlete
- Bill Schramm (1886–1962), Labour MP for the Auckland East electorate

== Notable staff ==
- Peter Hooper (1919–1991) was a New Zealand teacher, writer, bookseller and conservationist
