= Mary McCallum =

New Zealand author and journalist

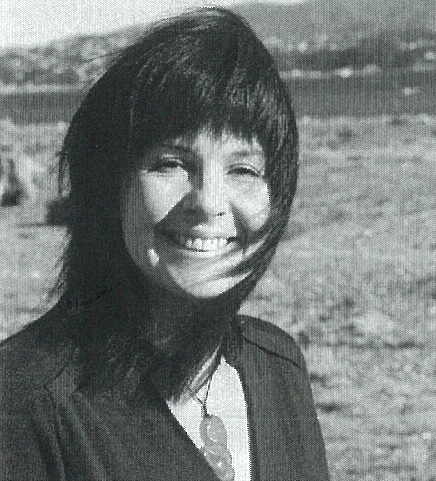
- McCallum in 2008
- Born: 1961 (age 64–65); Lusaka, Zambia
- Education: Wellington Girls' College, Victoria University of Wellington
- Writing career
- Language: English
- Genres: Fiction, poetry, children’s
- Notable awards: New Zealand Society of Authors Hubert Church Best First Book Award for Fiction (2008), Readers' Choice Award (2008)
- Website: O Audacious Book

Mary McCallum (born 1961) is a publisher, author and journalist from New Zealand.

== Background ==
McCallum was born in 1961 in Lusaka, Zambia. Aged four, she moved to New Zealand and was educated in Wellington and the United Kingdom, including at Wellington Girls' College. In 1981, she received a Bachelor of Arts degree in English literature and political science from Victoria University of Wellington (including studying under Bill Manhire). In 2005 she received a Master of Arts degree in creative writing from the International Institute in Modern Letters, Victoria University of Wellington.

== Career ==
In 2013 McCallum co-founded Mākaro Press with her son Paul Stewart in Wellington, New Zealand. Their first book was Eastbourne: An Anthology, which McCallum also co-edited with Maggie Rainey-Smith and Anne Manchester. Over the next five years Mākaro Press published books in a range of genres with a focus on fiction and poetry, using a hybrid publishing model whereby the authors publishing under the Submarine imprint contributed to the cost of the book. In 2018, McCallum co-founded a second press – The Cuba Press – with Sarah Bolland, and focused Mākaro Press on a limited number of titles a year eventually reducing it to a single literary novel. The Mākaro novel for 2019 was Auē by Becky Manawatu, which went on to win New Zealand's top fiction prize: the Jann Medlicott Acorn Prize, as well as the MitoQ Award for Best First Novel and the Ngaio Marsh Award for Best Crime Novel. It was number one on the bestsellers list for much of the following year, and continues to sell well. Two of Mākaro's other novels have won the best first book of fiction award and two others have been longlisted. One of the press's poetry books has also been longlisted for the poetry award.

McCallum's first novel, The Blue, was published in 2007 by Penguin New Zealand. It won the Hubert Church Memorial Prize for Best First Book of Fiction at the Montana New Zealand Book Awards and the Readers' Choice Award. In 2014 she published a novel for children: Dappled Annie and the Tigrish (Gecko Press), with illustrations Annie Hayward. It received a Kirkus gold star in the US. In 2018, Mary published her first collection of poems, XYZ of Happiness, under her own Submarine imprint. It was selected by the New Zealand Listener as one of the top ten poetry books of the year, and one of the poems was selected for Best NZ Poems.

In 2006 McCallum's essay on Eastbourne was published a collection of essays entitled Eastbourne, 100 Years with Alison Carew.

McCallum has published in a number of literary journals including short stories in Turbine (2008) and poetry in Landfall (#133, 1980).

McCallum has been a feature writer for New Zealand Listener, Dominion Post, The Press, New Novel Review. Since 2002 she has reviewed books for Radio New Zealand and in 2007 for the Good Morning show on TVNZ. She has also worked as a tutor, including teaching creative writing at Massey University since 2008.

== Awards ==
McCallum won the PEN Young Writer of the Year Award in 1979 and her writing was praised in the Denis Glover Awards. She was awarded the 2003/2004 Lilian Ida Smith Award.

Her novel The Blue won the New Zealand Society of Authors Hubert Church Best First Book Award for Fiction and the Readers' Choice Award at the 2008 Montana New Zealand Book Awards.

Creative New Zealand awarded her the Louis Johnson New Writer's Bursary to develop her novel second novel, Precarious.

In 2008 McCallum was shortlisted for the Glenn Schaeffer Prize in Modern Letters.
