= Robert Oliphant (rugby union) =

- Born: 1 December 1864 Omagh, County Tyrone, Ireland
- Died: 18 January 1956 (aged 91) O'Neill's Point Cemetery, Auckland, New Zealand
- Height: 1.78 m (5 ft 10 in)
- Weight: 73 kg (161 lb)
- Occupation: Builder

Rugby union career
- Position: Wing-forward
Provincial / State sides
Years	Team	Apps	(Points)
1887–91	Manawatu		
1892–93	Wellington		
1894–96	Auckland		
1900–02	Hawke's Bay		
International career
Years	Team	Apps	(Points)
1893, 1896	New Zealand	0	(0)

Robert Oliphant (1 December 1864 – 18 January 1956) was a New Zealand rugby union player. A wing-forward, Oliphant represented Manawatu, Wellington, Auckland and Hawke's Bay at a provincial level, and was a member of the New Zealand national side, the All Blacks, in 1893 and 1896. He played three games for the All Blacks but did not appear in any test matches.

In 1897, Oliphant was awarded the silver medal of the Royal Humane Society of Australasia for saving a girl, Margaret Purnell, from drowning in Auckland Harbour on 29 May 1896.

Following the death of Sir Henry Braddon in 1955, Oliphant held the distinction of being the oldest living All Black. He died on 18 January 1956 in Auckland and was buried at O'Neill's Point Cemetery in Bayswater.

In January 1915, Oliphant volunteered for the New Zealand Expeditionary Force and gave his date of birth as 22 January 1872, but it is likely that he falsified this so that he would be considered young enough for service. He served in Samoa throughout the war, reaching the rank of armourer sergeant.

Records
Preceded by Henry Braddon	Oldest living All Black; 8 September 1955 – 18 January 1956	Succeeded by Henry Butland
