= Mākaro Press =

New Zealand publisher

- Founded: 2013
- Founders: Mary McCallum and Paul Stewart
- Country of origin: New Zealand
- Headquarters location: Wellington
- Publication types: New Zealand fiction
- Imprints: Submarine (author-funded books)
- Official website: makaropress.co.nz

Mākaro Press is a New Zealand publisher based in Wellington. It was founded in 2013 and has published several award-winning books including Auē by Becky Manawatu.

== History ==
Mākaro was founded in 2013 by novelist and editor Mary McCallum and her son Paul Stewart. McCallum had been editing an anthology of writers from Eastbourne and decided to publish it herself, with her son joining to assist with the project.

Over the first five years of its operation, Mākaro published over seventy books in a variety of genres including both fiction and non-fiction. In 2014 it published the best-selling The Book of Hat by Harriet Rowland, a young woman suffering from terminal cancer, which received a Storylines Notable Book Award and was a finalist in the non-fiction category at the 2015 New Zealand Book Awards for Children and Young Adults. Rowland died shortly after the book was released.

In 2018, McCallum and Stewart decided to focus on publishing New Zealand debut fiction, because of the challenges faced by first-time novelists in New Zealand. Together with Sarah Bolland, they set up a separate publisher called the Cuba Press to focus on other works, and Mākaro pivoted to publishing one fiction book per year.

Since its change in direction, Mākaro has published three books that won top awards at the Ockham New Zealand Book Awards: Auē by Becky Manawatu (winner of the Jann Medlicott Acorn Prize for Fiction and the award for best first book in 2020), Victory Park by Rachel Kerr (winner of the award for best first book in 2021), and The Sound of Breaking Glass by Kirsten Warner (winner of the award for best first book in 2019). Auē also won the 2020 Ngaio Marsh Award for Best Crime Novel. Auē had been rejected by several publishers before being accepted by Mākaro, and the editing process took a year, with six revisions.

== Publishing awards ==
In 2020, Paul Stewart received the Young NZ Publisher of the Year for his work with Mākaro and the Cuba Press.

Mākaro Press won the Nielsen Book Publisher of the Year at the Aotearoa Book Industry Awards in 2021. The judging panel described the publisher as having "made outstanding contributions to NZ literature".
