= Buller High School =

School in Westport, New Zealand

Coordinates: 41.7474°S 171.6051°E

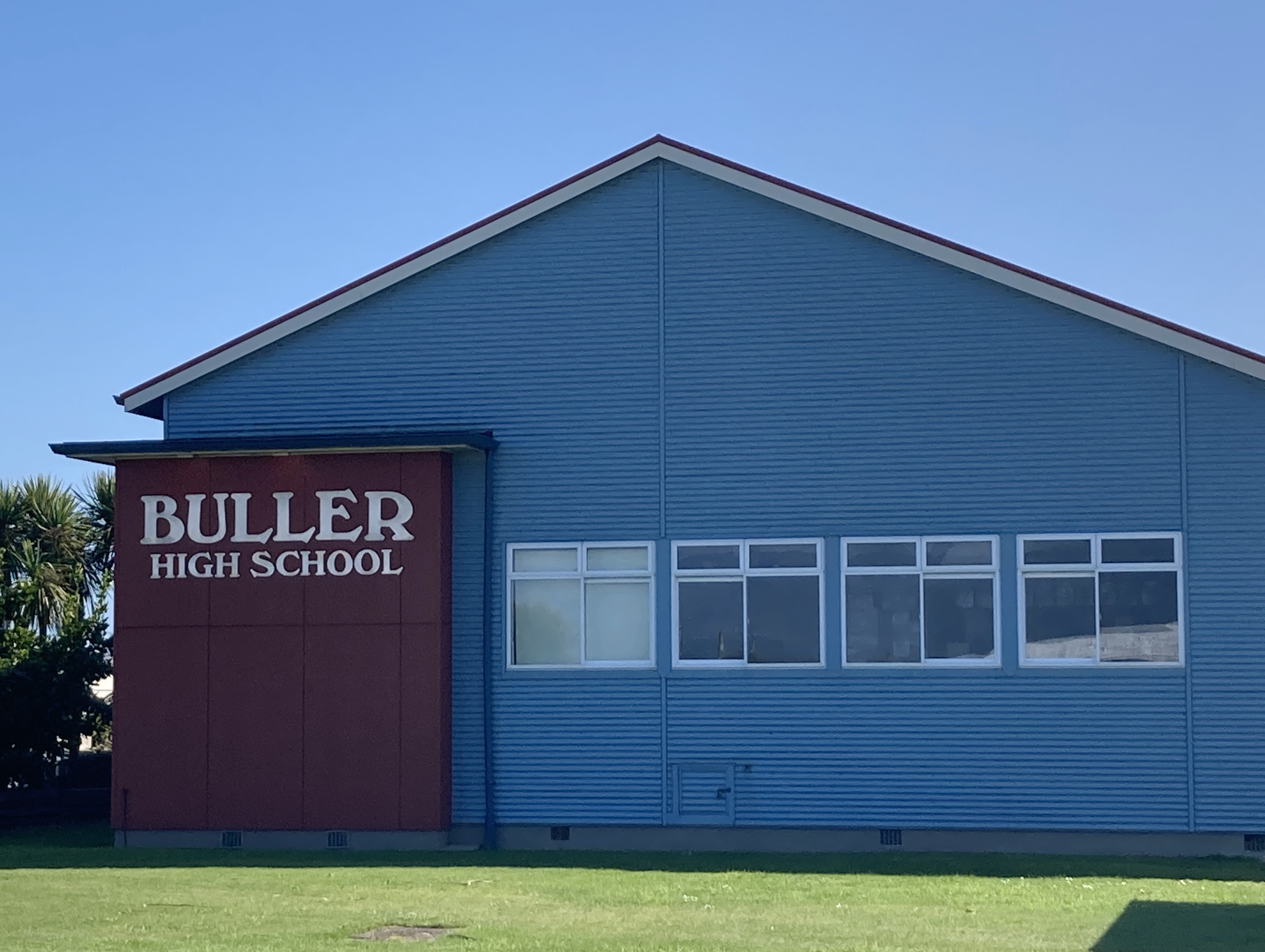

Location
- Derby Street, Westport

Information
- Type: Secondary (Year 9–13)
- Motto: Tibi seris, tibi metis (As you sow, so you shall reap)
- Established: 1922; 104 years ago
- Ministry of Education Institution no.: 301
- Chairperson: Glenn Irving
- Principal: Vai Mahutariki
- Enrolment: 358 (July 2026)
- Socio-economic decile: 3
- Website: buller.ac.nz

Buller High School is a secondary school in the town of Westport, New Zealand. The school has a roll of over 340 students, all Year 9 to Year 13. As well as students from Westport, the school has a large number of students from nearby towns that do not have high schools of their own, such as Waimangaroa, Granity, and Seddonville. The school was founded in 1922, although has ties to earlier secondary schooling in the Buller District.
