= West Coast Rugby Football Union =

- Full name: West Coast Rugby Football Union
- Founded: 1890; 136 years ago
- Ground(s): John Sturgeon Park, Greymouth (Capacity: 6,000)
- Chairman: John Canning
- CEO: Josh Costello
- Coach: T.B.A
- League: Heartland Championship
Team kit

Official website
- [ westcoastrugby.co.nz/]]

The West Coast Rugby Football Union, formed in 1890, is the official governing body for rugby union in the Westland County, Hokitika Borough and Greymouth Borough districts, located in the West Coast provincial region of New Zealand, and is affiliated to the New Zealand Rugby Football Union. The West Coast RFU provincial representative team, a founding member of the National Provincial Championship, is based in Greymouth. It plays home matches at John Sturgeon Park (known as Rugby Park until 2018).

In 2015, West Coast celebrated its 125th Jubilee.

== Clubs ==
West Coast Rugby Football Union is made up of six clubs:

- Blaketown RFC
- Grey Valley RC
- Kiwi RFC
- Greymouth Marist RFC
- South Westland RFC
- Wests RFC

=== Club champions ===
The Jubilee Trophy is played for by West Coast and Buller clubs.

==== Jubilee Trophy ====
- 2026 Kiwi 53-13 Wests
- 2025 Kiwi 36-27 Wests

==== Taylorville Wallsend Trophy ====
- 2025 - Wests 26-24 Kiwi
- 2024 - Wests 20-12 Kiwi
- 2023 - Kiwi 35-30 Wests
- 2022 - Kiwi 47-27 Wests

== Provincial representative rugby ==
=== National Provincial Championship (NPC) ===
From 1976 to 2005 the West Coast provincial team played in the second and third divisions of the National Provincial Championship. West Coast did not win a Provincial Championship title in any division.

NPC Division 3 results
Year	Pld	W	D	L	PF	PA	PD	BP	Pts	Place	Playoffs		
Year	Pld	W	D	L	PF	PA	PD	BP	Pts	Place	Qual	Semifinal	Final
2005	7	0	0	7	79	237	−158	2	2	8th	No	—	
2004	7	2	0	5	130	267	−137	2	10	7th	No	—	

=== Heartland Championship ===
From 2006 onwards West Coast has played in the Heartland Championship. In 2008 the team reached the Meads Cup semi-finals but lost to Wanganui.

West Coast won the Lochore Cup in the 2023 season, and were runners up in 2024.

Heartland Championship results
Year	Pld	W	D	L	PF	PA	PD	BP	Pts	Place	Playoffs		
Year	Pld	W	D	L	PF	PA	PD	BP	Pts	Place	Qual	Semifinal	Final
2006	8	1	0	7	55	121	−66	2	6	6th (Pool A), 6th in Lochore Cup pool	No	—	
2007	8	4	0	4	155	192	−37	1	12	4th (Pool A), 3rd in Lochore Cup pool	Lochore Cup	Lost 23–31 to South Canterbury	—
2008	8	3	0	5	122	146	−24	5	21	2nd (Pool A), 4th in Meads Cup pool	Meads Cup	Lost 18–40 to Wanganui	—
2009	8	5	0	3	166	159	+7	1	21	4th (Pool A), 1st in Lochore Cup pool	Lochore Cup	Won 53–22 against Buller	Lost 13–21 to North Otago
2010	6	2	0	4	112	180	−68	1	9	6th (Pool A), 4th in Lochore Cup pool	No	—	
2011	8	2	1	5	144	216	−72	3	13	9th	No	—	
2012	8	2	0	6	140	185	−45	4	12	9th	No	—	
2013	8	6	0	2	190	173	+17	4	28	4th	Meads Cup	Lost 25–28 to Mid Canterbury	—
2014	8	2	0	6	163	232	−69	5	13	10th	No	—	
2015	8	3	0	5	184	208	−24	4	16	10th	No	—	
2016	8	2	0	6	188	400	−212	3	11	10th	No	—	
2017	8	5	0	3	209	201	+8	6	26	6th	Lochore Cup	Won 24-14 against North Otago	Lost 15-47 to Mid Canterbury
2018	8	4	0	4	228	241	+8	6	16	9th	No	—	
2019	8	6	0	2	217	232	+8	3	27	5th	Lochore Cup	Won 41-35 against Poverty Bay	Lost 19-23 to South Canterbury
2021	8	3	0	5	181	219	-38	4	16	9th	No	—	
2022	8	0	0	8	185	301	-116	7	7	12th	No	—	
2023	8	4	0	4	218	212	+6	5	25	7th	Lochore Cup	Won 33-27 against Wairarapa Bush	Won 23-20 against Poverty Bay
2024	8	3	0	5	228	265	-37	8	20	8th	Lochore Cup	Won 52-51 against Horowhenua-Kapiti	Lost 44-46 to King Country
2025	8	4	0	4	268	203	+65	8(-15)	9	10th	No	—	
2026	8	0	0	8	209	483	-274	6	6	12th	No	—	

There was no competition in 2020 due to Covid-19 restrictions.

In September 2025 West Coast were sanctioned with a financial penalty of $5,000 and 15 competition points for a breach of Heartland Championship player eligibility rules.

=== Ranfurly Shield ===
West Coast have never held the Ranfurly Shield. Their Ranfurly Shield challenges include:

- 27-8-1932 - Canterbury 5 West Coast 3 (L.T.Martyn try)
- 2-9-1933 - Canterbury 23 West Coast 14 (R B Scandrett & Ronald King tries, L.T.Martyn one penalty, one conversion)
- 7-9-1935 - Canterbury 16 West Coast 11 (E.Pfahlert, Ronald King tries, L.T.Martyn two penalties, one conversion)
- 26-9-1936 - Otago 30 West Coast 0
- 20-9-1952 - Waikato 20 West Coast 6 (A.J.Lindbom two penalties)
- 11-9-1954 - Canterbury 8 West Coast 0
- 24-9-1955 - Canterbury 20 West Coast 11 (F.W.Gugich & R.N.Inkster tries, A.A.McNabb one penalty, one conversion)
- 25-8-1962 - Auckland 52 West Coast 6 (T.N.McAra drop goal, J.M.Earthorne one penalty)
- 16-9-1972 - Canterbury 47 West Coast 3 (R.Nelson one penalty)
- 27-7-1974 - Marlborough 18 West Coast 0
- 29-7-1978 - Manawatu 51 West Coast 10 (C.R.Skates try, A.F.Kissick two penalties)
- 25-8-1984 - Canterbury 68 West Coast 3 (G.Cook drop goal)
- 4-7-2000 - Waikato 99 West Coast 3 (M.Foster one penalty)

=== Rundle Cup ===
The Rundle Cup is contested by the West Coast and Buller Rugby Football Union when they meet in senior fixtures.

The Rundle Cup was donated to the West Coast provincial union during their Annual General Meeting at the Albion Hotel on 24 May 1911 by William Rundle as a trophy for West Coast v Buller matches. Rundle was a local business man in the mining industry and former player for the Grey Football Club. He later perished on the frontline in France during World War One. The first contest for the Rundle Cup was held in 1911 in Westport, and it replaced the Molloy Cup as the region’s symbol of rugby supremacy.

The first game between the two Unions occurred in 1896 and bragging rights on the Coast now come via the Rundle Cup.

Of the 37 challenge trophies contested by two provinces in New Zealand rugby it is of the longest continuous existence, it is also the second oldest provincial trophy after the Ranfurly Shield.

== All Blacks ==
There have been eight players selected for the All Blacks whilst playing their club rugby in the West Coast.

- Harry Atkinson
- Sam Bligh
- Henry Butland
- John Corbett
- Frank Freitas
- Mike Gilbert
- Ronald King
- Jack Steel

== Super Rugby ==
West Coast is a member of the Crusaders Super Rugby franchise along with the Canterbury, Tasman, Buller, Mid Canterbury and South Canterbury provincial football unions.
