= Lochore Cup =

New Zealand rugby union trophy

The Lochore Cup is a New Zealand rugby union trophy named after famed Wairarapa Bush and All Blacks player and coach Brian Lochore. It is contested during the Heartland Championship. It was first awarded in 2006, when the Heartland Championship format was introduced.

== Competition ==
=== Regular season ===
At present, all 12 teams play 8 games over 8 weeks before the finals. Once finished, the teams placed 5–8 advance to the Lochore Cup finals. The top 4 teams play for the Meads Cup. Previously, a pool system was used between 2006 and 2010 to determine who played for the Cups. In 2021, due to a delay in the start of the competition caused by COVID-19, the semifinal round for both Cups was scrapped, and the Lochore Cup was instead contested between the teams that finished third and fourth respectively in the regular season.

=== Finals ===
The Lochore Cup winner is determined in four-team single-elimination tournament. The semifinal matchups are seeded 1–4 and 2–3, with the higher seed receiving home field advantage. The highest remaining seed hosts the Lochore Cup final.

== Winners ==
Year	Winner	Score	Runner-up
2006	Poverty Bay	46–34	King Country
2007	Poverty Bay	38–35	South Canterbury
2008	Poverty Bay	26–5	Horowhenua-Kapiti
2009	North Otago	21–13	West Coast
2010	Wairarapa Bush	15–9	Buller
2011	Poverty Bay	49–22	South Canterbury
2012	Buller	31–28	South Canterbury
2013	South Canterbury	17–10	Buller
2014	Wanganui	14–12	North Otago
2015	King Country	47–34	North Otago
2016	North Otago	44–22	King Country
2017	Mid Canterbury	47–15	West Coast
2018	Horowhenua-Kapiti	26–23	Wairarapa Bush
2019	South Canterbury	23–19	West Coast
2021	Wanganui	22–16	North Otago
2022	East Coast	25–20	Mid Canterbury
2023	West Coast	23–20	Poverty Bay
2024	King Country	46–44	West Coast
2025	North Otago	64-47	Horowhenua-Kapiti
2026	Whanganui	43-42	South Canterbury

In 2020 no competition was held due to COVID-19.

== See also ==
- Hanan Shield competed for by Mid Canterbury, North Otago and South Canterbury
- Heartland Championship
- Meads Cup
- National Provincial Championship (1976–2005)
- National Provincial Championship (2006–present)
- New Zealand Heartland XV
- Rundle Cup played between Buller and West Coast
