= 2017 Heartland Championship =

- Date: 26 August 2017–28 October 2017
- Countries: New Zealand

Final positions
- Champions: Wanganui (Meads Cup); Mid Canterbury (Lochore Cup)
- Runner-up: Horowhenua-Kapiti (Meads Cup); West Coast (Lochore Cup)

Tournament statistics
- Matches played: 54

The 2017 Heartland Championship, was the twelfth edition of the Heartland Championship, a rugby union competition involving the twelve amateur rugby unions in New Zealand. The tournament included a round-robin stage in which the twelve teams played eight games each and then the top four advanced to the Meads Cup semifinals, while fifth to eighth advanced to the Lochore Cup semifinals.

In both of these knockout stages the top seeds (first and fifth) played at home against the lowest seeds (fourth and eighth), the second highest seeds (second and sixth) played at home against the third highest seeds (third and seventh) and the final had the higher seed play at home against the lower seed.

Wanganui won the Meads Cup for the third time in a row and the sixth time overall.

It was the first win in the Lochore Cup for Mid Canterbury. They had previously won the Meads Cup in 2013 and 2014. As a result, Mid Canterbury joined North Otago, Wairarapa Bush and Wanganui as the provinces to have won both the Meads Cup and Lochore Cup.

During the Heartland Championship, former All Blacks Piri Weepu, Alby Mathewson and Regan King played for Wairarapa Bush, King Country and Mid Canterbury respectively.

== Teams ==
Locations of teams in the 2016 Heartland Championship

The 2017 Heartland Championship was contested by the following teams:

Team	Super Rugby partner	Hometown
Buller	Crusaders	Westport
East Coast	Hurricanes	Ruatoria
Horowhenua-Kapiti	Hurricanes	Levin
King Country	Chiefs	Taupō
Mid Canterbury	Crusaders	Ashburton
North Otago	Highlanders	Oamaru
Poverty Bay	Hurricanes	Gisborne
South Canterbury	Crusaders	Timaru
Thames Valley	Chiefs	Paeroa
Wairarapa Bush	Hurricanes	Masterton
Wanganui	Hurricanes	Wanganui
West Coast	Crusaders	Greymouth

== Standings ==
Following the round-eight-week regular season South Canterbury was the top qualifier with 36 points from winning seven games, after losing their first game to Buller.

Pos.	Team	Pld	W	D	L	PF	PA	PD	TB	LB	Pts
1	South Canterbury	8	7	0	1	273	190	+83	7	1	36
2	Horowhenua-Kapiti	8	7	0	1	227	107	+120	3	1	32
3	Buller	8	6	0	2	250	203	+47	3	1	28
4	Wanganui	8	5	0	3	279	125	+154	3	3	26
5	Mid Canterbury	8	5	0	3	275	224	+51	2	1	26
6	West Coast	8	5	0	3	209	201	+8	5	1	26
7	North Otago	8	4	0	4	235	178	+57	5	4	25
8	Poverty Bay	8	4	0	4	185	229	−44	4	0	20
9	Thames Valley	8	3	0	5	209	174	+35	4	4	20
10	King Country	8	1	0	7	206	323	−117	5	3	12
11	Wairarapa Bush	8	1	0	7	174	313	−139	4	2	10
12	East Coast	8	0	0	8	98	353	−255	0	0	0

Meads Cup qualification
Lochore Cup qualification

In the case of a two-team tie on points the ranking of teams is decided by:
- (1) the winner of the round robin match between the two provinces; then
- (2) highest point difference; then
- (3) most tries scored; then
- (4) a coin toss.

In the case of a three-team or more tie on points the ranking of teams is decided by:

- (1) the province with the most wins against other tied provinces in the Round Robin; then
- (2) if two teams remain tied they shall be ranked according to the criteria listed above, but if more than two teams remain tied, they shall be ranked according to criteria (2) to (4) only.

== Finals ==
=== Meads Cup ===
Although they qualified 4th, Wanganui won their Meads Cup semi-final away to South Canterbury and followed up with a win over Horowhenua-Kapiti at Levin.

Meads Cup semi-finals
2	Horowhenua-Kapiti	18
3	Buller	17
4	Wanganui	29
1	South Canterbury	24

Meads Cup final
2	Horowhenua-Kapiti	14
4	Wanganui	30

=== Lochore Cup ===
Mid Canterbury who finished the regular season fifth and therefore top qualifier for the Lochore Cup accounted for Poverty Bay in their semi-final and West Coast in the final by comfortable points margins.

Lochore Cup semi-finals
1	Mid Canterbury	56
4	Poverty Bay	22
2	West Coast	24
3	North Otago	14

Lochore Cup final
1	Mid Canterbury	47
2	West Coast	15

== See also ==
- Hanan Shield competed for by Mid Canterbury, North Otago and South Canterbury
- Rundle Cup played between Buller and West Coast
- New Zealand Heartland XV
- Ranfurly Shield 2010–2019
- 2017 Mitre 10 Cup
