= 2007 Heartland Championship =

Amateur rugby union competition in New Zealand

- Date: 18 August 2007–18 October 2007
- Countries: New Zealand

Final positions
- Champions: North Otago (Meads Cup); Poverty Bay (Lochore Cup)
- Runner-up: Wanganui (Meads Cup); South Canterbury (Lochore Cup)

The 2007 Heartland Championship was the second season of the Heartland Championship, the primary provincial rugby union championship in New Zealand played between 18 August and 18 October 2007. As in the inaugural competition, the 2006 Heartland Championship, 12 teams were involved.

North Otago won the Meads Cup, beating Whanganui in the final, while Poverty Bay repeated as Lochore Cup champions, overcoming a half-time deficit of 16 points to beat South Canterbury.

== Round 1 ==
=== Standings ===
The top three places in each pool, highlighted in green, advanced to the Meads Cup. The remaining teams entered the Lochore Cup.

==== Pool A ====
Pos	Name	Pld	W	D	L	F	A	+/−	BP	Pts
1	Mid Canterbury	5	3	0	2	122	92	+30	3	15
2	Wairarapa Bush	5	3	0	2	140	67	+73	3	15
3	King Country	5	3	0	2	88	66	+22	2	14
4	West Coast	5	3	0	2	91	114	−23	1	13
5	Thames Valley	5	2	0	3	89	118	−29	2	10
6	Horowhenua-Kapiti	5	1	0	4	91	164	−73	0	4

==== Pool B ====
Pos	Name	Pld	W	D	L	F	A	+/−	BP	Pts
1	North Otago	5	5	0	0	185	59	+126	3	23
2	Buller	5	4	0	1	112	104	+8	1	17
3	Wanganui	5	3	0	2	111	86	+25	3	15
4	Poverty Bay	5	2	0	3	101	99	+2	2	10
5	South Canterbury	5	1	0	4	49	105	−56	1	5
6	East Coast	5	0	0	5	41	146	−105	1	1

=== Results ===
==== Week 1 ====
Pool	Date	Time	Home team	Score	Away team	Score
A	August 18	14:30	Mid Canterbury	7	Thames Valley	13
A	August 18	14:30	Horowhenua-Kapiti	13	King Country	34
A	August 18	14:30	Wairarapa Bush	46	West Coast	0
B	August 18	14:30	North Otago	51	Buller	20
B	August 18	14:30	South Canterbury	7	Poverty Bay	24
B	August 18	14:30	Wanganui	28	East Coast	0

==== Week 2 ====
Pool	Date	Time	Home team	Score	Away team	Score
A	August 25	14:30	Thames Valley	5	Wairarapa Bush	41
A	August 25	14:30	King Country	22	Mid Canterbury	14
A	August 25	14:30	Horowhenua-Kapiti	17	West Coast	31
B	August 25	14:30	Wanganui	15	Buller	19
B	August 25	14:30	South Canterbury	9	East Coast	5
B	August 25	14:30	Poverty Bay	11	North Otago	31

==== Week 3 ====
Pool	Date	Time	Home team	Score	Away team	Score
A	September 1	14:30	West Coast	34	Thames Valley	17
A	September 1	14:30	Mid Canterbury	42	Horowhenua-Kapiti	20
A	September 1	14:30	Wairarapa Bush	16	King Country	8
B	September 1	14:30	East Coast	7	Buller	38
B	September 1	14:30	North Otago	26	South Canterbury	7
B	September 1	14:30	Wanganui	22	Poverty Bay	20

==== Week 4 ====
Pool	Date	Time	Home team	Score	Away team	Score
A	September 8	14:30	Horowhenua-Kapiti	18	Wairarapa Bush	12
A	September 8	14:30	King Country	13	Thames Valley	9
A	September 8	14:30	Mid Canterbury	23	West Coast	12
B	September 8	14:30	South Canterbury	8	Wanganui	30
B	September 8	14:30	North Otago	38	East Coast	5
B	September 8	14:30	Poverty Bay	13	Buller	15

==== Week 5 ====
Pool	Date	Time	Home team	Score	Away team	Score
A	September 15	14:30	Thames Valley	45	Horowhenua-Kapiti	23
A	September 15	14:30	Wairarapa Bush	25	Mid Canterbury	36
A	September 15	14:30	West Coast	14	King Country	11
B	September 15	14:30	East Coast	24	Poverty Bay	33
B	September 15	14:30	Buller	20	South Canterbury	18
B	September 15	14:30	Wanganui	16	North Otago	39

== Round 2 ==
=== Standings ===
==== Meads Cup Pool ====
Pos	Name	Pld	W	D	L	F	A	+/−	BP	Pts
1	North Otago	8	6	0	2	266	104	+162	5	29
2	Mid Canterbury	8	6	0	2	213	151	+62	4	28
3	Wanganui	8	5	0	3	206	135	+71	6	26
4	Wairarapa Bush	8	5	0	3	196	131	+65	3	23
5	Buller	8	5	0	3	171	186	−15	2	22
6	King Country	8	3	0	5	117	178	−61	2	14

==== Lochore Cup Pool ====
Pos	Name	Pld	W	D	L	F	A	+/−	BP	Pts
1	Poverty Bay	8	5	0	3	193	162	+31	4	24
2	South Canterbury	8	4	0	4	139	173	−34	3	19
3	West Coast	8	4	0	4	155	192	−37	1	17
4	Thames Valley	8	2	0	6	147	215	−68	4	12
5	East Coast	8	2	0	6	130	210	−70	3	11
6	Horowhenua-Kapiti	8	1	0	7	164	260	−96	2	6

=== Results ===
==== Week 6 ====
Pool	Date	Time	Home team	Score	Away team	Score
M	September 22	14:00	Buller	17	Wairarapa Bush	24
M	September 22	14:30	Mid Canterbury	21	Wanganui	19
M	September 22	14:30	North Otago	52	King Country	5
L	September 22	14:30	West Coast	29	East Coast	15
L	September 22	14:30	Poverty Bay	30	Horowhenua-Kapiti	19
L	September 22	14:30	Thames Valley	22	South Canterbury	28

==== Week 7 ====
Pool	Date	Time	Home team	Score	Away team	Score
M	September 29	14:30	Mid Canterbury	45	Buller	18
M	September 29	14:30	King Country	11	Wanganui|	36
M	September 29	14:30	Wairarapa Bush	15	North Otago	7
L	September 29	14:30	East Coast	31	Horowhenua-Kapiti	22
L	September 29	14:30	Poverty Bay	26	Thames Valley	23
L	September 29	14:30	South Canterbury	27	West Coast	14

==== Week 8 ====
Pool	Date	Time	Home team	Score	Away team	Score
M	October 6	14:30	Buller	24	King Country	13
M	October 6	14:30	North Otago	22	Mid Canterbury	25
M	October 6	14:30	Wanganui	40	Wairarapa Bush	17
L	October 6	14:30	Horowhenua-Kapiti	32	South Canterbury	35
L	October 6	14:30	Thames Valley	13	East Coast	43
L	October 6	14:30	West Coast	21	Poverty Bay	36

== Semifinals ==
=== Meads Cup ===
Date	Time	Home team	Score	Away team	Score
October 13	16:05	North Otago	30	Wairarapa Bush	13
October 13	13:35	Mid Canterbury	0	Wanganui	18

=== Lochore Cup ===
Date	Time	Home team	Score	Away team	Score
October 13	14:30	Poverty Bay	65	Thames Valley	3
October 13	14:30	South Canterbury	31	West Coast	23

== Finals ==
=== Meads Cup ===
Date	Time	Home team	Score	Away team	Score
October 20	16:05	North Otago	25	Wanganui	8

=== Lochore Cup ===
Date	Time	Home team	Score	Away team	Score
October 20	13:35	Poverty Bay	38	South Canterbury	35

== See also ==
- Hanan Shield competed for by Mid Canterbury, North Otago and South Canterbury
- Rundle Cup played between Buller and West Coast
- New Zealand Heartland XV
- Ranfurly Shield 2000–2009
- 2007 Air New Zealand Cup
