= 2022 Heartland Championship =

- Date: 20 August 2022–22 October 2022
- Countries: New Zealand

Final positions
- Champions: South Canterbury (Meads Cup); East Coast (Lochore Cup)
- Runner-up: Whanganui (Meads Cup); Mid Canterbury (Lochore Cup)

Tournament statistics
- Matches played: 54

The 2022 Heartland Championship, was the 16th edition of the Heartland Championship, a rugby union competition involving the twelve amateur provincial unions in New Zealand.

The tournament began with a round-robin stage in which the twelve teams played eight games each, from which the top four advanced to the Meads Cup semifinals, while fifth to eighth advanced to the Lochore Cup semifinals. In both of these knockout stages the top seeds (first and fifth) played at home against the lowest seeds (fourth and eighth), the second highest seeds (second and sixth) played at home against the third highest seeds (third and seventh) and the final featured the higher seed playing at home against the lower seed.

== Teams ==
Locations of teams in the 2016 Heartland Championship

The 2022 Heartland Championship was contested by the following teams:

Team	Coach	Super Rugby partner	Home ground(s)
Buller	Nathan Thompson	Crusaders	Westport
East Coast	Hosea Gear	Hurricanes	Ruatoria
Horowhenua-Kapiti	Chris Wilton	Hurricanes	Levin
King Country	Craig Jeffries	Chiefs	Taupō
Mid Canterbury	John Sherratt	Crusaders	Ashburton
North Otago	Jason Forrest	Highlanders	Oamaru
Poverty Bay	Miah Nikora	Hurricanes	Gisborne
South Canterbury	Nigel Walsh	Crusaders	Timaru
Thames Valley	David Harrison & Joe Murray	Chiefs	Paeroa
Wairarapa Bush	Mark Rutene	Hurricanes	Masterton
Whanganui	Jason Hamlin	Hurricanes	Wanganui
West Coast	Dave Perin	Crusaders	Greymouth

== Regular season standings ==
In the regular season, South Canterbury topped the standings with 39 points after winning all eight games.

Pos.	Team	Pld	W	D	L	PF	PA	PD	TB	LB	Pts
1	South Canterbury	8	8	0	0	368	122	+246	7	0	39
2	Whanganui	8	7	0	1	352	142	+210	7	1	36
3	Thames Valley	8	5	0	3	247	189	+58	5	2	27
4	King Country	8	5	0	3	218	201	+17	3	2	25
5	North Otago	8	4	0	4	315	201	+114	5	2	23
6	Horowhenua-Kapiti	8	4	0	4	218	298	−80	3	1	20
7	East Coast	8	4	0	4	155	242	−87	2	0	18
8	Mid Canterbury	8	3	0	5	214	249	−35	4	2	18
9	Buller	8	3	0	5	216	386	−170	5	0	17
10	Poverty Bay	8	3	0	5	183	242	−59	3	1	16
11	Wairarapa Bush	8	2	0	6	199	297	−98	3	2	13
12	West Coast	8	0	0	8	185	301	−116	4	3	7

Meads Cup qualification
Lochore Cup qualification

== Finals ==
In the Meads Cup the top placegetter plays at their home ground against the fourth team while the second placed team plays at home against the third. In the Lochore Cup the fifth placegetter plays at their home ground against the eighth team while the sixth placed team plays at home against the seventh. The winning semi-finalists then meet in the respective finals for each Cup, played at the home-ground of the team ranked highest in the regular season.

=== Meads Cup ===
In the 2022 season South Canterbury set a record for the most points (491), tries (69) and conversions (46). They were a class above the opposition winning their semi-final 76–9 over King Country and the final by 47–36 over Whanganui.

The 47 points scored by South Canterbury in the final was also a record as was Sam Briggs individual total of 22.

Meads Cup semi-finals
2	Whanganui	25
3	Thames Valley	18
1	South Canterbury	76
4	King Country	9

Meads Cup final
2	South Canterbury	47
4	Whanganui	36

=== Lochore Cup ===
North Otago finished the regular season 5th and therefore top qualifier for the Lochore Cup. However, they lost at home 15–31 to Mid Canterbury in their semi-final. Ngati Porou East Coast upset Horowhenua-Kapiti 37–30 at Levin.

Ngati Porou East Coast then beat Mid Canterbury by 25–20 in the final. It was the first Lochore Cup title for Ngati Porou East Coast. They become the 6th team to have won both the Meads Cup and the Lochore Cup.

Lochore Cup semi-finals
1	North Otago	15
4	Mid Canterbury	31
2	Horowhenua-Kapiti	30
3	Ngati Porou East Coast	37

Lochore Cup final
1	Ngati Porou East Coast	25
2	Mid Canterbury	20

== Bill Osborne Taonga ==
Poverty Bay was awarded the Bill Osborne Taonga through being the 5th ranked team in the 2021 regular season, earning the right to defend it in the 2022 season. They successfully defended the Taonga against Wairarapa Bush but then lost it to Ngati Porou East Coast who defended it twice.

- August 27 - Poverty Bay 30 Wairarapa Bush 26
- September 10 - Poverty Bay 10 Ngati Porou East Coast 12
- September 17 - Ngati Porou East Coast 29 West Coast 27
- October 1 - Ngati Porou East Coast 20 Wairarapa Bush 16

== Ian Kirkpatrick Medal ==
Since 2022, the Heartland Championship Player of the Year award has been awarded a medal named after former All Blacks captain Ian Kirkpatrick. The winner of the Medal for 2022 was Sam Parkes (Ngati Porou East Coast). Other finalists were Siu Kakala (South Canterbury) and Semi Vodosese (Whanganui).

== See also ==
- Hanan Shield competed for by Mid Canterbury, North Otago and South Canterbury
- Rundle Cup played between Buller and West Coast
- New Zealand Heartland XV
- Ranfurly Shield 2020–2029
- 2022 Bunnings NPC
