= 2015 Heartland Championship =

- Date: 22 August 2015–25 October 2015
- Countries: New Zealand

Final positions
- Champions: Wanganui (Meads Cup); King Country (Lochore Cup)
- Runner-up: South Canterbury (Meads Cup); North Otago (Lochore Cup)

The 2015 Heartland Championship, the tenth edition of the Heartland Championship since the 2006 reconstruction of the National Provincial Championship, was a rugby union competition involving the twelve semi-professional rugby unions in New Zealand. The tournament involved a round-robin stage in which the twelve teams played eight games each and then the top four advanced to the Meads Cup semifinals, while fifth to eighth advanced to the Lochore Cup semifinals. In both of these knockout stages the top seeds (first and fifth) played at home against the lowest seeds (fourth and eighth), the second highest seeds (second and sixth) played at home against the third highest seeds (third and seventh) and the final had the higher seed playing at home against the lower seed.

== Teams ==
Locations of teams in the 2015 Heartland Championship

The 2015 Heartland Championship was contested by the following teams.

Team	Super Rugby partner	Hometown	Home stadium	Capacity
Buller	Crusaders	Westport	Victoria Square	5,000
East Coast	Hurricanes	Ruatoria	Whakarua Park	3,000
Horowhenua-Kapiti	Hurricanes	Levin	Levin Domain	6,500
King Country	Chiefs	Taupō	Owen Delany Park	20,000
Mid Canterbury	Crusaders	Ashburton	Ashburton Showgrounds	5,000
North Otago	Highlanders	Oamaru	Whitestone Contracting Stadium	7,000
Poverty Bay	Hurricanes	Gisborne	More FM Rugby Park	18,000
South Canterbury	Crusaders	Timaru	Fraser Park	12,000
Thames Valley	Chiefs	Paeroa	Paeroa Domain	3,000
Wairarapa Bush	Hurricanes	Masterton	Trust House Memorial Park	10,000
Wanganui	Hurricanes	Wanganui	Cooks Gardens	15,000
West Coast	Crusaders	Greymouth	Rugby Park	6,000

== Standings ==
Pos.	Team	Pld	W	D	L	PF	PA	PD	TB	LB	Pts
1	South Canterbury	8	7	0	1	346	162	+184	7	0	35
2	Mid Canterbury	8	7	0	1	295	228	+67	5	1	34
3	Wanganui	8	6	1	1	318	185	+133	6	1	33
4	Wairarapa Bush	8	4	0	4	238	192	+46	5	2	23
5	Horowhenua-Kapiti	8	4	0	4	263	261	+2	5	2	23
6	Buller	8	4	0	4	200	187	+13	3	2	21
7	King Country	8	4	1	3	245	192	+53	3	0	21
8	North Otago	8	4	0	4	189	252	−63	2	2	20
9	Thames Valley	8	3	0	5	206	255	−49	4	0	16
10	West Coast	8	3	0	5	184	208	−24	3	1	16
11	Poverty Bay	8	1	0	7	227	333	−106	4	2	10
12	East Coast	8	0	0	8	112	368	−256	1	1	2

Meads Cup qualification
Lochore Cup qualification

In the case of two teams being tied on points, the ranking of teams is decided by:

- (1) the winner of the round robin match between the two provinces; then
- (2) highest point difference; then
- (3) most tries scored; then
- (4) a coin toss.

In the case of three or more teams being tied on points, the ranking of teams is decided by:

- (1) the province with the most wins against other tied provinces in the Round Robin; then
- (2) if two teams remain tied they shall be ranked according to the criteria listed above, but if more than two teams remain tied, they shall be ranked according to criteria (2) to (4) only.

== Finals ==
Meads Cup semi-finals
1	South Canterbury	25
4	Wairarapa Bush	21
2	Mid Canterbury	11
3	Wanganui	26

Meads Cup final
1	South Canterbury	11
3	Wanganui	28

Lochore Cup semi-finals
5	Horowhenua-Kapiti	12
8	North Otago	57
6	Buller	6
7	King Country	20

Lochore Cup final
7	King Country	47
8	North Otago	34

=== Semifinals ===
Meads Cup

17 October 2015	South Canterbury	25–21	Wairarapa Bush	Fraser Park, Timaru
14:30 (NZST)		Report

17 October 2015	Mid Canterbury	11–26	Wanganui	Ashburton Showgrounds, Ashburton
14:30 (NZST)		Report

Lochore Cup

17 October 2015	Horowhenua-Kapiti	12–57	North Otago	Levin Domain, Levin
14:00 (NZST)		Report

17 October 2015	Buller	6–20	King Country	Victoria Square, Westport
14:30 (NZST)		Report

=== Finals ===
Meads Cup

24 October 2015	South Canterbury	11–28	Wanganui	Fraser Park, Timaru
16:35 (NZST)		Report

Lochore Cup

24 October 2015	King Country	47–34	North Otago	Rugby Park, Te Kūiti
13:35 (NZST)		Report

== See also ==
- Hanan Shield competed for by Mid Canterbury, North Otago and South Canterbury
- Rundle Cup played between Buller and West Coast
- New Zealand Heartland XV
- Ranfurly Shield 2010–2019
- 2015 ITM Cup
