= 2018 Heartland Championship =

- Date: 25 August 2018–27 October 2018
- Countries: New Zealand

Final positions
- Champions: Thames Valley (Meads Cup); Horowhenua-Kapiti (Lochore Cup)
- Runner-up: South Canterbury (Meads Cup); Wairarapa Bush (Lochore Cup)

Tournament statistics
- Matches played: 54

The 2018 Heartland Championship, was the thirteenth edition of the Heartland Championship, a rugby union competition involving the twelve amateur provincial unions in New Zealand.

The tournament included a round-robin regular season in which the twelve teams played eight games each. The top eight teams from the regular season then advance to the semifinals:

- The teams ranked first to fourth play for the Meads Cup
- The teams ranked fifth to eighth play for the Lochore Cup.

The bottom four teams are eliminated.

== Teams ==
Locations of teams in the 2016 Heartland Championship

The 2018 Heartland Championship was contested by the following teams:

Team	Super Rugby partner	Hometown
Buller	Crusaders	Westport
East Coast	Hurricanes	Ruatoria
Horowhenua-Kapiti	Hurricanes	Levin
King Country	Chiefs	Taupō
Mid Canterbury	Crusaders	Ashburton
North Otago	Highlanders	Oamaru
Poverty Bay	Hurricanes	Gisborne
South Canterbury	Crusaders	Timaru
Thames Valley	Chiefs	Paeroa
Wairarapa Bush	Hurricanes	Masterton
Wanganui	Hurricanes	Wanganui
West Coast	Crusaders	Greymouth

== Regular season standings ==
In the regular season, Whanganui topped the standings with 39 points after winning all eight games. West Coast was deducted 6 points for fielding an ineligible player, the prop Tyler Morgan-Kearns. This meant that instead of coming 6th with 22 points they were dropped to 9th place with 16 points and therefore missing the Lochore Cup.

Pos.	Team	Pld	W	D	L	PF	PA	PD	TB	LB	Pts
1	Whanganui	8	8	0	0	331	113	+218	7	0	39
2	South Canterbury	8	6	0	2	341	151	+190	7	1	32
3	King Country	8	6	0	2	303	229	+72	6	1	31
4	Thames Valley	8	5	0	3	274	233	+41	7	1	28
5	Horowhenua-Kapiti	8	4	0	4	253	251	+2	6	2	24
6	Wairarapa Bush	8	4	0	4	212	195	+17	4	1	21
7	North Otago	8	4	0	4	213	209	+4	2	2	20
8	Mid Canterbury	8	3	0	5	225	233	−8	5	2	19
9	West Coast	8	4	0	4	228	241	−13	5	1	16
10	Buller	8	2	0	6	223	289	−66	5	3	16
11	Poverty Bay	8	2	0	6	193	302	−109	6	2	16
12	East Coast	8	0	0	8	97	447	−350	1	1	2

Meads Cup qualification
Lochore Cup qualification

In the case of a two-team tie on points the ranking of teams is decided by:
- (1) the winner of the round robin match between the two provinces; then
- (2) highest point difference; then
- (3) most tries scored; then
- (4) a coin toss.

In the case of a three-team or more tie on points the ranking of teams is decided by:

- (1) the province with the most wins against other tied provinces in the Round Robin; then
- (2) if two teams remain tied they shall be ranked according to the criteria listed above, but if more than two teams remain tied, they shall be ranked according to criteria (2) to (4) only.

== Finals ==
In the Meads Cup the top placegetter plays at their home ground against the fourth team while the second placed team plays at home against the third. In the Lochore Cup the fifth placegetter plays at their home ground against the eighth team while the sixth placed team plays at home against the seventh. The winning semi-finalists then meet in the respective finals for each Cup, played at the home-ground of the team ranked highest in the regular season.

=== Meads Cup ===
2018 was the first year that King Country made the Meads Cup semi-finals. They were the last of the twelve provinces to have achieved a "top 4" Meads Cup semi-final place. However, in their semi-final they could not compete with South Canterbury, going down 21–58 at Timaru.

Thames Valley had also not previously made the top 4. Although they only qualified 4th after the regular season, Thames Valley won their Meads Cup semi-final away to the top-ranked Whanganui and followed up with another away win over South Canterbury at Timaru to capture the Meads Cup for the first time.

Meads Cup semi-finals
2	South Canterbury	58
3	King Country	21
4	Thames Valley	17
1	Whanganui	7

Meads Cup final
2	South Canterbury	12
4	Thames Valley	17

=== Lochore Cup ===
Horowhenua-Kapiti who finished the regular season fifth and therefore top qualifier for the Lochore Cup accounted for Mid Canterbury, the previous year's Cup winner, in their semi-final. They then beat Wairarapa Bush by 26–23 in a closely fought final. It was the first Lochore Cup title for Horowhenua-Kapiti.

Lochore Cup semi-finals
1	Horowhenua-Kapiti	34
4	Mid Canterbury	24
2	Wairarapa Bush	30
3	North Otago	21

Lochore Cup final
1	Horowhenua-Kapiti	26
2	Wairarapa Bush	23

== See also ==
- Hanan Shield competed for by Mid Canterbury, North Otago and South Canterbury
- Rundle Cup played between Buller and West Coast
- New Zealand Heartland XV
- Ranfurly Shield 2010–2019
- 2018 Mitre 10 Cup
