= 2021 Heartland Championship =

- Date: 21 September 2021–14 November 2021
- Countries: New Zealand

Final positions
- Champions: South Canterbury (Meads Cup); Whanganui (Lochore Cup)
- Runner-up: Thames Valley (Meads Cup); North Otago (Lochore Cup)

Tournament statistics
- Matches played: 51

The 2021 Heartland Championship, was the 15th edition of the Heartland Championship, a rugby union competition involving the twelve amateur provincial unions in New Zealand. There was no Heartland Championship held in 2020 due to the COVID-19 restrictions.

The tournament included a round-robin regular season in which the twelve teams played eight games each. In past seasons the top eight teams from the regular season would then advance to the semifinals:

- The teams ranked first to fourth play for the Meads Cup
- The teams ranked fifth to eighth play for the Lochore Cup
- The bottom four teams are eliminated.

However, in the 2021 Heartland season there were no semifinals played and the top two teams played a final for the Meads Cup while the 3rd and 4th ranked teams played for the Lochore Cup.

2021 was the first year that the Osborne Taonga, a new trophy named after 16-test All Black Bill Osborne, was played for. It was awarded to the winner of a play off between the 5th and 6th ranked teams from the regular season. In the following seasons it will then be challenged for by Heartland teams, following similar rules to the Ranfurly Shield.

== Teams ==
Locations of teams in the 2016 Heartland Championship

The 2021 Heartland Championship was contested by the following teams:

Team	Coach	Super Rugby partner	Hometown
Buller	Justin "Gus" Martyn	Crusaders	Westport
East Coast	Hosea Gear	Hurricanes	Ruatoria
Horowhenua-Kapiti	Chris Wilton	Hurricanes	Levin
King Country	Craig Jeffries	Chiefs	Taupō and Te Kūiti
Mid Canterbury	Dale Palmer	Crusaders	Ashburton
North Otago	Jason Forrest	Highlanders	Oamaru
Poverty Bay	Tom Cairns & Miah Nikora	Hurricanes	Gisborne
South Canterbury	Nigel Walsh	Crusaders	Timaru
Thames Valley	David Harrison & Joe Murray	Chiefs	Paeroa
Wairarapa Bush	Mark Rutene	Hurricanes	Masterton
Wanganui	Jason Hamlin	Hurricanes	Whanganui
West Coast	Dave Perrin	Crusaders	Greymouth

== Regular season standings ==
In the regular season, South Canterbury topped the standings with the maximum 40 points after winning all eight games.

Pos.	Team	Pld	W	D	L	PF	PA	PD	TB	LB	Pts
1	South Canterbury	8	8	0	0	365	124	+241	8	0	40
2	Thames Valley	8	7	0	1	291	148	+143	5	0	33
3	Whanganui	8	6	0	2	286	149	+137	5	1	30
4	North Otago	8	5	0	3	220	198	+22	4	1	25
5	Poverty Bay	8	4	0	4	263	223	+40	5	3	24
6	Mid Canterbury	8	5	0	3	226	209	+17	4	0	24
7	Horowhenua-Kapiti	8	5	0	3	214	197	+17	3	1	24
8	East Coast	8	3	0	5	242	258	−16	6	2	20
9	West Coast	8	3	0	5	181	219	−38	2	2	16
10	Wairarapa Bush	8	2	0	6	139	254	−115	1	1	10
11	Buller	8	0	0	8	126	320	−194	2	0	2
12	King Country	8	0	0	8	113	367	−254	1	0	1

Meads Cup qualification
Lochore Cup qualification

All Black captain Sam Cane played for King Country.

East Coast had the services of former All Blacks Rico Gear, Hosea Gear and Ma'a Nonu.

== Finals ==
=== Meads Cup ===
In the Meads Cup final South Canterbury, the top ranked team from the regular season played at their home ground against the second placed team, Thames Valley. South Canterbury won the fixture by 35 points to 16.

The 2021 Heartland season was:

- the first year that South Canterbury won the Meads Cup.
- the 5th time a team had gone unbeaten during the regular season. South Canterbury joined Buller who achieved this in 2014 and Wanganui who were unbeaten in 2008, 2016 and 2018.
- the first time a team had achieved maximum 40 points.

=== Lochore Cup ===
In the Lochore Cup Whanganui, the third placed team from the regular season, played at their home ground against the fourth ranked North Otago.

Whanganui prevailed in the final by 22 points to 16.

=== Bill Osborne Taonga ===
The 5th ranked team from the regular season, Poverty Bay, was the inaugural winner of this trophy after beating the 6th placed Mid Canterbury by 33 points to 26. Poverty Bay therefore earned the right to defend the trophy in the 2022 season.

== See also ==
- Hanan Shield competed for by Mid Canterbury, North Otago and South Canterbury
- Rundle Cup played between Buller and West Coast
- New Zealand Heartland XV
- Ranfurly Shield 2020–2029
- 2021 Bunnings NPC
