= 2026 Heartland Championship =

- Date: 15 August 2026–18 October 2026
- Countries: New Zealand

Tournament statistics
- Matches played: 12

The 2026 Heartland Championship, is the 20th edition of the Heartland Championship, a rugby union competition involving the twelve amateur provincial unions in New Zealand.

The tournament begins with a round-robin stage in which the twelve teams played eight games each, from which the top four advance to the Meads Cup, while fifth to eighth best teams advance to the Lochore Cup. The four teams in each respective Cup play "knock out" semi-finals to determine the finalists. The top seeds in each (the first and fifth best teams in the regular season) play at home against the lowest seeds (fourth and eighth) while the second highest seeds (second and sixth best) play at home against the third highest seeds (third and seventh). The final of each cup features the higher seed playing at home against the lower seed.

== Teams ==
Locations of teams in the 2026 Heartland Championship

The 2026 Heartland Championship comprises the following teams:

Team	Super Rugby partner	Home ground(s)
Buller	Crusaders	Westport
Horowhenua-Kapiti	Hurricanes	Levin
King Country	Chiefs	Taupō, Taumarunui, Te Kūiti
Mid Canterbury	Crusaders	Ashburton
Ngati Porou East Coast	Chiefs	Ruatoria
North Otago	Highlanders	Oamaru
Poverty Bay	Hurricanes	Gisborne
South Canterbury	Crusaders	Timaru
Thames Valley	Chiefs	Coromandel, Paeroa, Te Aroha, Thames, Waihi
Wairarapa Bush	Hurricanes	Masterton
West Coast	Crusaders	Greymouth
Whanganui	Hurricanes	Whanganui

== Standings ==
Pos	Team	Pld	W	D	L	PF	PA	PD	TF	TA	TB	LB	Pts	Qualification
1	Mid Canterbury	8	6	0	2	305	214	+91	47	32	8	1	33	Qualification for the Meads Cup
2	North Otago	8	6	0	2	333	255	+78	51	40	7	1	32 (Note: Head-to-head: North Otago 32–31 King Country)	Qualification for the Meads Cup
3	King Country	8	6	0	2	363	215	+148	54	34	7	1	32	Qualification for the Meads Cup
4	Thames Valley	8	5	0	3	384	314	+70	56	48	8	1	29	Qualification for the Meads Cup
5	South Canterbury	8	5	0	3	391	253	+138	58	39	7	1	28	Qualification for the Lochore Cup
6	Horowhenua-Kapiti	8	5	0	3	310	251	+59	49	41	7	1	28	Qualification for the Lochore Cup
7	Whanganui	8	5	0	3	316	196	+120	49	28	6	1	27	Qualification for the Lochore Cup
8	Wairarapa Bush	8	5	0	3	277	250	+27	40	36	5	0	25	Qualification for the Lochore Cup
9	Poverty Bay	8	2	0	6	268	320	−52	44	49	5	1	14	
10	Buller	8	2	0	6	190	391	−201	29	59	5	1	14	
11	East Coast	8	1	0	7	226	430	−204	36	66	4	0	8	
12	West Coast	8	0	0	8	209	483	−274	33	74	5	1	6	

Source: Heartland Championship
Rules for classification: 1) Competition points; 2) Head to head; 3) Match points difference; 4) Tries scored; 5) Match points scored; 6) Coin toss

== Regular season ==
=== Round 1 ===
15 August 2026	Ngati Porou East Coast	20–44	South Canterbury	Whakarua Park, Ruatoria
13:00 (NZST)		Report

15 August 2026	T – Horowhenua Kapiti	41–45	King Country	Levin Domain, Levin
13:00 (NZST)		Report

15 August 2026	Poverty Bay	17–20	Wairarapa Bush	Rugby Park, Gisborne
13:00 (NZST)		Report

15 August 2026	West Coast	21–62	Whanganui	John Sturgeon Park, Greymouth
13:00 (NZST)		Report

15 August 2026	Thames Valley	89–26	Buller	Rhodes Park, Thames
13:00 (NZST)		Report

15 August 2026	H – North Otago	37–26	Mid Canterbury	Whitestone Contracting Stadium, Oamaru
14:30 (NZST)		Report

=== Round 2 ===
22 August 2026	Buller	22–21	North Otago	Victoria Square, Westport
13:00 (NZST)

22 August 2026	T – King Country	48–29	Thames Valley	Taumaranui Domain, Taumaranui
13:00 (NZST)

22 August 2026	Mid Canterbury	29–19	Wairarapa Bush	Ashburton Showgrounds, Ashburton
13:00 (NZST)

22 August 2026	Poverty Bay	12–29	Horowhenua Kapiti	Rugby Park, Gisborne
13:00 (NZST)

22 August 2026	South Canterbury	85–10	West Coast	Fraser Park, Timaru
13:00 (NZST)

22 August 2026	Whanganui	59–10	Ngati Porou East Coast	Cooks Gardens, Whanganui
13:00 (NZST)

=== Round 3 ===
29 August 2026	North Otago	32–31	King Country	Whitestone Contracting Stadium, Oamaru
13:00 (NZST)

29 August 2026	South Canterbury	73–10	Buller	Fraser Park, Timaru
13:00 (NZST)

29 August 2026	Wairarapa Bush	46–31	Horowhenua-Kapiti	Trust House Memorial Park, Masterton
13:00 (NZST)

29 August 2026	West Coast	35–59	Thames Valley	John Sturgeon Park, Greymouth
13:00 (NZST)

29 August 2026	Whanganui	43–15	Poverty Bay	Cooks Gardens, Whanganui
13:00 (NZST)

29 August 2026	Ngati Porou East Coast	17–57	Mid Canterbury	Whakarua Park, Ruatoria
14:30 (NZST)

=== Round 4 ===
5 September 2026	Horowhenua-Kapiti	19–17	Whanganui	Levin Domain
13:00 (NZST)

5 September 2026	T – King Country	55–22	South Canterbury	Rugby Park, Te Kuiti
13:00 (NZST)

5 September 2026	Mid Canterbury	43–35	Buller	Ashburton Showgrounds
13:00 (NZST)

5 September 2026	Poverty Bay	27–45	North Otago	More FM Rugby Park, Gisborne
13:00 (NZST)

5 September 2026	Thames Valley	47–36	Wairarapa Bush	Rhodes Park, Thames
13:00 (NZST)

5 September 2026	West Coast	43–66	Ngati Porou East Coast	John Sturgeon Park, Greymouth
13:00 (NZST)

=== Round 5 ===
12 September 2026	Ngati Porou East Coast	34–50	Horowhenua-Kapiti	Whakarua Park, Ruatoria
13:00 (NZST)

12 September 2026	North Otago	39–57	Whanganui	Whitestone Contracting Stadium, Oamaru
13:00 (NZST)

12 September 2026	Thames Valley	57–31	Poverty Bay	Rhodes Park, Thames
13:00 (NZST)

12 September 2026	Wairarapa Bush	38–54	King Country	Trust House Memorial Park, Masterton
13:00 (NZST)

12 September 2026	Buller	38–31	West Coast	Victoria Square, Westport
14:30 (NZST)

12 September 2026	Mid Canterbury	43–45	South Canterbury	Ashburton Showgrounds, Ashburton
14:30 (NZST)

=== Round 6 ===
19 September 2026	Buller	21–25	Wairarapa Bush	Victoria Square, Westport
13:00 (NZST)

19 September 2026	Horowhenua-Kapiti	57–26	Thames Valley	Levin Domain, Levin
13:00 (NZST)

19 September 2026	T – King Country	52–10	Ngati Porou East Coast	Owen Delany Park, Taupo
13:00 (NZST)

19 September 2026	Poverty Bay	68–31	West Coast	Rugby Park, Gisborne
13:00 (NZST)

19 September 2026	Whanganui	22–34	Mid Canterbury	Cooks Gardens, Whanganui
13:00 (NZST)

19 September 2026	South Canterbury	28–43	North Otago – H	Fraser Park, Timaru
14:30 (NZST)

=== Round 7 ===
26 September 2026	Horowhenua-Kapiti	31–45	North Otago	Levin Domain, Levin
13:00 (NZST)

26 September 2026	T – King Country	57–12	Buller	Taumaranui Domain, Taumaranui
13:00 (NZST)

26 September 2026	Ngati Porou East Coast	43–69	Poverty Bay	Whakarua Park, Ruatoria
13:00 (NZST)

26 September 2026	Wairarapa Bush	37–25	Whanganui	Trust House Memorial Park, Masterton
13:00 (NZST)

26 September 2026	West Coast	5–34	Mid Canterbury	John Sturgeon Park, Greymouth
13:00 (NZST)

26 September 2026	Thames Valley	43–42	South Canterbury	Lyon Park, Whitianga
14:30 (NZST)

=== Round 8 ===
3 October 2026	Buller	26–52	Horowhenua-Kapiti	Victoria Square, Westport
14:00 (NZST)

3 October 2026	Mid Canterbury	39–34	Thames Valley	Ashburton Showgrounds, Ashburton
14:00 (NZST)

3 October 2026	North Otago	71–33	West Coast	Whitestone Contracting Stadium, Oamaru
14:00 (NZST)

3 October 2026	South Canterbury	52–29	Poverty Bay	Fraser Park, Timaru
14:00 (NZST)

3 October 2026	Wairarapa Bush	56–26	Ngati Porou East Coast	Trust House Memorial Park, Masterton
14:00 (NZST)

3 October 2026	Whanganui	31–21	King Country	Cooks Gardens, Whanganui
14:00 (NZST)

- H – Hanan Shield fixture
- T – Bill Osborne Taonga fixture

== Finals ==
In the Meads Cup the top placegetter plays at their home ground against the fourth team while the second placed team plays at home against the third. In the Lochore Cup the fifth placegetter plays at their home ground against the eighth team while the sixth placed team plays at home against the seventh. The winning semi-finalists then meet in the respective finals for each Cup, played at the home-ground of the team ranked highest in the regular season.

=== Lochore Cup ===
==== Bracket ====
5th–8th semi-finals
5	South Canterbury	36
8	Wairarapa Bush	26
6	Horowhenua-Kapiti	38
7	Whanganui (a.e.t.)	39

5th place final
5	South Canterbury	42
7	Whanganui	43

==== 5th–8th semi-finals ====
10 October 2026	Horowhenua-Kapiti	38–39 (a.e.t.)	Whanganui	Levin Domain, Levin
13:00		Source

10 October 2026	South Canterbury	36–26	Wairarapa Bush	Fraser Park, Timaru
14:00		Source

==== 5th place final ====
18 October 2026	South Canterbury	42–43	Whanganui	Fraser Park, Timaru
13:05		Source

=== Meads Cup ===
==== Bracket ====
Semi-finals
1	Mid Canterbury	37
4	Thames Valley	28
2	North Otago	24
3	King Country	36

Final
1	Mid Canterbury	14
3	King Country	24

==== Semi-finals ====
10 October 2026	North Otago	24–36	King Country	Whitestone Contracting Stadium, Oamaru
13:00		Source

10 October 2026	Mid Canterbury	37–28	Thames Valley	Ashburton Showgrounds, Ashburton
14:00		Source

==== Final ====
17 October 2026	Mid Canterbury	14–24	King Country	Ashburton Showgrounds, Ashburton
13:05		Source

== Bill Osborne Taonga ==
Since 2022 Heartland teams have played for challenge trophy, named after 16-test All Black Bill Osborne and based on similar rules to the Ranfurly Shield played for by National Provincial Championship teams.

Horowhenua-Kapiti started the 2026 season as the holder of the Bill Osborne Taonga having secured it by beating King Country 46-36 in September 2025 and subsequently defending it against West Coast and Wairarapa Bush

=== 2026 Challenges ===
King Country won the Taonga off Horowhenua-Kapiti in the 1st Round with a 45-41 win at Levin. King Country then defended it against:

- Thames Valley 48-29
- South Canterbury 55-22
- East Coast 52-10
- Buller 57-12.

== Ian Kirkpatrick Medal ==
Since 2022, at the end of each season a Heartland Championship Player of the Year is chosen and awarded this medal named after former All Blacks captain Ian Kirkpatrick.

The previous season's Ian Kirkpatrick Medal winner was Keanu Taumata the Poverty Bay flanker and co-captain. The other finalists were Declan McCormack (Mid Canterbury) and Sam Walton-Sexton (Wairarapa Bush).

== See also ==
- Hanan Shield competed for by Mid Canterbury, North Otago and South Canterbury
- Rundle Cup played between Buller and West Coast
- New Zealand Heartland XV
- Ranfurly Shield 2020–2029
- 2026 Hilux NPC
