= 2013 Heartland Championship =

- Date: 24 August 2013–27 October 2013
- Countries: New Zealand

Final positions
- Champions: Mid Canterbury (Meads Cup), South Canterbury (Lochore Cup)
- Runner-up: North Otago (Meads Cup), Buller (Lochore Cup)

The 2013 Heartland Championship, the eighth edition of the Heartland Championship since the 2006 reconstruction, was a rugby union competition involving the twelve amateur rugby unions in New Zealand. The tournament involved a round-robin stage in which the twelve teams played eight games each and then the top four advanced to the Meads Cup semifinals, while fifth to eighth advanced to the Lochore Cup semifinals. In both of these knockout stages the top seeds (first and fifth) played at home against the lowest seeds (fourth and eighth), the second highest seeds (second and sixth) played at home against the third highest seeds (third and seventh) and the final had the higher seed play at home against the lower seed.

== Teams ==
Locations of teams in the 2013 Heartland Championship

The 2013 Heartland Championship was contested by the following teams:

Team	Super Rugby partner	Hometown	Home stadium	Capacity
Buller	Crusaders	Westport	Victoria Square	5,000
East Coast	Hurricanes	Ruatoria	Whakarua Park	3,000
Horowhenua-Kapiti	Hurricanes	Levin	Levin Domain	6,500
King Country	Chiefs	Taupō	Owen Delany Park	20,000
Mid Canterbury	Crusaders	Ashburton	Ashburton Showgrounds	5,000
North Otago	Highlanders	Oamaru	Whitestone Contracting Stadium	7,000
Poverty Bay	Hurricanes	Gisborne	More FM Rugby Park	18,000
South Canterbury	Crusaders	Timaru	Fraser Park	12,000
Thames Valley	Chiefs	Paeroa	Paeroa Domain	3,000
Wairarapa Bush	Hurricanes	Masterton	Trust House Memorial Park	10,000
Wanganui	Hurricanes	Wanganui	Cooks Gardens	15,000
West Coast	Crusaders	Greymouth	Rugby Park	6,000

== Pre-season ==
Two Heartland Championship teams – Horowhenua-Kapiti and East Coast – challenged Waikato for the Ranfurly Shield in two matches that took place in at Whakarua Park, Ruatoria and Campbell Park, Morrinsville.

18 July 2013
18:00 (NZST)

Waikato	85–0	Horowhenua-Kapiti

Campbell Park, Morrinsville

30 July 2013
18:00 (NZST)

East Coast	10–65	Waikato

Whakarua Park, Ruatoria

== Standings ==
Pos.	Team	Pld	W	D	L	PF	PA	PD	TB	LB	Pts
1	Mid Canterbury	8	7	0	1	232	131	+101	4	1	33
2	North Otago	8	6	0	2	216	159	+57	3	2	29
3	Wairarapa Bush	8	6	0	2	203	144	+59	3	1	28
4	West Coast	8	6	0	2	190	173	+17	4	0	28
5	South Canterbury	8	4	0	4	246	202	+44	3	4	23
6	Wanganui	8	4	0	4	171	160	+11	2	3	21
7	Buller	8	4	0	4	147	149	−2	2	2	20
8	Thames Valley	8	4	0	4	153	200	−37	0	1	17
9	King Country	8	3	0	5	163	211	−48	1	2	15
10	East Coast	8	2	0	6	173	225	−52	3	2	13
11	Horowhenua-Kapiti	8	1	0	7	141	182	−41	0	6	10
12	Poverty Bay	8	1	0	7	141	240	−99	0	2	6

Meads Cup and Heartland Championship
Lochore Cup qualification

In the case of two teams being tied on points, the ranking of teams is decided by:

- (1) the winner of the round robin match between the two provinces; then
- (2) highest point difference; then
- (3) most tries scored; then
- (4) a coin toss.

In the case of three or more teams being tied on points the ranking of teams is decided by:

- (1) the province with the most wins against other tied provinces in the Round Robin; then
- (2) if two teams remain tied they shall be ranked according to the criteria listed above, but if more than two teams remain tied, they shall be ranked according to criteria (2) to (4) only.

== Finals ==
Meads Cup semi-finals
1	Mid Canterbury	28
4	West Coast	25
2	North Otago	48
3	Wairarapa Bush	34

Meads Cup final
1	Mid Canterbury	26
2	North Otago	20

Lochore Cup semi-finals
5	South Canterbury	14
8	Thames Valley	8
6	Wanganui	30
7	Buller	40

Lochore Cup final
5	South Canterbury	17
7	Buller	10

== See also ==
- Hanan Shield competed for by Mid Canterbury, North Otago and South Canterbury
- Rundle Cup played between Buller and West Coast
- New Zealand Heartland XV
- Ranfurly Shield 2010–2019
- 2013 ITM Cup
