= 2025 Heartland Championship =

- Date: 16 August 2025–19 October 2025
- Countries: New Zealand

Final positions
- Champions: Mid Canterbury (Meads Cup) (Lochore Cup)
- Runner-up: Thames Valley (Meads Cup) (Lochore Cup)

Tournament statistics
- Matches played: 54

The 2025 Heartland Championship, is the 19th edition of the Heartland Championship, a rugby union competition involving the twelve amateur provincial unions in New Zealand.

The tournament began with a round-robin stage in which the twelve teams played eight games each, from which the top four advance to the Meads Cup, while fifth to eighth best teams advance to the Lochore Cup. The four teams in each respective Cup play "knock out" semi-finals to determine the finalists. The top seeds in each (the first and fifth best teams in the regular season) play at home against the lowest seeds (fourth and eighth) while the second highest seeds (second and sixth best) play at home against the third highest seeds (third and seventh). The final of each cup features the higher seed playing at home against the lower seed.

== Teams ==
Locations of teams in the 2025 Heartland Championship

The 2025 Heartland Championship comprises the following teams:

Team	Coach	Home ground(s)	Super Rugby partner
Buller	Craig Adams	Westport	Crusaders
Horowhenua-Kapiti	Aleni Feagaiga	Levin	Hurricanes
King Country	Aarin Dunster	Taupō, Taumarunui, Te Kūiti	Chiefs
Mid Canterbury	Matt Winter	Ashburton	Crusaders
Ngati Porou East Coast	Kahu Tamatea	Ruatoria	Chiefs
North Otago	Luke Herden	Oamaru	Highlanders
Poverty Bay	Paoraian Manuel-Harman	Gisborne	Hurricanes
South Canterbury	Nigel Walsh	Timaru	Crusaders
Thames Valley	David Harrison & Joe Murray	Coromandel, Paeroa, Te Aroha, Thames, Waihi	Chiefs
Wairarapa Bush	Jamie Williams	Masterton	Hurricanes
West Coast	Jared Mitchell	Greymouth	Crusaders
Whanganui	Jason Hamlin	Whanganui	Hurricanes

== Regular season ==
The following are the results from the regular season.

=== Round 1 ===
16 August 2025

Thames Valley	34–50	Mid Canterbury

Waihi

16 August 2025

Whanganui	39–21	North Otago

Whanganui

16 August 2025

Wairarapa Bush	29–50	South Canterbury

Masterton

16 August 2025

Horowhenua Kapiti	59–14	Buller

Levin

16 August 2025

Poverty Bay	18–8	Ngati Porou East Coast

Rugby Park, Gisborne

16 August 2025

West Coast	38–18	King Country

Greymouth

=== Round 2 ===
23 August 2025

Ngati Porou East Coast	21–80	West Coast

Ruatoria

23 August 2025

Mid Canterbury	40–27	Horowhenua-Kapiti

Ashburton

23 August 2025

King Country	47–26	Poverty Bay

Te Kuiti

23 August 2025

North Otago	29–56	Wairarapa Bush

Oamaru

23 August 2025

Buller	24–51	Whanganui

Westport

23 August 2025

South Canterbury	35–34	Thames Valley

Timaru

=== Round 3 ===
30 August 2025

Ngati Porou East Coast	19–48	North Otago

Ruatoria

30 August 2025

Wairarapa Bush	33–36	Mid Canterbury

Masterton

30 August 2025

Buller	24–64	South Canterbury

Westport

30 August 2025

Horowhenua-Kapiti	19–26	Poverty Bay

Levin

30 August 2025

Thames Valley	24–20	King Country

Te Aroha

30 August 2025

Whanganui	19–38	West Coast

Whanganui

=== Round 4 ===
6 September 2025

Mid Canterbury	82–7	Ngati Porou East Coast

Ashburton

6 September 2025

Poverty Bay	38–3	Buller

Gisborne

6 September 2025

West Coast	14–24	Wairarapa Bush

Greymouth

6 September 2025

King Country	36–46	Horowhenua Kapiti

Te Kuiti

6 September 2025

North Otago	45–36	Thames Valley

Oamaru

6 September 2025

South Canterbury	35–24	Whanganui

Timaru

=== Round 5 ===
13 September 2025

Buller	5–40	Thames Valley

Westport

13 September 2025

Horowhenua Kapiti	27–26	West Coast

Levin

13 September 2025

King Country	24–25	Wairarapa Bush

Taupo

13 September 2025

North Otago	59–33	Poverty Bay

Oamaru

13 September 2025

South Canterbury	18–34	Mid Canterbury

Timaru

13 September 2025

Ngati Porou East Coast	19–64	Whanganui

Ruatoria

=== Round 6 ===
20 September 2025

Mid Canterbury	32–17	King Country

Ashburton

20 September 2025

Poverty Bay	41–35	South Canterbury

Gisborne

20 September 2025

Thames Valley	84–5	Ngati Porou East Coast

Coromandel

20 September 2025

Wairarapa Bush	73–27	Buller

Masterton

20 September 2025

Whanganui	27–21	Horowhenua Kapiti

Whanganui

20 September 2025

West Coast	31–38	North Otago

Greymouth

=== Round 7 ===
27 September 2025

Buller	21–19	Ngati Porou East Coast

Westport

27 September 2025

Horowhenua Kapiti	22–21	Wairarapa Bush

Levin

27 September 2025

King Country	24–29	Whanganui

Taumarunui

27 September 2025

North Otago	32–29	South Canterbury

Oamaru

27 September 2025

Poverty Bay	43–47	Mid Canterbury

Gisborne

27 September 2025

Thames Valley	43–7	West Coast

Paeroa

=== Round 8 ===
4 October 2025

Ngati Porou East Coast	14–73	King Country

Ruatoria

4 October 2025

Mid Canterbury	47–7	North Otago

Ashburton

4 October 2025

South Canterbury	31–21	Horowhenua Kapiti

Timaru

4 October 2025

Wairarapa Bush	29–24	Poverty Bay

Masterton

4 October 2025

Whanganui	5–38	Thames Valley

Whanganui

4 October 2025

West Coast	34–11	Buller

Greymouth

In September West Coast were sanctioned with a financial penalty of $5,000 and 15 competition points for a breach of Heartland Championship player eligibility rules.

== Regular season standings ==
In the 2025 season Mid Canterbury were clearly dominant going unbeaten through the regular season and gaining the maximum 40 points. On the field they scored 368 points versus 186 against. The 2025 Heartland regular season was a very even competition with five teams winning 5 of their 8 matches. Three teams won 4 of their 8 games but one of those teams, West Coast, was unable to make the semi-finals due to the loss of 15 competition points.

Last year's Meads Cup champion Thames Valley was third after the regular season, as they had been in 2024. The 2024 Lochore Cup winner did not make the semi-finals this season.

Pos.	Team	Pld	W	D	L	PF	PA	PD	BP	Pts
1	Mid Canterbury	8	8	0	0	368	186	+182	0	40
2	South Canterbury	8	5	0	3	297	239	+58	4	29
3	Thames Valley	8	5	0	3	335	172	+163	4	29
4	Wairarapa Bush	8	5	0	3	290	226	+64	3	28
5	Whanganui	8	5	0	3	258	220	+38	1	26
6	North Otago	8	5	0	3	279	290	−11	1	26
7	Poverty Bay	8	4	0	4	249	247	+2	5	25
8	Horowhenua Kapiti	8	4	0	4	242	221	+21	1	21
9	King Country	8	2	0	6	259	234	+25	5	15
10	West Coast	8	4	0	4	268	203	+65	8 (−15)	9
11	Buller	8	1	0	7	129	378	−249	2	7
12	Ngati Porou East Coast	8	0	0	8	112	470	−358	1	1

Meads Cup qualification
Lochore Cup qualification

== Finals ==
In the Meads Cup the top placegetter plays at their home ground against the fourth team while the second placed team plays at home against the third. In the Lochore Cup the fifth placegetter plays at their home ground against the eighth team while the sixth placed team plays at home against the seventh. The winning semi-finalists then meet in the respective finals for each Cup, played at the home-ground of the team ranked highest in the regular season.

=== Meads Cup ===
In the Meads Cup the top team from the regular season, Mid Canterbury, played the 4th placed Wairarapa Bush in their semi-final at Ashburton. Mid Canterbury won a close match 21–19 to qualify for the final.

In the other semi-final South Canterbury played Thames Valley at Timaru. Thames Valley prevailed by 61–31 with their No 8 Aporosa Vuniyayawa scoring four tries.

In the Meads Cup final Mid Canterbury beat Thames Valley 21–18 at Ashburton.

==== Bracket ====
Semi-finals
1	Mid Canterbury	21
4	Wairarapa Bush	19
2	South Canterbury	31
3	Thames Valley	61

Final
1	Mid Canterbury	21
3	Thames Valley	18

==== Semi-finals ====
11 October 2025	Mid Canterbury	21–19	Wairarapa Bush	Ashburton Showgrounds, Ashburton
13:35	Try: Samo (2) 9', 26'; Con: Reekie (1/2) 10', 15; Pen: Reekie (3/3) 4', 12', 40+1'	Report	Try: Finau Vea 16'; Walton-Sexton 34'; Cunningham 74'; Con: Eschenbach (2/3) 35', 75'; Cards: Malatai (yellow card) 76'

11 October 2025	South Canterbury	31–61	Thames Valley	Fraser Park, Timaru
15:35	Try: Leatigaga 13'; Saunders 30'; Filimoehala 40+1'; Masi 41'; Con: Wright (4/4) 14', 31', 40+2', 42'; Pen: Wright (1/1) 7'	Report	Try: Vuniyayawa (4) 10', 26', 36', 60'; Vakapuna Etoni 44'; Davenport 48'; Allen 53'; Con: Collard (7/7) 11', 27', 37', 45', 49', 54', 61'; Pen: Collard (4/4) 17', 56, 68', 72'

==== Final ====
18 October 2025
14:05

Mid Canterbury	21–18	Thames Valley
Try: McCormack 10'; Best 28'; McClea 49'; Con: Reekie (3/3) 11', 29', 50'; Pen: Reelie (0/1)	Report	Try: Allen 54'; Lafituanai 61'; Con: Collard (1/2) 62'; Pen: Collard (0/1); Cards: Huiarangi (yellow card) 75'

Ashburton Showgrounds, Ashburton

=== Lochore Cup ===
Whanganui finished the regular season 5th and therefore top qualifier for the Lochore Cup. In their semi-final they played at home against Horowhenua Kapiti. However, in a game that went to extra time, Horowhenua Kapiti upset them 40–18.

In the other semi-final North Otago played at Oamaru against Poverty Bay, winning a close match by 48–46.

In the Lochore Cup final North Otago beat Horowhenua Kapiti 64–47 in a high-scoring match at Oamaru.

== Bill Osborne Taonga ==
Since 2022 Heartland teams have played for challenge trophy, named after 16-test All Black Bill Osborne and based on similar rules to the Ranfurly Shield played for by National Provincial Championship teams. King Country started the 2025 season as the holder of the Bill Osborne Taonga having secured it by beating Whanganui 34–17 in October 2024.

=== Challenges ===
- 23 August – King Country 47 Poverty Bay 26
- 6 September – King Country 36 Horowhenua Kapiti 46
- 13 September – Horowhenua Kapiti 27 West Coast 26
- 27 September – Horowhenua Kapiti 22 vs Wairarapa Bush 21

== Ian Kirkpatrick Medal ==
At the end of each season (since 2022), a Heartland Championship Player of the Year will be chosen and they will be awarded this medal, named after former All Blacks captain Ian Kirkpatrick.

The 2025 Ian Kirkpatrick winner was Keanu Taumata the Poverty Bay flanker and co-captain.

The previous season's winner was Alekesio Vakarorogo (Whanganui).

== See also ==
- Hanan Shield competed for by Mid Canterbury, North Otago and South Canterbury
- Rundle Cup played between Buller and West Coast
- New Zealand Heartland XV
- Ranfurly Shield 2020–2029
- 2025 Bunnings NPC
