= 2024 Heartland Championship =

- Date: 17 August 2024–19 October 2024
- Countries: New Zealand

Final positions
- Champions: Thames Valley (Meads Cup); King Country (Lochore Cup)
- Runner-up: Mid Canterbury (Meads Cup); West Coast (Lochore Cup)

Tournament statistics
- Matches played: 54

The 2024 Heartland Championship, was the 18th edition of the Heartland Championship, a rugby union competition involving the twelve amateur provincial unions in New Zealand.

The tournament began with a round-robin stage in which the twelve teams played eight games each, from which the top four advanced to the Meads Cup semifinals, while fifth to eighth advanced to the Lochore Cup semifinals. In both of these knockout stages the top seeds (first and fifth) played at home against the lowest seeds (fourth and eighth), the second highest seeds (second and sixth) played at home against the third highest seeds (third and seventh) and the final featured the higher seed playing at home against the lower seed.

== Teams ==
Locations of teams in the 2016 Heartland Championship

The 2024 Heartland Championship was contested by the following teams:

Team	Super Rugby partner	Coach	Home ground(s)
Buller	Crusaders	Craig Adams	Westport
Horowhenua-Kapiti	Hurricanes	Aleni Feagaiga	Levin
King Country	Chiefs	Aarin Dunster	Taupō, Taumarunui, Te Kūiti
Mid Canterbury	Crusaders	Matt Winter	Ashburton
Ngati Porou East Coast	Hurricanes	Kahu Tamatea	Ruatoria
North Otago	Highlanders	Jason Forrest	Oamaru
Poverty Bay	Hurricanes	Miah Nikora	Gisborne
South Canterbury	Crusaders	Nigel Walsh	Timaru
Thames Valley	Chiefs	David Harrison & Joe Murray	Paeroa
Wairarapa Bush	Hurricanes	Reece Robinson	Masterton
West Coast	Crusaders	Sean Cuttance	Greymouth
Whanganui	Hurricanes	Jason Hamlin	Whanganui

== Regular season standings ==
In September 2022 Horowhenua-Kapiti played South Canterbury at Eden Park. South Canterbury won the match by 28–24. It was just the fourth time Horowhenua-Kapiti had played at Eden Park and the sixth time for South Canterbury.

In the regular season, South Canterbury topped the standings with 40 points after winning all eight games.

Pos.	Team	Pld	W	D	L	PF	PA	PD	BP	Pts
1	South Canterbury	8	8	0	0	327	214	+113	8	40
2	Whanganui	8	6	0	2	383	199	+184	7	31
3	Thames Valley	8	6	0	2	348	190	+158	7	31
4	Mid Canterbury	8	6	0	2	297	215	+82	6	30
5	King Country	8	5	0	3	276	179	+97	8	28
6	Horowhenua-Kapiti	8	4	0	4	244	289	−45	6	22
7	East Coast	8	4	0	4	212	236	−24	4	20
8	West Coast	8	3	0	5	228	265	−37	8	20
9	North Otago	8	2	0	6	240	201	+39	6	14
10	Wairarapa Bush	8	2	0	6	246	393	−147	5	13
11	Buller	8	2	0	6	142	402	−260	2	10
12	Poverty Bay	8	0	0	8	190	350	−160	6	6

Meads Cup qualification
Lochore Cup qualification

== Finals ==
In the Meads Cup the top placegetter plays at their home ground against the fourth team while the second placed team plays at home against the third. In the Lochore Cup the fifth placegetter plays at their home ground against the eighth team while the sixth placed team plays at home against the seventh. The winning semi-finalists then meet in the respective finals for each Cup, played at the home-ground of the team ranked highest in the regular season.

=== Meads Cup ===
In the 2024 season South Canterbury once again went unbeaten through the regular season. They scored 327 points, down from 341 the previous year. However, South Canterbury were upset in semi-final 16–17 by their neighbours Mid Canterbury.

In the other semi-final Thames Valley travelled to Cooks Gardens and beat Whanganui by a comfortable 38–15.

The final was played at Boyd Park with the home team Thames Valley beating Mid Canterbury 37–29.

=== Lochore Cup ===
King Country finished the regular season 5th and therefore top qualifier for the Lochore Cup. They won their semi-final in a close victory 34–31 over Ngati Porou East Coast. In the other semi-final Horowhenua-Kapiti the 6th placegetter in the regular season were upset, losing to West Coast by 51–52 at the Levin Domain.

The Lochore Cup Final was another close battle with King Country edging West Coast by 46–44.

== Bill Osborne Taonga ==
Since 2022 Heartland teams have played for this challenge trophy, named after 16-test All Black Bill Osborne and based on similar rules to the Ranfurly Shield played for by National Provincial Championship teams. Whereas in 2023 Ngati Porou East Coast retained the Bill Osborne Taonga in all four challenges, only one out of six challenges was successfully defended in the 2024 season. Ngati Porou East Coast lost the first challenge from Buller. Buller then lost the Taonga to King Country who then lost it to Thames Valley. Thames Valley in turn lost it to Whanganui who managed to win their first defence against Wairarapa Bush. However Whanganui lost the Taonga to King Country in their second defence.

=== Challenges ===
- 17 August - Ngati Porou East Coast 11 Buller 13
- 24 August - Buller 27 King Country 54
- 31 August - King Country 18 Thames Valley 23
- 7 September - Thames Valley 14 Whanganui 16
- 21 September - Whanganui 56 Wairarapa Bush 17
- 5 October - Whanganui 17 - King Country 34

== Ian Kirkpatrick Medal ==
Since 2022, the Heartland Championship Player of the Year award has been awarded a medal named after former All Blacks captain Ian Kirkpatrick.The 2024 winner was Alekesio Vakarorogo (Whanganui).

== Heartland XV ==
In October the 2024 New Zealand Heartland XV team was named (*denotes potential debut).

- Anthony Amato (South Canterbury)*
- Matty Axtens (Thames Valley) *
- Quinn Collard (Thames Valley) *
- Toddy Doolan (Thames Valley)
- Hika Elliot (South Canterbury) *
- Sione Etoni (Thames Valley) *
- Oneone Faafou (Thames Valley) *
- Tokoma’ata Fakatava (South Canterbury)
- Paula Fifita (South Canterbury)
- Kaleb Foote (King Country)
- Kristian Gent-Standen (King Country) *
- Poleka Itielu (Horowhenua-Kapiti) *
- Finlay Joyce (South Canterbury)
- Siu Kakala (South Canterbury) *
- Te Huia Kutia (Thames Valley)
- Peceli Malanicagi (Whanganui)
- Declan McCormack (Mid Canterbury) *
- Clarence Moli (South Canterbury) *
- Ethan Robinson (Whanganui) *
- Tyler Rogers Holden (Whanganui)*
- Raitube Vasurakuta (Mid Canterbury)
- Logan Wakefield (Wairarapa Bush) *
- Dallas Wiki (Horowhenua-Kapiti) *
- Adam Williamson (Mid Canterbury)
- William Wright (South Canterbury)

=== Management team ===
- Head Coach – Nigel Walsh (South Canterbury)
- Assistant Coach – Miah Nikora (Poverty Bay)
- Observer Coaches – Aleni Feagaiga (Horowhenua-Kapiti) & David Harrison (Thames Valley)
- Manager – Tommy Zimmerman (Horowhenua-Kapiti)
- Physio – Geoff Thompson (South Canterbury)
- Trainer – Slade King (Rotorua)

=== Heartland XV matches ===
The Heartland XV played a two-match series at Whanganui against:

- a New Zealand Māori Selection on October 29, losing 14–47
- the New Zealand Barbarians on November 2, losing 21–40.

== See also ==
- Hanan Shield competed for by Mid Canterbury, North Otago and South Canterbury
- Rundle Cup played between Buller and West Coast
- Ranfurly Shield 2020–2029
- 2024 Bunnings NPC
