= 2023 Heartland Championship =

- Date: 12 August 2023–14 October 2023
- Countries: New Zealand

Final positions
- Champions: South Canterbury (Meads Cup); West Coast (Lochore Cup)
- Runner-up: Whanganui (Meads Cup); Poverty Bay (Lochore Cup)

Tournament statistics
- Matches played: 54

The 2023 Heartland Championship, was the 17th edition of the Heartland Championship, a rugby union competition involving the twelve amateur provincial unions in New Zealand.

The tournament began with a round-robin stage in which the twelve teams played eight games each, from which the top four advanced to the Meads Cup semifinals, while fifth to eighth advanced to the Lochore Cup semifinals. In both of these knockout stages the top seeds (first and fifth) played at home against the lowest seeds (fourth and eighth), the second highest seeds (second and sixth) played at home against the third highest seeds (third and seventh) and the final featured the higher seed playing at home against the lower seed.

== Teams ==
Locations of teams in the 2016 Heartland Championship

The 2023 Heartland Championship was contested by the following teams:

Team	Super Rugby partner	Coach	Home ground(s)
Buller	Crusaders	Nathan Thompson	Westport
Horowhenua-Kapiti	Hurricanes	Aleni Feagaiga	Levin
King Country	Chiefs	Aarin Dunster	Taupō, Taumarunui, Te Kūiti
Mid Canterbury	Crusaders	John Sherratt	Ashburton
Ngati Porou East Coast	Hurricanes	Kahu Tamatea	Ruatoria
North Otago	Highlanders	Jason Forrest	Oamaru
Poverty Bay	Hurricanes	Miah Nikora	Gisborne
South Canterbury	Crusaders	Nigel Walsh	Timaru
Thames Valley	Chiefs	David Harrison & Joe Murray	Paeroa
Wairarapa Bush	Hurricanes	Reece Robinson	Masterton
West Coast	Crusaders	Sean Cuttance	Greymouth
Whanganui	Hurricanes	Jason Hamlin	Whanganui

== Regular season standings ==
In the regular season, South Canterbury topped the standings with 40 points after winning all eight games.

Pos.	Team	Pld	W	D	L	PF	PA	PD	TB	LB	Pts
1	South Canterbury	8	8	0	0	341	180	+161	8	0	40
2	Whanganui	8	6	0	2	264	156	+108	6	2	32
3	Thames Valley	8	6	0	2	246	220	+26	5	2	31
4	Ngati Porou East Coast	8	5	0	3	222	183	+39	5	2	27
5	North Otago	8	4	0	4	259	228	+31	5	1	22
6	Wairarapa Bush	8	4	0	4	190	246	−56	4	2	22
7	West Coast	8	4	0	4	218	212	6	5	0	21
8	Poverty Bay	8	2	0	6	229	249	−20	4	4	16
9	Mid Canterbury	8	2	0	6	221	245	−24	5	3	16
10	King Country	8	3	0	5	175	248	−73	3	1	16
11	Buller	8	2	0	6	165	242	−77	5	2	15
12	Horowhenua-Kapiti	8	2	0	6	176	297	−121	2	1	11

Meads Cup qualification
Lochore Cup qualification

During the regular season two games were decided by golden point. The final results in these games (after extra time) were East Coast 24, Buller 21 in Round 4 and West Coast 32, Mid Canterbury 29 in Round 6.

Siu Kakala the Number 8 forward from South Canterbury became the 4th Heartland Championship player to score a try in all 8 regular season games. He also scored a try in the semi-finals. He was named the 2023 Heartland Championship Player of the Year.

== Finals ==
In the Meads Cup the top placegetter plays at their home ground against the fourth team while the second placed team plays at home against the third. In the Lochore Cup the fifth placegetter plays at their home ground against the eighth team while the sixth placed team plays at home against the seventh. The winning semi-finalists then meet in the respective finals for each Cup, played at the home-ground of the team ranked highest in the regular season.

=== Meads Cup ===
In the 2023 season South Canterbury once again went unbeaten through the regular season, albeit that they scored 341 points, significantly lower than the previous season's record of 491.

South Canterbury went on to win their semi-final 34–17 over Ngati Porou East Coast. As in the 2022 season they met Whanganui in the final and won by 40–30.

It was the 3rd Meads Cup in a row for South Canterbury, equaling the feat of Whanganui who won in the 2015, 2016 and 2017 seasons. South Canterbury set a record with 31 consecutive wins.

Meads Cup semi-finals
2	Whanganui	38
3	Thames Valley	3
1	South Canterbury	34
4	Ngati Porou East Coast	17

Meads Cup final
1	South Canterbury	40
2	Whanganui	30

=== Lochore Cup ===
As in the 2022 season, North Otago finished the regular season 5th and therefore top qualifier for the Lochore Cup. However they lost their home semi-final to 8th placed Poverty Bay by 35–40. In the other semi-final Wairarapa Bush the 6th placegetter in the regular season were also upset, losing to 7th placed West Coast by 27–33 at Masterton.

West Coast then beat Poverty Bay by 23–20 in the final. It was the first Lochore Cup title for West Coast who had previously suffered three Lochore Cup final defeats.

Lochore Cup semi-finals
1	North Otago	35
4	Poverty Bay	40
2	Wairarapa Bush	27
3	West Coast	33

Lochore Cup final
1	West Coast	23
2	Poverty Bay	20

== Bill Osborne Taonga ==
Since 2022 Heartland teams have played for this challenge trophy, named after 16-test All Black Bill Osborne and based on similar rules to the Ranfurly Shield played for by National Provincial Championship teams. Ngati Porou East Coast had four successful defences of the Bill Osborne Taonga:

- August 19 - Ngati Porou East Coast 19 Mid Canterbury 8
- August 26 - Ngati Porou East Coast 38 North Otago 29
- September 9 - Ngati Porou East Coast 31 Poverty Bay 11
- September 23 - Ngati Porou East Coast 29 King Country 11

== Ian Kirkpatrick Medal ==
Since 2022, the Heartland Championship Player of the Year award has been awarded a medal named after former All Blacks captain Ian Kirkpatrick. The 2023 winner was Siu Kakala (South Canterbury). Other finalists were Stuart Leach (Poverty Bay) and Alekesio Vakarorogo (Whanganui).

== See also ==
- Hanan Shield competed for by Mid Canterbury, North Otago and South Canterbury
- Rundle Cup played between Buller and West Coast
- New Zealand Heartland XV
- Ranfurly Shield 2020–2029
- 2023 Bunnings NPC
