= 2009 Heartland Championship =

Amateur rugby union competition in New Zealand

- Date: 29 August 2009–31 October 2009
- Countries: New Zealand

Final positions
- Champions: Wanganui (Meads Cup); North Otago (Lochore Cup)
- Runner-up: Mid Canterbury (Meads Cup); West Coast (Lochore Cup)

The 2009 Heartland Championship was the fourth Heartland Championship, a provincial rugby union competition in New Zealand involving the country's 12 amateur rugby unions, since it was reorganised in 2006. The round-robin ran from 29 August to 17 October with 30 games in round one and 18 games in round two for a total of 48 games being played through the round-robin, after which the teams went into the playoffs. In the playoffs, the top four teams from each pool in round two went on to semifinals, and then a grand final for each pool was played on 31 October.

Wanganui won their second consecutive Meads Cup, each coming by defeating Mid Canterbury in the final. Wanganui was a Meads Cup finalist in each of the first four years of the Heartland Championship. North Otago defeated West Coast in the Lochore Cup final. North Otago became the first team to win both the Meads Cup (2007) and the Lochore Cup. This was West Coast's first finals appearance in any provincial championship.

== Pool stage ==
The pool stage ran for eight weeks from 29 August to 17 October. Teams were assigned to one of two pools, based on their performance in the 2008 season. The pool stage was split into two rounds; round 1 ran for five weeks with each team playing five games, while round 2 ran for three weeks. The top three teams from each pool qualified for the Meads Cup pool and the bottom three teams from each pool qualified for the Lochore Cup pool. Teams faced the three other teams that they did not play in round 1. Competition points were carried over from round 1 to round 2.

=== Round 1 ===
==== Pool A ====
Qualified for Meads Cup
Qualified for Lochore Cup

Pos	Team	Pld	W	D	L	PF	PA	PD	BP1	BP2	Pts
1	Wanganui	5	4	0	1	146	71	+75	3	1	20
2	Horowhenua-Kapiti	5	4	0	1	135	74	+61	2	0	18
3	Wairarapa Bush	5	3	0	2	104	66	+38	0	2	14
4	West Coast	5	3	0	2	91	117	−26	0	0	12
5	Buller	5	1	0	4	100	93	+7	1	3	8
6	East Coast	5	0	0	5	49	204	−155	0	0	0

==== Pool B ====
Pos	Team	Pld	W	D	L	PF	PA	PD	BP1	BP2	Pts
1	Poverty Bay	5	4	0	1	111	87	+24	1	1	18
2	Mid Canterbury	5	4	0	1	115	94	+21	0	1	17
3	South Canterbury	5	3	0	2	88	93	−5	0	1	13
4	North Otago	5	2	0	3	143	87	+56	2	1	11
5	King Country	5	2	0	3	100	111	−11	1	1	9
6	Thames Valley	5	0	0	5	80	165	−85	0	3	3

==== Fixtures ====
There will be a total of 48 matches throughout the pool stage in the 2009 Heartland Championship, 30 in Round 1 and 18 in Round 2.

===== Round 1 =====
Pool	Home	Score	Away	Match information
Pool	Home	Score	Away	Date and time	Venue
A	West Coast	13–10	Wairarapa Bush	29 August 2009, 2:35 p.m.	Greymouth
A	Buller	13–17	Horowhenua-Kapiti	29 August 2009, 2:35 p.m.	Westport
A	Wanganui	46–6	East Coast	29 August 2009, 2:35 p.m.	Wanganui
B	Mid Canterbury	26–24	Thames Valley	29 August 2009, 2:35 p.m.	Ashburton
B	King Country	20–26	Poverty Bay	29 August 2009, 2:35 p.m.	Taupō
B	North Otago	22–26	South Canterbury	29 August 2009, 2:35 p.m.	Oamaru

===== Round 2 =====
Pool	Home	Score	Away	Match information
Pool	Home	Score	Away	Date and time	Venue
A	Wairarapa Bush	21–17	Wanganui	5 September 2009, 2:35 p.m.	Masterton
A	Horowhenua-Kapiti	33–9	West Coast	5 September 2009, 2:35 p.m.	Levin
A	Buller	47–9	East Coast	5 September 2009, 2:35 p.m.	Westport
B	South Canterbury	13–16	Mid Canterbury	5 September 2009, 2:35 p.m.	Timaru
B	King Country	35–13	Thames Valley	5 September 2009, 2:35 p.m.	Te Kūiti
B	Poverty Bay	18–10	North Otago	5 September 2009, 2:35 p.m.	Gisborne

===== Round 3 =====
Pool	Home	Score	Away	Match information
Pool	Home	Score	Away	Date and time	Venue
A	West Coast	26–20	Buller	12 September 2009, 2:35 p.m.	Greymouth
A	East Coast	10–33	Wairarapa Bush	12 September 2009, 2:35 p.m.	Ruatoria
A	Wanganui	37–28	Horowhenua-Kapiti	12 September 2009, 2:35 p.m.	Wanganui
B	Thames Valley	18–20	South Canterbury	12 September 2009, 2:35 p.m.	Paeroa
B	North Otago	35–10	King Country	12 September 2009, 2:35 p.m.	Oamaru
B	Mid Canterbury	19–24	Poverty Bay	12 September 2009, 2:35 p.m.	Ashburton

===== Round 4 =====
Pool	Home	Score	Away	Match information
Pool	Home	Score	Away	Date and time	Venue
A	Buller	7-13	Wanganui	19 September 2009, 2:35 p.m.	Westport
A	Horowhenua-Kapiti	13-12	Wairarapa Bush	19 September 2009, 2:35 p.m.	Levin
A	West Coast	34-21	East Coast	19 September 2009, 2:35 p.m.	Greymouth
B	King Country	12-24	Mid Canterbury	19 September 2009, 2:35 p.m.	Te Kūiti
B	Poverty Bay	14-16	South Canterbury	19 September 2009, 2:35 p.m.	Gisborne
B	North Otago	55-3	Thames Valley	19 September 2009, 2:35 p.m.	Oamaru

===== Round 5 =====
Pool	Home	Score	Away	Match information
Pool	Home	Score	Away	Date and time	Venue
A	Wairarapa Bush	28–13	Buller	26 September 2009, 2:35 p.m.	Masterton
A	Wanganui	33–9	West Coast	26 September 2009, 2:35 p.m.	Wanganui
A	East Coast	3–44	Horowhenua-Kapiti	26 September 2009, 2:35 p.m.	Ruatoria
B	Thames Valley	22–27	Poverty Bay	26 September 2009, 2:35 p.m.	Paeroa
B	South Canterbury	13–23	King Country	26 September 2009, 2:35 p.m.	Timaru
B	Mid Canterbury	30–21	North Otago	26 September 2009, 2:35 p.m.	Ashburton

=== Round two ===
With the teams split into their respective cup pools, the teams faced each opponent that they did not play in Round One, with the top four teams moving on to the semifinals of their respective groups.

==== Lochore Cup Pool ====
Qualified for semifinals

Pos	Team	Pld	W	D	L	PF	PA	PD	BP1	BP2	Pts
1	West Coast	8	5	0	3	166	159	+7	1	0	21
2	North Otago	8	4	0	4	252	144	+108	3	1	20
3	King Country	8	4	0	4	199	158	+41	2	2	20
4	Buller	8	3	0	5	163	156	+7	2	3	17
5	East Coast	8	1	0	7	87	337	−250	0	0	4
6	Thames Valley	8	0	0	8	110	237	−127	0	4	4

- North Otago ranked ahead of King Country and East Coast ranked ahead of Thames Valley based on head-to-head results.

==== Meads Cup Pool ====
Pos	Team	Pld	W	D	L	PF	PA	PD	BP1	BP2	Pts
1	Mid Canterbury	8	7	0	1	196	133	+63	1	1	30
2	Wanganui	8	6	0	2	275	108	+167	5	1	30
3	Poverty Bay	8	6	0	2	154	181	−27	1	1	26
4	South Canterbury	8	5	0	3	169	198	−29	1	1	22
5	Horowhenua-Kapiti	8	4	0	4	193	166	+27	2	1	19
6	Wairarapa Bush	8	3	0	5	155	142	+13	1	4	17

- Mid Canterbury ranked ahead of Wanganui based on head-to-head results.

==== Fixtures ====
===== Round 6 =====
Pool	Home	Score	Away	Match information
Pool	Home	Score	Away	Date and time	Venue
L	West Coast	27–3	Thames Valley	3 October 2009, 2:35 p.m.	Greymouth
L	North Otago	63–8	East Coast	3 October 2009, 2:35 p.m.	Oamaru
L	King Country	17–20	Buller	3 October 2009, 2:35 p.m.	Te Kūiti
M	Horowhenua-Kapiti	19–34	Mid Canterbury	3 October 2009, 2:35 p.m.	Levin
M	Wanganui	59–14	South Canterbury	3 October 2009, 2:35 p.m.	Wanganui
M	Poverty Bay	18–17	Wairarapa Bush	3 October 2009, 2:35 p.m.	Gisborne

===== Round 7 =====
Pool	Home	Score	Away	Match information
Pool	Home	Score	Away	Date and time	Venue
L	Thames Valley	10–16	East Coast	10 October 2009, 2:35 p.m.	Te Aroha
L	North Otago	29–14	Buller	10 October 2009, 2:35 p.m.	Oamaru
L	King Country	22–13	West Coast	10 October 2009, 2:35 p.m.	Taupō
M	Poverty Bay	25–21	Horowhenua-Kapiti	10 October 2009, 2:35 p.m.	Gisborne
M	Mid Canterbury	23–14	Wanganui	10 October 2009, 2:35 p.m.	Ashburton
M	South Canterbury	34–28	Wairarapa Bush	10 October 2009, 2:35 p.m.	Gisborne

===== Round 8 =====
Pool	Home	Score	Away	Match information
Pool	Home	Score	Away	Date and time	Venue
L	East Coast	14–60	King Country	17 October 2009, 2:35 p.m.	Ruatoria
L	Buller	29–17	Thames Valley	17 October 2009, 2:35 p.m.	Westport
L	West Coast	35–17	North Otago	17 October 2009, 2:35 p.m.	Greymouth
M	Wanganui	56–0	Poverty Bay	17 October 2009, 2:35 p.m.	Wanganui
M	Wairarapa Bush	6–24	Mid Canterbury	17 October 2009, 2:35 p.m.	Masterton
M	Horowhenua-Kapiti	18–33	South Canterbury	17 October 2009, 2:35 p.m.	Levin

== Knockout stage ==
=== Lochore Cup ===
Semi-finals
24 October – Greymouth
West Coast	53
Buller	22
24 October – Oamaru
North Otago	31
King Country	27

Final
31 October – Greymouth
West Coast	13
North Otago	21

==== Semifinals ====
Home	Score	Away	Match information
Home	Score	Away	Date	Venue
West Coast	53–22	Buller	24 October 2009	Greymouth
North Otago	31–27	King Country	24 October 2009	Oamaru

==== Final ====
Home	Score	Away	Match information
Home	Score	Away	Date	Venue
West Coast	13–21	North Otago	31 October 2009	Greymouth

=== Meads Cup ===
Semi-finals
24 October – Ashburton
Mid Canterbury	19
South Canterbury	17
24 October – Wanganui
Wanganui	48
Poverty Bay	13

Final
31 October – Christchurch
Mid Canterbury	13
Wanganui	34

==== Semifinals ====
Home	Score	Away	Match information
Home	Score	Away	Date	Venue
Mid Canterbury	19–17	South Canterbury	24 October 2008	Ashburton
Wanganui	48–13	Poverty Bay	24 October 2008	Wanganui

==== Final ====
Home	Score	Away	Match information
Home	Score	Away	Date	Venue
Mid Canterbury	13–34	Wanganui	31 October 2009	Christchurch

== Statistics ==
As of week 6 of the season, there were 1,559 points scored over 36 games, including 167 tries, with an average of 43.3 points per game.

North Otago has scored the most points this season with 206 points, and along with Wanganui, they have also scored the most tries with 29 each. Wairarapa Bush have given up the fewest points so far with 84.

2009 Heartland Championship statistics
Overall	Team
Points scored	1,559	Most points for	North Otago (206)
Average	43.3 per game	Fewest points against	Wairarapa Bush (84)
Tries scored	167	Most tries	Wanganui (29); North Otago (29)

=== Points ===
The table showing how many points scored by each team (white) and how many points each team was scored against them (grey) in the 2009 Heartland Championship. North Otago have currently scored the most points with 206, while Wairarapa Bush have given up the fewest points with 84.

Team	Points by round														Total		Avg	
Team	1		2		3		4		5		6		7	8	Total		Avg	
Buller	13	17	47	9	20	26	7	13	13	28	20	17	—	—	120	110	20	18.3
East Coast	6	46	9	47	10	33	21	34	3	44	8	63	—	—	57	267	9.5	44.5
Horowhenua-Kapiti	17	13	33	9	28	37	13	12	44	3	19	34	—	—	154	108	25.7	18
King Country	20	26	35	13	10	35	12	24	23	13	17	20	—	—	117	131	19.5	21.8
Mid Canterbury	26	24	16	13	19	24	24	12	30	21	34	19	—	—	149	113	24.8	18.8
North Otago	22	26	10	18	35	10	55	3	21	30	63	8	—	—	206	95	34.3	15.8
Poverty Bay	26	20	18	10	24	19	14	16	27	22	18	17	—	—	127	104	21.2	17.3
South Canterbury	26	22	13	16	20	18	16	14	13	23	14	59	—	—	102	152	17	25.3
Thames Valley	24	26	13	35	18	20	3	55	22	27	3	27	—	—	83	190	13.8	31.7
Wairarapa Bush	10	13	21	17	33	10	12	13	28	13	17	18	—	—	121	84	20.2	14
Wanganui	46	6	17	21	37	28	13	7	33	9	59	14	—	—	205	85	34.2	14.2
West Coast	13	10	9	33	26	20	34	21	9	33	27	3	—	—	118	120	19.7	20
	249		241		280		224		266		299		—	—	1559		43.3	

Overall
Overall	For	Against

=== Tries ===
Wanganui and North Otago have scored the most tries this season with 29, while East Coast and Thames Valley have scored the fewest tries with four each.

Team	Total	Tries by round							
Team	Total	1	2	3	4	5	6	7	8
Buller	14	2	7	1	1	1	2	—	—
East Coast	4	0	0	1	2	0	1	—	—
Horowhenua-Kapiti	18	3	4	1	1	6	3	—	—
King Country	12	2	4	1	0	3	2	—	—
Mid Canterbury	16	2	1	3	3	3	4	—	—
North Otago	29	3	1	4	8	2	11	—	—
Poverty Bay	13	2	2	2	1	4	2	—	—
South Canterbury	9	2	1	2	1	1	2	—	—
Thames Valley	4	0	1	2	0	1	0	—	—
Wairarapa Bush	10	1	2	3	0	3	1	—	—
Wanganui	29	8	2	5	1	4	9	—	—
West Coast	9	1	0	2	3	0	3	—	—
	167	26	25	27	21	28	40	—	—

Team and round total
Overall total

== See also ==
- Hanan Shield competed for by Mid Canterbury, North Otago and South Canterbury
- Rundle Cup played between Buller and West Coast
- New Zealand Heartland XV
- Ranfurly Shield 2000–2009
- 2009 Air New Zealand Cup
