= 2011 Heartland Championship =

- Date: 6 August 2011–8 October 2011
- Countries: New Zealand

Final positions
- Champions: Wanganui (Meads Cup); Poverty Bay (Lochore Cup)
- Runner-up: East Coast (Meads Cup); South Canterbury (Lochore Cup)

Tournament statistics
- Matches played: 48

The 2011 Heartland Championship was the sixth edition of the Heartland Championship, New Zealand's provincial rugby union competition, since it was reorganised in 2006. The teams represented the 12 amateur rugby unions.

For 2011, the competition did away with the two-round system of previous years. The tournament's round robin stage saw the 12 teams play 8 games. The top four teams in the table at the end of the 8 weeks played off for the Meads Cup while the next four teams contested the Lochore Cup.

The winner of the Meads Cup received automatic promotion to the Championship, replacing the seventh-placed team in the Championship, which was relegated to the Heartland Championship.

== Teams ==
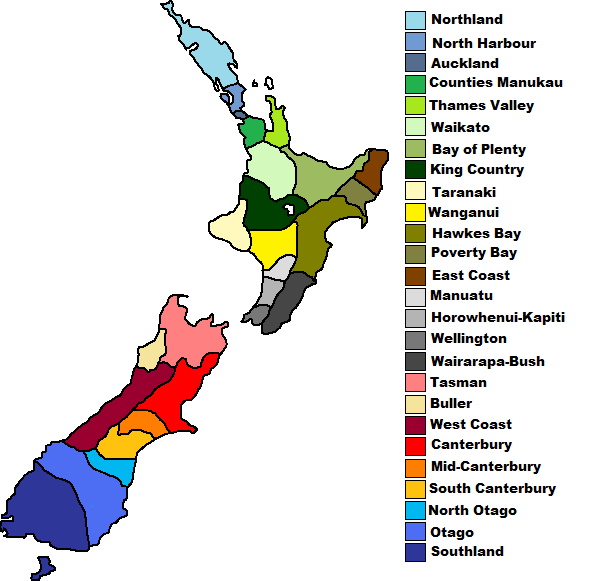
A map of NZRU provincial boundaries, including provinces competing in both the ITM Cup and Heartland Championship

The 2011 Heartland Championship is being contested by the following teams:

Province	Super Rugby partner	Hometown
Buller	Crusaders	Westport
East Coast	Hurricanes	Ruatoria
Horowhenua-Kapiti	Hurricanes	Levin
King Country	Chiefs	Te Kūiti, Taupō
Mid Canterbury	Crusaders	Ashburton
North Otago	Highlanders	Oamaru
Poverty Bay	Hurricanes	Gisborne
South Canterbury	Crusaders	Timaru
Thames Valley	Chiefs	Paeroa
Wairarapa Bush	Hurricanes	Masterton
Wanganui	Hurricanes	Wanganui
West Coast	Crusaders	Greymouth

== Table ==
Qualified for Meads Cup
Qualified for Lochore Cup

Pos	Team	Pld	W	D	L	PF	PA	PD	BP	Pts
1	Wanganui	8	7	0	1	364	117	+247	7	35
2	North Otago	8	7	1	0	265	149	+115	5	35
3	East Coast	8	6	0	2	189	198	−9	3	27
4	Mid Canterbury	8	5	0	3	180	143	+37	6	26
5	Buller	8	5	0	3	188	131	+57	6	26
6	South Canterbury	8	4	0	4	239	187	+52	6	22
7	Thames Valley	8	4	1	3	229	181	+48	3	21
8	Poverty Bay	8	3	1	4	184	226	−42	5	19
9	West Coast	8	2	1	5	144	216	−72	3	13
10	Wairarapa Bush	8	1	0	7	156	231	−75	4	8
11	King Country	8	1	0	7	150	281	−131	1	5
12	Horowhenua-Kapiti	8	1	0	7	98	326	−228	1	5

== Results ==
=== Week 1 ===
6 August
14:30

Buller	18–14	Poverty Bay
Try: Luke Brownlie, Pene Naibanavalu; Con: Tema Faifua; Pen: Andrew Stephens	Report

Victoria Square, Westport

6 August
14:30

East Coast	15–13	Mid Canterbury
	Report	Try: Richard Catherwood, Adam Ross; Pen: Peter McAndrew

Whakarua Park, Ruatoria

6 August
14:30

Wairarapa Bush	26–53	Thames Valley
Try: Trent Vatselias (2), Tommy Harmon, James Goodger; Con: Tipene Haira (3)	Report

Trust House Memorial Park, Masterton

6 August
14:30

Wanganui	50–19	King Country
Try: Simon Dibben (2), Sam Scown (2), Cole Baldwin, Ace Malo, Shaun McDonough; Con: Mark Davis (6); Pen: Mark Davis	Report	Try: James Hemara, Mack Lynn, Josh Standen; Con: Sean Cressy (2)

Spriggens Park, Wanganui

6 August
14:30

Horowhenua-Kapiti	24–20	South Canterbury
Try: Rahiri Connor-Johnson (2), Michael Papps, Marcus Sweetman; Con: Tiakina Manga (2)	Report

Horowhenua Community Trust Levin Domain, Levin

7 August
14:05

North Otago	29–19	West Coast
Try: Whiria Meltzer (3), Hamish McKenzie, Luke Herden; Con: Ben Patston, Billy Guyton	Report	Try: Rowan O'Gorman, Luke Hughes; Con: Shannon Donald

Forsyth Barr Stadium, Dunedin

=== Week 2 ===
13 August
14:30

King Country	20–34	Buller
Try: Luke Draper, Sam Holder, Rupeni Seduadua; Con: Sean Cressy; Pen: Sean Cressy	Report	Try: Craig Adams (2), Peni Naibanavalu, William Sakuru; Con: Andrew Stephens (4); Pen: Andrew Stephens (2)

Rugby Park, Te Kūiti

13 August
14:30

West Coast	15–20	East Coast
Try: Lance McEwen, Luke Hughes; Con: Shannon Donald; Pen: Shannon Donald	Report	Try: Sikeli Vorenasu, Charlie Harrison; Con: Sikeli Vorenasu; Pen: Sikeli Vorenasu; Drop: Sikeli Vorenasu

Rugby Park, Greymouth

13 August
14:30

Poverty Bay	30–30	North Otago
Try: John Stewart (3), Lloyd Gabriel; Con: Kahu Tamatea (2); Pen: Kahu Tamatea (2)	Report	Try: Billy Guyton, Ralph Darling, Will Hurst, Whiria Meltzer; Con: Jason Forrest (2); Pen: Jason Forrest (2)

The Oval, Gisborne

13 August
14:30

Mid Canterbury	16–12	Wairarapa Bush
Try: Jason Rickard, Pete McAndrew; Pen: Stefan van Gruting (2)	Report	Pen: Trent Vatselias (4)

Methven Domain, Methven

13 August
14:00

Thames Valley	36–5	Horowhenua-Kapiti
Try: Aaron McDonald, Jackson Achilles, Johan Bardoul, Lance Easton; Con: Joe Reynolds (2); Pen: Joe Reynolds (4)	Report	Try: Anthony Porima

Paeroa Domain, Paeroa

13 August
14:30

South Canterbury	18–28	Wanganui
Try: Jared Trevathan, Junior Sala; Con: Scott Norton; Pen: Scott Norton (2)	Report	Try: Andrew Retallick, Simon Dibben, Rusiate Vukula; Con: Mark Davis (2); Pen: Mark Davis (3)

Fraser Park, Timaru

=== Week 3 ===
20 August
14:30

Poverty Bay	8–6	Mid Canterbury
Try: Apisalome Ratuniyarawa; Pen: Kahu Tamatea		Pen: Stefan Van Gruting (2)

The Oval, Gisborne

20 August
14:30

Wairarapa Bush	11–26	Buller
Try: James Goodger; Pen: Trent Vatselia, Tipene Haira		Try: William Saukuru, Pene Naivanaivalu (2), Tema Faifua; Con: Andrew Stephens, Phil Gibson (2)

Trust House Memorial Park, Masterton

20 August
14:30

West Coast	22–3	Horowhenua-Kapiti
Try: Rowan O'Gorman, Jason Wright; Pen: Sean Donald (4)		Pen: Tiakina Manga

Rugby Park, Greymouth

20 August
14:30

North Otago	52–17	East Coast
Try: Lemi Masoe (2), Faaitu Tuamoheloa (2), Tevita Fifita (2), Whiria Meltzer (2); Con: Ben Paterson (6)		Try: Ricky Waitoa, Sikeli Vorenasu, Rocky Monika; Con: Sikeli Vorenasu

Whitestone Contracting Stadium, Oamaru

20 August
14:30

King Country	17–45	South Canterbury
Try: Hayden Braid, Anthony Kiff; Con: Sean Cressy (2); Pen: Sean Cressy		Try: Sekope Maea, Jarred Trevathan, Eric Smith, Kail Latu, Maile Iongi; Con: Scott Norton (4); Pen: Scott Norton (4)

Owen Delany Park, Taupo

20 August
14:00

Thames Valley	21–31	Wanganui
Try: Jimmy Horsford, Jackson Achilles; Con: Joe Reynolds; Pen: Joe Reynolds (3)		Try: Sam Scown (2), Tevita Taufui; Con: Mark Davis (2); Pen: Mark Davis (4)

Paeroa Domain, Paeroa

=== Week 4 ===
27 August
14:30

Wanganui	23–26	Mid Canterbury
Try: Simon Dibben, Paul Fitzgerald, Sam Scown, Tevita Tafui; Pen: Mark Davis		Try: Sefo Makaui (2), James Kora, Dwayne Burrows; Con: James Lash (3)

Spriggens Park, Wanganui

27 August
14:30

South Canterbury	42–31	Poverty Bay
Try: Kurt Rooney, Sam Beard, Jarred Trevathan, Sekope Maea (2); Con: Scott Norton (4); Pen: Scott Norton (3)		Try: John Stewart (2), BJ Sidney, Paulo Tikomainaivalu (2); Con: Scott Leighton (3)

Fraser Park, Timaru
Attendance: 500

27 August
14:30

Horowhenua-Kapiti	17–29	King Country
Try: Marcus Sweetman; Pen: Vili Tia (4)		Try: Dean Church (3), Sam Mason, Hayden Baird; Con: Sean Cressy (2)

Horowhenua Community Trust Levin Domain, Levin

27 August
14:30

North Otago	41–26	Wairarapa Bush
Try: Hamish McKenzie, Will Hurst (2), Whiria Meltzer, Luke Herden; Con: Ben Patston (5); Pen: Ben Patston (2)		Try: Nick Olson, Trent Vetselias; Con: Trent Vetselias (2); Pen: Trent Vetselias (4)

Whitestone Contracting Stadium, Oamaru

27 August
14:30

Buller	34–8	East Coast
Try: Phil Gibson, Phil Rossiter, William Saukuru, Pene Nabainivalu, Sam Marris; Con: Andrew Stephens (3); Pen: Andrew Stephens		Try: Thomas Kahukiwa; Pen: Brad Turei

Victoria Square, Westport

27 August
14:30

West Coast	17–17	Thames Valley
Try: Scott McAuley, Alan Monk, Maleli Mudu; Con: Shannon Donald		Try: Lance Easton, Joe Reynolds; Con: Joe Reynolds (2); Pen: Joe Reynolds

Rugby Park, Greymouth

=== Week 5 ===
3 September
14:30

Poverty Bay	13–58	Wanganui
Try: John Stewart; Con: Scott Leighton; Pen: Scott Leighton (2)		Try: Steelie Koro, Tevita Tafui (2), Ace Malo (2), Rusiate Vukula, Jason Hughes; Con: Ace Malo (3), Mark Davis (3); Pen: Mark Davis (2)

Patutahi Domain, Gisborne

3 September
14:30

Mid Canterbury	37–12	King Country
Try: Sefo Makaui, Dwayne Burrows, Ben Kitching, James Lash, Mac Sykes; Con: James Lash (3); Pen: James Lash (2)		Try: James Hemara, Charles Hubbard; Con: Sean Cressy

Methven Domain, Methven

3 September
14:30

Horowhenua-Kapiti`	15–61	North Otago
Try: Tiakina Manga (2); Con: Vili Tia; Pen: Vili Tia		Try: Eric Duff, Ben Patston, Luke Herden, Chris Talanoa, Tevita Tafui (2), Carn Parata, Lemi Masoe, Billy Guyton; Con: Ben Patston (8)

Horowhenua Community Trust Levin Domain, Levin

3 September
14:30

East Coast	33–13	Wairarapa Bush
		Try: Inia Katea; Con: Trent Vatselias; Pen: Trent Vatselias (2)

Whakarua Park, Ruatoria

3 September
14:30

South Canterbury	39–8	West Coast
Try: Tevita Latu, Sam Baird, Scott Norton, Eric Smith; Con: Scott Norton (2); Pen: Scott Norton (5)		Try: Christian Tupuola; Pen: Luke Hughes

Fraser Park, Timaru

3 September
14:00

Thames Valley	22–20	Buller
Try: Jimmy Horsford, Lance Easton; Con: David Harrison (2); Pen: David Harrison		Try: Sam Marris, Lee Nelmes; Con: Andrew Stephens (2); Pen: Andrew Stephens (2)

Paeroa Domain, Paeroa

=== Week 6 ===
10 September
14:30

Wanganui	76–8	Horowhenua-Kapiti
Try: Sam Scown (3), Simon Dibben, Vaan Rauhina, Tom Gilbert, Andrew Evans, Andrew Retallick, Sam Brown, Daniel Fitzgerald, Ace Malo, Jon Smyth; Con: Ace Malo (8)		Try: Marcus Sweetman; Pen: Tiakina Manga

Cooks Gardens, Wanganui

10 September
14:30

Mid Canterbury	34–22	South Canterbury
Try: Ben Kitching (2), Richie Catherwood, Mac Sykes, Shane Kora; Con: James Lash (2), John Dampney; Drop: James Lash		Try: Kali Latu, Sekope Maea; Pen: Scott Norton (4)

Ashburton Showgrounds, Ashburton

10 September
13:00

Buller	8–11	North Otago
Try: William Sakuru, Phil Gibson		Try: Hamish McKenzie; Pen: Ben Patston; Drop: Ben Patston

Victoria Square, Westport

10 September
13:00

East Coast	31–26	Thames Valley
Try: Rua Tipoki, Sikeli Vorenasu (2); Con: Clayton Kiwara (2); Pen: Clayton Kiwara (4)		Try: Jimmy Horsford; Pen: Joe Reynolds (7)

Whakarua Park, Ruatoria

10 September
14:30

Wairarapa Bush	21–23	Poverty Bay
Try: Nick Olson, Jake Tipene; Con: Trent Vatselias; Pen: Trent Vatselias (3)		Try: Lloyd Gabriel, Ratu Vosaki; Con: Scott Leighton (2); Pen: Scott Leighton (3)

Carterton Rugby Club, Carterton

10 September
13:00

King Country	18–36	West Coast
Try: Dean Church, Tom Sherson; Con: Sean Cressy; Pen: Sean Cressy (2)		Try: Robert Gabriel, Napole Langi, Mosese Funaki, Maleli Mudu, James Ward; Con: Shannon Donald (3), Luke Hughes; Pen: Luke Hughes

Rugby Park, Te Kūiti

=== Week 7 ===
17 September
13:00

West Coast	12–69	Wanganui

Rugby Park, Greymouth

17 September
13:00

Mid Canterbury	30–27	Buller

Ashburton Showgrounds, Ashburton

17 September
14:30

South Canterbury	16–17	North Otago

Fraser Park, Timaru

17 September
13:00

King Country	14–26	Thames Valley

Owen Delany Park, Taupo

17 September
13:00

East Coast	30–29	Poverty Bay

Uawa Domain, Tolaga Bay

17 September
14:30

Wairarapa Bush	47–10	Horowhenua-Kapiti

Carterton Rugby Club, Carterton

=== Week 8 ===
24 September
13:00

Buller	21–15	West Coast
Try: Shane Grieve, Phil Beveridge; Con: Andrew Stephens; Pen: Andrew Stephens (2), Phil Gibson		Try: James Ward, Garry Little; Con: Corey Deans; Pen: Corey Deans

Victoria Square, Westport

24 September
13:30

North Otago	24–18	Mid Canterbury
Try: Whiria Meltzer, Carn Parata, Luke Hernden; Con: Jason Forrest, Ben Patston (2); Pen: Jason Forrest		Try: Nick Wilson, Manase Nonu; Con: Stephan van Gruting; Pen: Stephan van Gruting (2)

Whitestone Contracting Stadium, Oamaru

24 September
13:00

Thames Valley	28–37	South Canterbury
Try: Penalty try, Vin Hutchings, Caleb Brown, Alan McLean; Con: Joe Reynolds (2); Pen: Joe Reynolds (2); Drop: Joe Reynolds		Try: Foi Saena, Jarred Trevathan, Kali Latu, Matt Fetu; Con: Scott Norton (3); Pen: Scott Norton (2)

Paeroa Domain, Paeroa

24 September
13:00

Poverty Bay	36–21	King Country
Try: Paul Tikomainivalu (3), Kelvin Smith, John Stewart; Con: Scott Leighton (4); Pen: Scott Leighton		Try: Leigh Thompson, Dean Church, Charles Hubbard; Con: Sean Cressy (3)

More FM Rugby Park, Gisborne

24 September
14:30

Wanganui	29–0	Wairarapa Bush
Try: Cole Baldwin, Mark Davis, Darren Munro, Rusiate Vukula; Con: Mark Davis (3); Pen: Mark Davis		Try: Andrew McLean, Matt O'Connor; Con: Trent Vatselias (2)

Cooks Gardens, Wanganui

24 September
16:00

Horowhenua-Kapiti	16–35	East Coast

Otaki Domain, Otaki

== Finals ==
=== Lochore Cup ===
Semi-finals

1 October
13:00

Buller	30–32	Poverty Bay
Try: Ben Coman, Will Sakuru, Phil Gibson, Bevan Tetai; Con: Andrew Stephens (2); Pen: Andrew Stephens (2)		Try: John Stewart (2), Kelvin Smith, Ratu Vosaki; Con: Scott Leighton (3); Pen: Scott Leighton (2)

Victoria Square, Westport

1 October
13:00

South Canterbury	30–27	Thames Valley
Try: Kali Latu, Jarred Matthews, Andrew Scarlett, Shannon McRae; Con: Scott Norton (2); Pen: Scott Norton (2)		Try: Joe Reynolds (2), Lance Easton, Mike Smith; Con: Joe Reynolds, David Harrison; Pen: Joe Reynolds

Fraser Park, Timaru

Final

8 October
15:05

South Canterbury	22–49	Poverty Bay
Try: Eric Smith, Junior Sala, Sam Baird; Con: Scott Norton (2); Pen: Scott Norton		Try: Sam Stewart, Daniel Harris, Sione Ngatu, Kelvin Smith, Ratu Vosake, Murray Hewson; Con: Scott Leighton (5); Pen: Scott Leighton (3)

Fraser Park, Timaru

=== Meads Cup ===
Semi-finals

1 October
13:00

Wanganui	32–22	Mid Canterbury
Try: Tevita Tafui, Jason Hughes, Rusiate Vukula, Denning Tyrell; Con: Mark Davis (3); Pen: Mark Davis (2)		Try: Nick Wilson (2), Josh Colgan; Con: Stephan van Gruting (2); Pen: Stephan van Gruting

Cooks Gardens, Wanganui

1 October
13:00

North Otago	17–23	East Coast
Try: Faaitu Tuamoheloa, Whiria Meltzer; Con: Ben Patston (2); Pen: Ben Patston		Try: Sikeli Vorenasu (2), Ngarimu Simpkins; Con: Clayton Kiwara; Pen: Clayton Kiwara (2)

Whitestone Contracting Stadium, Oamaru

Final

8 October
12:35

Wanganui	30–10	East Coast
Try: Simon Dibben, Steelie Koro; Con: Mark Davis; Pen: Mark Davis (6)		Try: Tom Teaeki; Con: Clayton Kiwara; Pen: Clayton Kiwara

Cooks Gardens, Wanganui

== See also ==
- Hanan Shield competed for by Mid Canterbury, North Otago and South Canterbury
- Rundle Cup played between Buller and West Coast
- New Zealand Heartland XV
- Ranfurly Shield 2010–2019
- 2011 ITM Cup
