= Heartland Championship =

New Zealand rugby union competition

- Current season, competition or edition: 2026 Heartland Championship
- Formerly: National Provincial Championship (1976–2005)
- Sport: Rugby union
- Founded: 2006; 20 years ago
- No. of teams: 12
- Country: New Zealand
- Most recent champion: Mid Canterbury (2025)
- Most titles: Whanganui (6 titles)
- Broadcaster: Sky Sport
- Sponsor: Toyota Hilux
- Related competitions: Farah Palmer Cup; National Provincial Championship
- Website: provincial.rugby

The Heartland Championship is an annual round-robin rugby union competition in men's domestic New Zealand rugby. First played in 2006, it is the third highest level of competition in New Zealand alongside the Ranfurly Shield. It is organised by New Zealand Rugby (NZR) and since 2026, it has been known as the Hilux Heartland Championship after Toyota Hilux, its naming rights sponsor.

Following the 2005 National Provincial Championship the NPC was restructured into two competitions. The Heartland Championship would include semi-professional and amateur players, and consist of the bottom twelve populated and performing regional teams. The higher ranked teams would compete in the reformed professional National Provincial Championship.

== Format ==
Locations of the 2022 Heartland Championship teams.

The Heartland Championship is held annually, and starts in August. Rugby teams from 12 provincial unions compete.

Points are earned during the competition based on the following schedule:

- 4 points for a win
- 2 points for a draw
- 0 points for a loss
- 1 bonus point for scoring 4 or more tries, regardless of the final result
- 1 bonus point for a loss by 7 points or less

=== Prior to 2011 ===
Prior to the 2011 Competition, the tournament was conducted in three rounds. This was similar to the structure of the 2006 Air New Zealand Cup, but that competition collapsed its first two phases into one effective in 2007. At the start of Round One, the 12 teams would split into seeded pools of six teams each, Pool A and Pool B. Seedings were also based on positions in the previous year's competition. During Round One, each team would play the other teams in its pool once. All teams would have either two or three home fixtures, with the three highest seeds in each pool at the start of the season receiving the extra home fixture.

All teams would advance to Round Two. The top three teams in each pool advance to the Meads Cup, while the bottom three teams enter the Lochore Cup.

Round two saw each team in both the Meads and Lochore Cups playing the three teams that it did not play during Round One. The three teams with the most competition points in Round One would play two home fixtures and one away, while the other three teams would play one home fixture and two away.

All competition points from Round One carried over to Round Two, and the competition points earned in both rounds determined the teams that advanced to the semifinals of each Cup in Round Three. The top four teams in the Meads and Lochore Cup competitions at the end of Round Two advanced to the semifinals.

=== Round Robin ===
This round sees the 12 teams playing 8 games each. 1st to 4th on the ladder at the end of the 8 weeks will play off for the Meads Cup, while 5th to 8th play off for the Lochore Cup.

=== Finals ===
The Meads and Lochore Cup winners are both determined in four-team single-elimination tournaments. The semifinal matchups are seeded 1-4 and 2-3, with the higher seed receiving home field advantage. The highest surviving seed hosts each Cup final.

== Teams ==
The Heartland Championship is contested by the following teams:

Team	Union	Established	Location	Venue
Buller	Buller Rugby Union	1894; 132 years ago	Westport	Victoria Square
Ngati Porou East Coast	Ngāti Porou East Coast Rugby Union	1922; 104 years ago	Ruatoria	Whakarua Park
Horowhenua Kapiti	Horowhenua Kapiti Rugby Football Union	1893; 133 years ago	Levin	Levin Domain
King Country	King Country Rugby Union	1922; 104 years ago	Te Kuiti	Rugby Park, Te Kuiti
Mid Canterbury	Mid Canterbury Rugby Union	1904; 122 years ago	Ashburton	Ashburton Showgrounds
North Otago	North Otago Rugby Football Union	1927; 99 years ago	Oamaru	Whitestone Contracting Stadium
Poverty Bay	Poverty Bay Rugby Football Union	1890; 136 years ago	Gisborne	More FM Rugby Park
South Canterbury	South Canterbury Rugby Football Union	1888; 138 years ago	Timaru	Alpine Energy Stadium
Thames Valley	Thames Valley Rugby Union	1922; 104 years ago	Paeroa	Boyd Park
Wairarapa Bush	Wairarapa Bush Rugby Football Union	1971; 55 years ago	Masterton	Trust House Memorial Park
West Coast	West Coast Rugby Union	1890; 136 years ago	Greymouth	John Sturgeon Park
Whanganui	Whanganui Rugby Football Union	1888; 138 years ago	Whanganui	Cooks Gardens

Prior to 2006, East Coast, North Otago, Poverty Bay and Whanganui competed in Division Two of the NPC, alongside Counties-Manukau, Hawke's Bay, Manawatu, Nelson Bays and Marlborough (all promoted to the Air New Zealand Cup, Nelson Bays and Marlborough merging to form Tasman). The remaining teams competed in Division Three of the NPC.

== Champions ==
Year	Meads Cup	Lochore Cup
2006	Wairarapa Bush	Poverty Bay
2007	North Otago	Poverty Bay
2008	Wanganui	Poverty Bay
2009	Wanganui	North Otago
2010	North Otago	Wairarapa Bush
2011	Wanganui	Poverty Bay
2012	East Coast	Buller
2013	Mid Canterbury	South Canterbury
2014	Mid Canterbury	Wanganui
2015	Wanganui	King Country
2016	Wanganui	North Otago
2017	Wanganui	Mid Canterbury
2018	Thames Valley	Horowhenua-Kapiti
2019	North Otago	South Canterbury
2021	South Canterbury	Whanganui
2022	South Canterbury	East Coast
2023	South Canterbury	West Coast
2024	Thames Valley	King Country
2025	Mid Canterbury	North Otago
2026	King Country	Whanganui

No Heartland Championship was held in 2020 due to COVID-19.

=== Meads Cup winners ===
Team	Titles	Years	Runners-up	Years
Whanganui	6	2008, 2009, 2011, 2015, 2016, 2017	7	2006, 2007, 2010, 2012, 2019, 2022, 2023
Mid Canterbury	3	2013, 2014, 2025	4	2008, 2009, 2024, 2026
South Canterbury	3	2021, 2022, 2023	2	2015, 2018,
North Otago	3	2007, 2010, 2019	1	2013
Thames Valley	2	2018, 2024	2	2021, 2025
Ngati Porou East Coast	1	2012	1	2011
Wairarapa Bush	1	2006	—	—
King Country	1	2026	—	—
Buller	—	—	2	2014, 2016
Horowhenua-Kapiti	—	—	1	2017
Poverty Bay	—	—	—	—
West Coast	—	—	—	—

=== Lochore Cup winners ===
Team	Titles	Years	Runners-up	Years
Poverty Bay	4	2006, 2007, 2008, 2011	1	2023
North Otago	3	2009, 2016, 2025	3	2014, 2015, 2021
Whanganui	3	2014, 2021, 2026	-	—
South Canterbury	2	2013, 2019	3	2007, 2011, 2012
King Country	2	2015, 2024	2	2006, 2016
Buller	1	2012	2	2010, 2013
West Coast	1	2023	4	2009, 2017, 2019, 2024
Horowhenua-Kapiti	1	2018	2	2008, 2025
Mid Canterbury	1	2017	2	2022, 2026
Ngati Porou East Coast	1	2022	—	—
Wairarapa Bush	1	2010	1	2018
Thames Valley	—	—	—	—

== Osborne Taonga ==
In 2021, a new challenge trophy for the Heartland Championship teams was announced, named after 16-test All Black Bill Osborne. It would follow similar rules to the Ranfurly Shield.

The Osborne Taonga was designed and created by Otaki-based Kaiwhakaairo (carver) and artist Jason Hina (Ngā Rauru Kiitahi, Te Atihaunui ā Pāpārangi, Ngāti Apa, Ngāpuhi, Ngāti Kauwhata and Ngāti Raukawa) and fellow carver Bill Doyle, who created the Tū Kotahi Aotearoa trophy.

The 5th ranked team from the 2021 Heartland Championship regular season, Poverty Bay, was the inaugural winner of this trophy after beating the 6th placed Mid Canterbury by 33 points to 26. Poverty Bay therefore earned the right to defend the trophy in the 2022 Heartland Championship season.

== Ian Kirkpatrick Medal ==
Since 2022, the Heartland Championship Player of the Year award has been awarded a medal named after former All Blacks captain Ian Kirkpatrick.

Winners of the Medal are:

- 2022 Sam Parkes (East Coast). Other finalists were Siu Kakala (South Canterbury) and Semi Vodosese (Whanganui).
- 2023 Siu Kakala (South Canterbury). Other finalists were Stuart Leach (Poverty Bay) and Alekesio Vakarorogo (Whanganui)
- 2024 Alekesio Vakarorogo (Whanganui)
- 2025 Keanu Taumata (Poverty Bay)

== Heartland Championship representative team ==
Each year, a New Zealand Heartland XV is selected to recognise the top performing players in the Championship. The team selected plays various fixtures and in some years goes on an overseas tour.

== See also ==
- National Provincial Championship (1976–2005)
- National Provincial Championship (2006–present)
- List of New Zealand rugby union teams
- Hanan Shield competed for by Mid Canterbury, North Otago and South Canterbury
- Rundle Cup played between Buller and West Coast
