= 2006 Heartland Championship =

Amateur rugby union competition in New Zealand

- Date: 19 August 2006–21 October 2006
- Countries: New Zealand

Final positions
- Champions: Wairarapa Bush (Meads Cup); Poverty Bay (Lochore Cup)
- Runner-up: Wanganui (Meads Cup); King Country (Lochore Cup)

Tournament statistics
- Matches played: 54

The 2006 Heartland Championship was the inaugural season of the Heartland Championship, an amateur rugby union competition in New Zealand, following the reorganisation of the Second and Third Divisions of the country's former rugby competition, the National Provincial Championship. The competition featured 12 teams, divided into two pools of six.

At the end of Round 1, the top three teams from each pool contested the Meads Cup, and the bottom three from each pool contested the Lochore Cup. Competition points from Round 1 carried over to Round 2, in which each team in each cup competition played a round-robin with the three teams it did not play in Round 1. At the end of Round 2, the top four teams in each cup competition entered a single-elimination playoff for the Meads and Lochore Cups. The cups were named after Colin Meads and Brian Lochore, both legendary players for the country's national team.

The inaugural Meads Cup champion was Wairarapa Bush, and Poverty Bay lifted the first Lochore Cup.

== Round 1 ==
=== Standings ===
The top three places in each pool, highlighted in blue, advanced to the Meads Cup. The remaining teams entered the Lochore Cup.

==== Pool A ====
Qualified for Meads Cup

Pos	Team	Pld	W	D	L	For	Against	+/−	BP	Pts
1	Wairarapa Bush	5	5	0	0	111	74	+37	1	21
2	North Otago	5	4	0	1	200	74	+126	4	20
3	Mid Canterbury	5	2	0	3	92	98	−6	2	10
4	Buller	5	2	0	3	93	125	−32	1	9
5	East Coast	5	1	0	4	64	125	−61	2	6
6	West Coast	5	1	0	4	81	145	−64	2	6

==== Pool B ====
Qualified for Meads Cup

Pos	Team	Pld	W	D	L	For	Against	+/−	BP	Pts
1	Wanganui	5	4	1	0	186	79	+107	3	21
2	South Canterbury	5	3	0	2	77	76	+1	2	14
3	Horowhenua-Kapiti	5	2	1	2	98	133	−35	2	12
4	Poverty Bay	5	2	0	3	123	140	−17	2	10
5	Thames Valley	5	2	0	3	85	126	−41	2	10
6	King Country	5	0	2	3	77	92	−15	2	6

- Pos = Table position
- Pld = Played
- W = Win (Worth 4 points)
- D = Draw (Worth 2 points)
- L = Loss (Worth 0 points)
- For = For (total points scored)
- Against = Against (total points scored against)
- +/− = Points difference (total points scored minus total points against)
- BP = Bonus points (teams can score additional bonus points by certain scenarios: one bonus point will be awarded to any team that scores four tries or more regardless of win/loss/draw, and another bonus point will be awarded to the losing side if the loss is by seven points or less. It is possible to receive two bonus points in a loss.)
- Pts = Progressive points tally

=== Results ===
==== Week 1 ====
19 August 2006	East Coast	7–25	Mid Canterbury	Ruatoria
19 August 2006	Wairarapa Bush	31–13	Buller	Masterton
19 August 2006	North Otago	67–3	West Coast	Oamaru
19 August 2006	Wanganui	65–18	Thames Valley	Wanganui
19 August 2006	Horowhenua-Kapiti	23–23	King Country	Levin
19 August 2006	Poverty Bay	22–30	South Canterbury	Gisborne

==== Week 2 ====
26 August 2006	Thames Valley	19–21	Poverty Bay	Paeroa
26 August 2006	Horowhenua-Kapiti	20–12	South Canterbury	Levin
26 August 2006	King Country	23–23	Wanganui	Te Kūiti
26 August 2006	Mid Canterbury	16–28	North Otago	Ashburton
26 August 2006	Buller	28–18	East Coast	Westport
26 August 2006	Wairarapa Bush	31–18	West Coast	Masterton

==== Week 3 ====
2 September 2006	East Coast	6–10	Wairarapa Bush	Ruatoria
2 September 2006	West Coast	24–9	Mid Canterbury	Greymouth
2 September 2006	North Otago	37–24	Buller	Oamaru
2 September 2006	South Canterbury	16–13	Thames Valley	Timaru
2 September 2006	Wanganui	46–3	Horowhenua-Kapiti	Wanganui
2 September 2006	Poverty Bay	19–18	King Country	Gisborne

==== Week 4 ====
9 September 2006	Horowhenua-Kapiti	32–31	Poverty Bay	Levin
9 September 2006	King Country	3–13	Thames Valley	Taupō
9 September 2006	Wanganui	11–5	South Canterbury	Wanganui
9 September 2006	Wairarapa Bush	19–18	North Otago	Masterton
9 September 2006	Buller	19–23	Mid Canterbury	Westport
9 September 2006	East Coast	22–20	West Coast	Ruatoria

==== Week 5 ====
Pool	Date	Time	Home team	Score	Away team	Score
A	16 September	14:30	Mid Canterbury (1 BP)	19	Wairarapa Bush	20
A	16 September	14:30	North Otago (1 BP)	50	East Coast	12
A	16 September	14:35	West Coast (1 BP)	16	Buller	17
B	16 September	14:30	South Canterbury	14	King Country (1 BP)	10
B	16 September	14:30	Thames Valley	22	Horowhenua-Kapiti (1 BP)	21
B	16 September	14:30	Poverty Bay (1 BP)	30	Wanganui (1 BP)	41

== Round 2 ==
=== Standings ===
==== Meads Cup Pool ====
Pos	Name	Pld	W	D	L	F	A	+/−	BP	Pts
1	Wanganui	8	7	1	0	123	67	+56	5	35
2	Wairarapa Bush	8	7	0	1	100	56	+44	3	31
3	North Otago	8	6	0	2	132	80	+52	7	31
4	Mid Canterbury	8	4	0	4	63	80	−17	3	19
5	South Canterbury	8	3	0	5	28	102	−74	2	14
6	Horowhenua-Kapiti	8	2	1	5	65	126	−61	3	13

==== Lochore Cup Pool ====
Pos	Name	Pld	W	D	L	F	A	+/−	BP	Pts
1	Poverty Bay	8	5	0	3	120	54	+66	4	24
2	Thames Valley	8	4	0	4	107	51	+56	5	21
3	King Country	8	3	2	3	81	40	+41	4	20
4	Buller	8	3	0	5	46	57	−11	2	14
5	East Coast	8	1	0	7	44	130	−86	2	6
6	West Coast	8	1	0	7	55	121	−66	2	6

=== Results ===
==== Week 6 ====
Pool	Date	Time	Home team	Score	Away team	Score
MC	23 September	14:30	Wanganui (1 BP)	46	Mid Canterbury	8
MC	23 September	14:30	Wairarapa Bush	31	Horowhenua-Kapiti	11
MC	23 September	14:30	North Otago (1 BP)	36	South Canterbury	6
LC	23 September	14:30	Thames Valley (1 BP)	51	West Coast	16
LC	23 September	14:30	Poverty Bay	33	East Coast	15
LC	23 September	14:30	Buller (1 BP)	6	King Country	11

==== Week 7 ====
Pool	Date	Time	Home team	Score	Away team	Score
MC	30 September	14:30	Mid Canterbury (1 BP)	36	Horowhenua-Kapiti (1 BP)	29
MC	30 September	14:30	North Otago (1 BP)	37	Wanganui (1 BP)	49
MC	30 September	14:30	Wairarapa Bush (1 BP)	47	South Canterbury	17
LC	30 September	14:30	East Coast	17	Thames Valley (1 BP)	40
LC	30 September	14:30	Buller	22	Poverty Bay (1 BP)	30
MC	30 September	14:30	West Coast	22	King Country (1 BP)	32

==== Week 8 ====
Pool	Date	Time	Home team	Score	Away team	Score
MC	7 October	14:30	Wanganui	28	Wairarapa Bush (1 BP)	22
MC	7 October	14:30	Horowhenua-Kapiti	25	North Otago (1 BP)	59
MC	7 October	14:30	South Canterbury	5	Mid Canterbury	19
LC	7 October	14:00	Thames Valley (1 BP)	16	Buller	18
LC	7 October	14:30	Poverty Bay (1 BP)	57	West Coast	17
LC	7 October	14:30	King Country (1 BP)	38	East Coast	12

== Semifinals ==
=== Results ===
==== Meads Cup ====
Date	Time	Home team	Score	Away team	Score
14 October	16:35	Wanganui	30	Mid Canterbury	17
14 October	14:30	Wairarapa Bush	25	North Otago	19

==== Lochore Cup ====
Date	Time	Home team	Score	Away team	Score
14 October	14:30	Poverty Bay	36	Buller	10
14 October	14:00	Thames Valley	15	King Country	17

== Finals ==
=== Results ===
==== Meads Cup ====
Date	Time	Home team	Score	Away team	Score
21 October	16:30	Wanganui	14	Wairarapa Bush	16

==== Lochore Cup ====
Date	Time	Home team	Score	Away team	Score
21 October	14:15	Poverty Bay	46	King Country	34

== See also ==
- Hanan Shield competed for by Mid Canterbury, North Otago and South Canterbury
- Rundle Cup played between Buller and West Coast
- New Zealand Heartland XV
- Ranfurly Shield 2000–2009
- 2005 Air New Zealand Cup
