= 2008 Heartland Championship =

Amateur rugby union competition in New Zealand

- Date: 23 August 2008–25 October 2008
- Countries: New Zealand

Final positions
- Champions: Wanganui (Meads Cup); Poverty Bay (Lochore Cup)
- Runner-up: Mid Canterbury (Meads Cup); Horowhenua-Kapiti (Lochore Cup)

The 2008 Heartland Championship was the third season of the Heartland Championship, a provincial rugby union competition involving 12 teams from New Zealand split into two pools. Matches started on Saturday 23 August 2008 and ended with the final on 25 October.

The 2008 season was to be the last in its current format. On 11 August 2008 the New Zealand Rugby Union announced that Tasman and Northland would be the two teams relegated from the Air New Zealand Cup after the completion of the 2008 season. Both teams failed to meet criteria which included financial stability, population, player training and development, playing history, and administration. This might have meant that the Tasman union would have been split into its constituent Nelson Bays and Marlborough unions, and that the Heartland Championship would have needed to accommodate three further teams. On 26 September 2008 the New Zealand Rugby Union rescinded this decision.

Wanganui won the Meads Cup and Poverty Bay won the Lochore Cup. Each team has reached the respective cup final in all three years of the Heartland Championship. Poverty Bay has won each Lochore Cup, while 2008 was Wanganui's first Meads Cup championship.

== Standings ==
The 12 teams were split into two pools, with the top three from each pool after five rounds advancing to the Meads Cup round, while the bottom three from each pool played for the Lochore Cup.

=== Pool A ===
Qualified for Meads Cup
Qualified for Lochore Cup

Pos	Team	Pld	W	D	L	PF	PA	PD	BP1	BP2	Pts
1	North Otago	5	4	0	1	123	75	+48	2	0	18
2	West Coast	5	3	0	2	110	87	+23	2	2	16
3	Buller	5	3	1	1	83	82	+1	0	1	15
4	Horowhenua-Kapiti	5	1	2	2	107	125	−18	3	0	11
5	Wairarapa Bush	5	1	0	4	116	147	−31	3	3	10
6	South Canterbury	5	1	1	3	93	116	−23	1	1	8

=== Pool B ===
Pos	Team	Pld	W	D	L	PF	PA	PD	BP1	BP2	Pts
1	Wanganui	5	5	0	0	240	53	+187	5	0	25
2	Mid Canterbury	5	4	0	1	171	96	+75	4	0	20
3	King Country	5	3	0	2	119	96	+23	2	0	14
4	Poverty Bay	5	2	0	3	117	90	+27	2	0	10
5	Thames Valley	5	1	0	4	64	171	−107	0	0	4
6	East Coast	5	0	0	5	15	220	−205	0	0	0

=== Table notes ===
- Pos = Table position
- Pld = Played
- W = Win (worth 4 points)
- D = Draw (worth 2 points)
- L = Loss (worth 0 points)
- PF = For (total points scored)
- PA = Against (total points scored against)
- PD = Points difference
- BP1 = Try bonus points (1 bonus point awarded to any team that scores 4 tries or more regardless of win/loss/draw)
- BP2 = Losing bonus points (1 bonus point awarded to the losing side if the loss is by 7 points or fewer)
- Pts = Progressive points tally

NB:

- It is possible to receive two bonus points in a loss.
- In the event of a tie on points, the higher-ranked team is decided on the basis of who won their meeting in pool play. If they remain tied, then it is decided by overall points difference.

== Fixtures and results ==
=== Round 1 ===
Pool	Home	Score	Away	Match information
Pool	Home	Score	Away	Date	Venue	Attendance
A	Wairarapa Bush (2 BP)	31-37	West Coast (1 BP)	23 August 2008	Masterton	1,000
A	Buller	18-17	South Canterbury (1 BP)	23 August 2008	Westport	400
A	North Otago (1 BP)	32-11	Horowhenua-Kapiti	23 August 2008	Oamaru	750
B	Mid Canterbury (1 BP)	49-20	Thames Valley	23 August 2008	Ashburton	200
B	King Country	18-0	Poverty Bay	23 August 2008	Te Kūiti	550
B	Wanganui (1 BP)	71-6	East Coast	23 August 2008	Wanganui	1,100

=== Round 2 ===
Pool	Home	Score	Away	Match information
Pool	Home	Score	Away	Date	Venue	Attendance
A	West Coast (1 BP)	9-15	North Otago	30 August 2008	Greymouth	300
A	Buller	16-16	Horowhenua-Kapiti	30 August 2008	Westport	500
A	South Canterbury	19-27	Wairarapa Bush (1 BP)	30 August 2008	Timaru	500
B	Thames Valley	0-43	Wanganui (1 BP)	30 August 2008	Paeroa	300
B	King Country (1 BP)	32-3	East Coast	30 August 2008	Taupō	800
B	Poverty Bay	13-26	Mid Canterbury (1 BP)	30 August 2008	Gisborne	550

=== Round 3 ===
Pool	Home	Score	Away	Match information
Pool	Home	Score	Away	Date	Venue
A	Horowhenua-Kapiti (1BP)	13-15	West Coast	6 September 2008	Paraparaumu
A	North Otago	10-18	South Canterbury	6 September 2008	Oamaru
A	Wairarapa Bush (1BP)	8-11	Buller	6 September 2008	Masterton
B	East Coast	3-20	Thames Valley	6 September 2008	Ruatoria
B	Mid Canterbury (1BP)	32-17	King Country	6 September 2008	Ashburton
B	Wanganui (1BP)	36-16	Poverty Bay	6 September 2008	Wanganui

This was the first time Buller had beaten Wairarapa Bush at Masterton in the history of the two unions' meetings.

=== Round 4 ===
Pool	Home	Score	Away	Match information
Pool	Home	Score	Away	Date	Venue
A	Buller	18–22	North Otago	13 September 2008	Westport
A	South Canterbury	8–30	West Coast (1BP)	13 September 2008	Timaru
A	Wairarapa Bush (2BP)	31–36	Horowhenua-Kapiti (1BP)	13 September 2008	Masterton
B	Poverty Bay (1BP)	43–10	Thames Valley	13 September 2008	Gisborne
B	King Country	19–47	Wanganui (1BP)	13 September 2008	Te Kūiti
B	Mid Canterbury (1BP)	52–3	East Coast	13 September 2008	Ashburton

=== Round 5 ===
Pool	Home	Score	Away	Match information
Pool	Home	Score	Away	Date	Venue	Attendance
A	West Coast (1BP)	19–20	Buller	20 September 2008	Greymouth	600
A	North Otago (1BP)	44–19	Wairarapa Bush	20 September 2008	Oamaru	600
A	Horowhenua-Kapiti (1BP)	31–31	South Canterbury (1BP)	20 September 2008	Levin	500
B	Thames Valley	14–33	King Country (1BP)	20 September 2008	Te Aroha	600
B	Wanganui (1BP)	43–12	Mid Canterbury	20 September 2008	Wanganui	1,500
B	East Coast	0–43	Poverty Bay (1BP)	20 September 2008	Ruatoria	500

Buller wins the 2008 Rundle Cup

== Meads and Lochore Cups ==
=== Standings ===
==== Lochore Cup Pool ====
Qualified for playoff

Pos	Team	Pld	W	D	L	PF	PA	PD	BP1	BP2	Pts
1	Poverty Bay	8	4	0	4	196	121	+75	3	0	23
2	Horowhenua-Kapiti	8	3	2	3	234	174	+60	5	0	21
3	Wairarapa Bush	8	3	0	5	202	194	+8	4	3	19
4	South Canterbury	8	3	1	4	181	167	+14	2	2	19
5	Thames Valley	8	1	0	7	97	255	−158	0	0	4
6	East Coast	8	0	0	8	50	306	−356	0	0	0

==== Meads Cup Pool ====
Pos	Team	Pld	W	D	L	PF	PA	PD	BP1	BP2	Pts
1	Wanganui	8	8	0	0	353	78	+275	7	0	39
2	Mid Canterbury	8	7	0	1	225	129	+96	5	0	33
3	North Otago	8	5	0	3	169	117	+52	3	1	24
4	West Coast	8	3	0	5	122	146	−24	2	3	21
5	Buller	8	4	1	3	135	164	−29	0	1	19
6	King Country	8	3	0	5	157	172	−15	3	1	16

=== Round 6 ===
Pool	Home	Score	Away	Match information
Pool	Home	Score	Away	Date	Venue	Attendance
M	Wanganui (1BP)	42–10	Buller	27 September 2008	Wanganui	1,200
M	North Otago (1BP)	27–8	King Country	27 September 2008	Oamaru	300
M	Mid Canterbury	7–5	West Coast (1BP)	27 September 2008	Ashburton	200
L	Horowhenua-Kapiti (1BP)	73–7	East Coast	27 September 2008	Levin	700
L	Poverty Bay	19–5	South Canterbury	27 September 2008	Gisborne	500
L	Wairarapa Bush	11–0	Thames Valley	27 September 2008	Masterton	400

=== Round 7 ===
Pool	Home	Score	Away	Match information
Pool	Home	Score	Away	Date	Venue
M	West Coast	7–52	Wanganui (1BP)	4 October 2008	Westport
M	North Otago (1BP)	11–15	Mid Canterbury	4 October 2008	Oamaru
M	Buller	25–8	King Country	4 October 2008	Westport
L	Thames Valley	6–36	Horowhenua-Kapiti (1BP)	4 October 2008
L	Poverty Bay	24–8	Wairarapa Bush	4 October 2008	Gisborne
L	East Coast	5–46	South Canterbury (1BP)	4 October 2008	Ruatoria

=== Round 8 ===
Pool	Home	Score	Away	Match information
Pool	Home	Score	Away	Date	Venue
M	Wanganui	19–8	North Otago	11 October 2008	Wanganui
M	Mid Canterbury (1BP)	32–17	Buller	11 October 2008	Ashburton
M	King Country (2BP)	22–24	West Coast	11 October 2008	Taupō
L	Horowhenua-Kapiti	18–36	Poverty Bay (1BP)	11 October 2008	Levin
L	South Canterbury (1BP)	37–27	Thames Valley	11 October 2008	Timaru
L	Wairarapa Bush (1BP)	67–23	East Coast	11 October 2008	Masterton

== Knockout stage ==
=== Lochore Cup ===
Semi-finals
18 October – Gisborne
Poverty Bay	43
South Canterbury	30
18 October – Levin
Horowhenua-Kapiti	37
Wairarapa Bush	17

Final
25 October – Gisborne
Poverty Bay	26
Horowhenua-Kapiti	5

==== Semifinals ====
Home	Score	Away	Match information
Home	Score	Away	Date	Venue
Poverty Bay	43–30	South Canterbury	18 October 2008	Gisborne
Horowhenua-Kapiti	37–17	Wairarapa Bush	18 October 2008	Levin

==== Final ====
Home	Score	Away	Match information
Home	Score	Away	Date	Venue
Poverty Bay	26–5	Horowhenua-Kapiti	25 October 2008	Gisborne

=== Meads Cup ===
Semi-finals
18 October – Wanganui
Wanganui	40
West Coast	18
18 October – Ashburton
Mid Canterbury	38
North Otago	24

Final
25 October – Wanganui
Wanganui	27
Mid Canterbury	12

==== Semifinals ====
Home	Score	Away	Match information
Home	Score	Away	Date	Venue
Wanganui	40–18	West Coast	18 October 2008	Wanganui
Mid Canterbury	38–24	North Otago	18 October 2008	Ashburton

==== Final ====
Home	Score	Away	Match information
Home	Score	Away	Date	Venue
Wanganui	27–12	Mid Canterbury	25 October 2008	Wanganui

== See also ==
- Hanan Shield competed for by Mid Canterbury, North Otago and South Canterbury
- Rundle Cup played between Buller and West Coast
- New Zealand Heartland XV
- Ranfurly Shield 2000–2009
- 2008 Air New Zealand Cup
