= Rundle Cup =

New Zealand Rugby union football trophy

The Rundle Cup is a rugby trophy that has been contested between the West Coast and Buller rugby unions since 1911. It replaced the Molloy Cup. Of the 37 challenge trophies contested by two provinces in New Zealand rugby it is of the longest continuous existence. It is also the second oldest provincial trophy after the Ranfurly Shield, which commenced in 1904.

== Origins ==
The Rundle Cup was donated to the West Coast provincial union during their Annual General Meeting at the Albion Hotel on 24 May 1911 by William Rundle as a trophy for Buller-West Coast matches. Rundle was a local business man in the mining industry and former player for the Grey Football Club. He later perished on the frontline in France during World War One. The first contest for the cup was held in 1911 in Westport and was won by Buller.

== Rundle Cup results ==
Since the introduction of the National Provincial Championship (1976–2005) and the Heartland Championship the draws for those competitions have dictated the fixture date and venues for the Rundle Cup.

In past years Buller and West Coast have often played two or more times in a single season. It is often not recorded in sources, such as the New Zealand Rugby Almanac, whether the Rundle Cup was at stake in those games. Matches between the unions have included the following.

Year	Venue	Winner	Score
12-08-1911	Westport	Buller	16-10
26-08-1911	Greymouth	West Coast	20-13
1912	did not play		
23-08-1913	Greymouth	Buller	20-9
20-09-1913	Westport	Buller	9-5
22-08-1914	Westport	Buller	24-8
05-09-1914	Greymouth	Buller	12-11
30-08-1919	Westport	Buller	14-6
16-07-1921	Westport	West Coast	9-3
29-07-1922	Greymouth	West Coast	14-12
07-07-1923	Greymouth	West Coast	9-6
17-05-1924	Greymouth	Buller	5-3
26-06-1925	Greymouth	West Coast	8-6
06-07-1929	Westport	West Coast	5-0
04-07-1931	Westport	Buller	11-3
09-07-1932	Greymouth	Buller	9-6
01-07-1933	Westport	West Coast	11-8
23-06-1934	Greymouth	West Coast	19-0
25-05-1935	Westport	West Coast	19-6
27-07-1935	Greymouth	Buller	11-6
11-07-1936	Westport	Drawn	3-3
26-06-1937	Westport	West Coast	18-0
25-06-1938	Greymouth	West Coast	10-3
16-07-1938	Westport	Buller	17-6
01-07-1939	Westport	Buller	8-6
15-07-1939	Greymouth	Buller	12-3
06-07-1940	Westport	West Coast	18-6
20-07-1940	Greymouth	West Coast	12-8
19-07-1941	Greymouth	Drawn	6-6
09-08-1941	Westport	Buller	6-3
13-09-1941	Greymouth	West Coast	4-3
04-07-1942	Westport	West Coast	17-0
18-07-1942	Greymouth	West Coast	8-6
12-09-1942	Westport	Drawn	3-3
03-07-1943	Greymouth	West Coast	8-0
17-07-1943	Westport	Buller	13-9
11-09-1943	Westport	Buller	7-3
17-06-1944	Westport	Buller	8-5
29-07-1944	Greymouth	West Coast	11-6
09-09-1944	Westport	Drawn	0-0
07-10-1944	Greymouth	West Coast	14-11
30-06-1945	Greymouth	Buller	13-9
14-07-1945	Westport	West Coast	9-8
25-08-1945	Westport	Buller	14-8
22-06-1946	Westport	Buller	16-11
29-06-1946	Greymouth	Buller	14-6
14-06-1947	Hokitika	Buller	16-8
28-06-1947	Westport	West Coast	15-12
02-08-1947	Greymouth	Buller	6-3
26-06-1948	Westport	West Coast	15-12
17-07-1948	Greymouth	Buller	13-6
18-09-1948	Westport	Buller	21-6
25-06-1949	Westport	Buller	14-3
16-07-1949	Hokitika	Buller	6-5
06-08-1949	Westport	Drawn	9-9
06-05-1950	Greymouth	Drawn	19-19
24-06-1950	Westport	West Coast	24-12
22-07-1950	Westport	Buller	13-6
23-06-1951	Westport	Drawn	8-8
07-07-1951	Hokitika	West Coast	11-6
01-09-1951	Greymouth	West Coast	18-3
07-06-1952	Hokitika	Buller	14-8
21-06-1952	Westport	West Coast	26-12
05-07-1952		West Coast	11-0
13-06-1953	Westport	West Coast	14-9
27-06-1953	Hokitika	West Coast	29-6
05-09-1953	Greymouth	Buller	0-8
19-06-1954	Hokitika	West Coast	22-19
10-07-1954	Westport	West Coast	6-3
07-08-1954	Westport	West Coast	21-0
18-06-1955	Hokitika	Buller	15-3
02-07-1955	Westport	Buller	9-6
05-05-1956	Westport	West Coast	17-14
26-05-1956	Hokitika	Buller	14-5
13-04-1957	Hokitika	Buller	16-12
06-07-1957		West Coast	19-8
14/09/1957	Greyymouth	Buller	22-11
21-06-1958	Westport	West Coast	8-3
19-07-1958		Drawn	0-0
30-08-1958	Westport	West Coast	15-14
16-05-1959	Hokitika	West Coast	25-6
02-07-1960	Greymouth	Buller	11-6
17-06-1961	Hokitika	West Coast	16-8
15-07-1961	Westport	West Coast	8-5
30-06-1962	Westport	West Coast	13-6
21-07-1962	Hokitika	West Coast	11-6
29-06-1963	Hokitika	West Coast	8-6
13-07-1963	Westport	West Coast	14-9
24-08-1963	Westport	Buller	9-6
16-05-1964	Westport	West Coast	9-5
11-07-1964	Greymouth	West Coast	17-15
29-08-1964	Greymouth	Buller	14-3
15-05-1965	Greymouth	Buller	17-6
12-06-1965	Westport	West Coast	14-9
28-05-1966	Westport	West Coast	8-6
11-06-1966	Greymouth	West Coast	17-15
27-05-1967	Hokitika	Buller	11-5
22-07-1967	Westport	West Coast	14-12
11-05-1968	Westport	West Coast	22-19
20-07-1968	Hokitika	West Coast	12-6
17-05-1969	Greymouth	West Coast	16-6
19-07-1969	Westport	West Coast	13-11
04-07-1970	Westport	Buller	11-3
22-08-1970	Hokitika	West Coast	21-9
15-05-1971	Hokitika	West Coast	25-20
08-08-1971	Ngakawau	West Coast	21-16
27-05-1972	Westport	Buller	7-4
17-06-1972	Greymouth	Buller	13-6
05-08-1972	Greymouth	Buller	13-10
16-06-1973	Westport	West Coast	24-7
11-08-1973	Hokitika	West Coast	16-9
14-07-1974	Greymouth	West Coast	14-6
17-08-1974	Westport	Buller	18-15
21-06-1975	Westport	Buller	16-0
31-07-1976	Greymouth	Buller	16-6
11-06-1977	Westport	West Coast	12-3
24-06-1978	Greymouth	West Coast	17-6
12-08-1978	Westport	West Coast	15-7
23-06-1979	Westport	Buller	17-6
09-08-1980	Hokitika	West Coast	32-9
27-06-1981	Westport	Buller	16-12
10-07-1982	Greymouth	West Coast	16-12
28-05-1983	Greymouth	West Coast	18-10
26-08-1983	Westport	Buller	21-9
23-06-1984	Greymouth	Buller	6-4
26-05-1985	Greymouth	Buller	20-18
07-09-1985	Westport	Buller	17-6
14-06-1986	Greymouth	Buller	23-6
30-05-1987	Greymouth	West Coast	14-0
27-06-1987	Westport	Drawn	7-7
06-06-1988	Westport	Buller	37-3
03-06-1989	Westport	Buller	13-4
02-06-1990	Greymouth	West Coast	24-3
03-06-1991	Westport	Buller	13-12
01-06-1992	Greymouth	Buller	31-3
05-06-1993	Westport	Buller	33-10
04-06-1994	Westport	Buller	20-13
03-06-1995	Greymouth	West Coast	19-0
18-05-1996	Westport	Buller	34-23
17-08-1997	Greymouth	West Coast	16-7
10-05-1998	Westport	Buller	16-6
07-08-1999	Greymouth	West Coast	29-12
03-06-2000	Westport	West Coast	17-5
07-10-2000	Greymouth	Buller	23-10
04-06-2001	Greymouth	Buller	20-9
08-09-2001	Greymouth	Buller	27-8
31-08-2002	Westport	West Coast	25-20
02-06-2003	Westport	Buller	7-3
13-09-2003	Greymouth	Buller	25-13
04-09-2004	Greymouth	West Coast	23-0
03-09-2005	Westport	Buller	24-12
16-09-2006	Greymouth	Buller	17-16
20-09-2008	Greymouth	Buller	20-19
12-09-2009	Greymouth	West Coast	26-20
24-10-2009	Greymouth	West Coast	53-22
16-10-2010	Westport	Buller	20-11
24-09-2011	Westport	Buller	21-15
13-10-2012	Westport	Buller	26-18
24-08-2013	Greymouth	West Coast	23-17
04-10-2014	Westport	Buller	29-24
29-08-2015	Greymouth	West Coast	21-7
17-09-2016	Westport	Buller	48-0
02-09-2017	Greymouth	Buller	34-19
22-09-2018	Westport	West Coast	34-28
05-10-2019	Greymouth	Buller	47-7
30-10-2021	Westport	West Coast	22-14
10-09-2022	Greymouth	Buller	36-32
23-09-2023	Christchurch	Buller	29-11
7-09-2024	Westport	West Coast	20-17
4-10-2025	Greymouth	West Coast	34-11

The second match in 2009 was a semi-final of the Lochore Cup.

There was no match in 2020 due to the COVID-19 pandemic restrictions.

== See also ==
- Heartland Championship
- Lochore Cup
- Meads Cup
- Hanan Shield competed for by Mid Canterbury, North Otago and South Canterbury
