= 1965 South Africa rugby union tour of Australia and New Zealand =

Summary
P	W	D	L
Total
31	23	0	8
Test match
6	1	0	5
Opponent
P	W	D	L
Australia
2	0	0	2
New Zealand
4	1	0	3

The 1965 South Africa rugby union tour of Australasia was a long series of matches played in 1965 by South Africa national rugby union team in Australia and New Zealand. It was not a successful tour. The Springboks lost both test matches against Australia and three of their four matches with All Blacks.

== Matches in Australia ==
Scores and results list South Africa's points tally first.

Opposing Team	For	Against	Date	Venue	Status
Western Australia 2nd XV	102	0	10 June 1965	Perth	Tour match
Western Australia	60	0	10 June 1965	Perth	Tour match
(Victoria (state)) Victoria	52	6	12 June 1965	Melbourne	Tour match
New South Wales	3	12	14 June 1965	Sydney	Tour match
Australia	11	18	19 June 1965	Cricket Ground, Sydney	Test match
Queensland	50	5	22 June 1965	Ballymore, Brisbane	Tour match
Australia	8	12	26 June 1965	Lang Park, Brisbane	Test match

== Matches in New Zealand ==
Scores and results list South Africa's points tally first.

Opposing Team	For	Against	Date	Venue	Status
Poverty Bay / East Coast	32	3	30 June 1965	Rugby Park, Gisborne	Tour match
Wellington	6	23	3 July 1965	Athletic Park, Wellington	Tour match
Manawatu / Horowhenua	30	8	7 July 1965	Showgrounds, Palmerston North	Tour match
Otago	7	5	10 July 1965	Carisbrook, Dunedin	Tour match
New Zealand Juniors	23	3	14 July 1965	Lancaster Park, Christchurch	Tour match
Taranaki	11	3	17 July 1965	Rugby Park, New Plymouth	Tour match
Southland	19	6	21 July 1965	Rugby Park, Invercargill	Tour match
Canterbury	6	5	24 July 1965	Lancaster Park, Christchurch	Tour match
West Coast-Buller	11	0	27 July 1965	Rugby Park, Greymouth	Tour match
New Zealand	3	6	31 July 1965	Athletic Park, Wellington	Test match
Wanganui / King Country	24	19	4 August 1965	Cooks Gardens, Wanganui	Tour match
Waikato	26	13	7 August 1965	Rugby Park, Hamilton	Tour match
North Auckland	14	11	11 August 1965	Okara Park, Whangārei	Tour match
Auckland	14	15	14 August 1965	Eden Park, Auckland	Tour match
Marlborough / Nelson / Golden Bay-Motueka	45	6	17 August 1965	Lansdowne Park, Blenheim	Tour match
New Zealand	0	13	21 August 1965	Carisbrook, Dunedin	Test match
South Canterbury / Mid Canterbury / North Otago	28	13	25 August 1965	Fraser Park, Timaru	Tour match
New Zealand Maori	9	3	28 August 1965	Athletic Park, Wellington	Tour match
Wairarapa / Bush	36	0	31 August 1965	Memorial Park, Masterton	Tour match
New Zealand	19	16	4 September 1965	Lancaster Park, Christchurch	Test match
New Zealand Universities	55	11	8 September 1965	Eden Park, Auckland	Tour match
Hawke's Bay	30	12	11 September 1965	McLean Park, Napier	Tour match
Bay of Plenty / Counties	33	17	14 September 1965	Rugby Park, Rotorua	Tour match
New Zealand	3	20	18 September 1965	Eden Park, Auckland	Test match
