= 2019 Heartland Championship =

- Date: 24 August 2019–27 October 2019
- Countries: New Zealand

Final positions
- Champions: North Otago (Meads Cup); South Canterbury (Lochore Cup)
- Runner-up: Whanganui (Meads Cup); West Coast (Lochore Cup)

Tournament statistics
- Matches played: 54
- Website: heartlandchampionship.co.nz

The 2019 Heartland Championship, known as the 2019 Mitre 10 Heartland Championship for sponsorship reasons, was the 14th edition of the Heartland Championship, a rugby union competition involving the twelve amateur rugby unions in New Zealand. The tournament began with a round-robin stage in which the twelve teams played eight games each, from which the top four advanced to the Meads Cup semifinals, while fifth to eighth advanced to the Lochore Cup semifinals. In both of these knockout stages the top seeds (first and fifth) played at home against the lowest seeds (fourth and eighth), the second highest seeds (second and sixth) played at home against the third highest seeds (third and seventh) and the final featured the higher seed playing at home against the lower seed.

== Teams ==
Locations of the 2019 Heartland Championship teams

The 2019 Heartland Championship was contested by the following teams.

| Team | Super Rugby partner | Hometown(s) | Home stadium | Capacity |
|---|---|---|---|---|
| Buller | Crusaders | Westport | Victoria Square | 5,000 |
| East Coast | Hurricanes | Ruatoria | Whakarua Park | 3,000 |
| Horowhenua-Kapiti | Hurricanes | Levin | Levin Domain | 6,500 |
| Horowhenua-Kapiti | Hurricanes | Waikanae | Waikanae Park | |
| King Country | Chiefs | Taupō | Owen Delany Park | 20,000 |
| King Country | Chiefs | Te Kūiti | Rugby Park | |
| Mid Canterbury | Crusaders | Ashburton | Ashburton Showgrounds | 5,000 |
| North Otago | Highlanders | Oamaru | Whitestone Contracting Stadium | 7,000 |
| Poverty Bay | Hurricanes | Gisborne | More FM Rugby Park | 18,000 |
| South Canterbury | Crusaders | Timaru | Fraser Park | 12,000 |
| Thames Valley | Chiefs | Paeroa | Paeroa Domain | 3,000 |
| Wairarapa Bush | Hurricanes | Masterton | Trust House Memorial Park | 10,000 |
| Wanganui | Hurricanes | Wanganui | Cooks Gardens | 15,000 |
| West Coast | Crusaders | Greymouth | Rugby Park | 6,000 |

== Standings ==
| Pos. | Team | GP | W | D | L | PF | PA | PD | TB | LB | Pts |
|---|---|---|---|---|---|---|---|---|---|---|---|
| 1 | Thames Valley | 8 | 6 | 0 | 2 | 240 | 163 | +77 | 4 | 2 | 30 |
| 2 | North Otago | 8 | 6 | 0 | 2 | 241 | 166 | +75 | 3 | 2 | 29 |
| 3 | Wairarapa Bush | 8 | 6 | 0 | 2 | 209 | 181 | +28 | 4 | 1 | 29 |
| 4 | Wanganui | 8 | 5 | 0 | 3 | 294 | 184 | +110 | 6 | 2 | 28 |
| 5 | West Coast | 8 | 6 | 0 | 2 | 217 | 232 | -15 | 3 | 0 | 27 |
| 6 | Buller | 8 | 5 | 0 | 3 | 261 | 196 | +65 | 5 | 1 | 26 |
| 7 | South Canterbury | 8 | 4 | 1 | 3 | 237 | 176 | +61 | 4 | 3 | 25 |
| 8 | Poverty Bay | 8 | 3 | 0 | 5 | 237 | 257 | −20 | 6 | 2 | 20 |
| 9 | Horowhenua-Kapiti | 8 | 3 | 0 | 5 | 184 | 250 | −66 | 3 | 2 | 17 |
| 10 | King Country | 7 | 2 | 0 | 5 | 172 | 230 | −58 | 3 | 2 | 13 |
| 11 | Mid Canterbury | 8 | 1 | 1 | 6 | 161 | 236 | −75 | 2 | 2 | 10 |
| 12 | East Coast | 9 | 0 | 0 | 9 | 172 | 354 | −182 | 1 | 3 | 4 |

| Meads Cup qualification |
| Lochore Cup qualification |

In the case of two teams being tied on points, the ranking of teams is decided by:

- (1) the winner of the round robin match between the two provinces; then
- (2) highest point difference; then
- (3) most tries scored; then
- (4) a coin toss.

In the case of three or more teams being tied on points, the ranking of teams is decided by:

- (1) the province with the most wins against other tied provinces in the Round Robin; then
- (2) if two teams remain tied they shall be ranked according to the criteria listed above, but if more than two teams remain tied, they shall be ranked according to criteria (2) to (4) only.

== Regular season ==
The schedule of fixtures was confirmed on 25 February 2019.

=== Round 1 ===
24 August 2019
14:30 NZST

| Buller | 54–19 | East Coast |
| Try: James Lash (2); T. Manawatu (2); Robbie Malneek; Alex Paterson; Jack Best; Petaia Saukuru; Con: James Lash (7) | Report | Try: Hakarangi Tichborne (2); Mitchell Crosswell; Con: Zane King (2) |

Victoria Square, Westport
Referee: T Giffiths

24 August 2019
14:30 NZST

| Mid Canterbury | 10–17 | Horowhenua-Kapiti |
| Try: Seta Koroitamana; Josh McAtamney | Report | Try: Scott Cameron; Nardus Eramus; Con: Himiona Henare (2/2); Pen: Himiona Henare (1) |

Ashburton Showgrounds, Ashburton

24 August 2019
14:30 NZST

| South Canterbury | 20–26 | North Otago |
| Try: Siu Kakala (2); Nick Strachan; Con: Faalele Iosua (1); Pen: Faalele Iosua (1) | Report | Try: Melikisua Kolinisau; Howard Packman; Con: Robbie Smith (2/2); Pen: Robbie Smith (4) |

Fraser Park, Timaru
Referee: J Bredin

24 August 2019
14:30 NZST

| Thames Valley | 15–17 | Poverty Bay |
| Try: Kieran Lee (2); Danny Kayes | Report | Try: Riki Terekia; Andrew Tauatevalu (2); Con: Andrew Tauatevalu (1) |

Paeroa Domain, Paeroa
Referee: D Waenga

24 August 2019
14:30 NZST

| Wairarapa Bush | 28–18 | Wanganui |
| Try: Tristan Flutey; Sam Tufuga; Logan Hebenton-Prendeville; Con: Tipene Haira (2); Pen: Tipene Haira (3) | Report | Try: Roman Tutauha; Lindsay Horrocks; Con: Dane Whale (1); Pen: Dane Whale (1); Drop: Craig Clarke (1) |

Trust House Memorial Park, Masterton
Referee: M Winter

24 August 2019
14:30 NZST

| West Coast | 56–27 | King Country |
| Try: Josh Tomlinson (2); Boris van Bruchem; Dan Davis; Brad Tauwhare; Jesse Pitman-Joass; Nick Thomson; Jared Mitchell; Con: Todd Struthers (5); Pen: Todd Struthers (2) | Report | Try: Aletosio Tapili; Stephen Turner; Chulainn Mabbett-Sowerby; Bradly Jeffries; Con: Evann Reihana (2); Pen: Evann Reihana (1) |

Rugby Park, Greymouth
Referee: N Webster

=== Round 2 ===
30 August 2019
17:05 NZST

| North Otago | 25–11 | Wairarapa Bush |
| Try: Howard Packman; Samuel Tatupu; Lemi Masoe; Con: Robbie Smith (2/3); Pen: Robbie Smith (2) | Report | Try: Brock Price; Con: Tipene Haira (0/1); Pen: Tipene Haira (2) |

Forsyth Barr Stadium, Dunedin
Referee: S Curran

30 August 2019
19:30 NZST

| King Country | 34–12 | Buller |
| Try: Alefosio Tapili (2); Sisa Vosaki (2); Zayn Tipping; Con: Evaan Reihana (3); Pen: Evaan Reihana (1) | Report | Try: Gabba de Kock (2); Con: Timoti Manawatu (1) |

Owen Delany Park
Referee: H Reed

31 August 2019
14:30 NZST

| East Coast | 15–22 | Mid Canterbury |
| Try: Zac Guildford; Epeli Lotawa; Con: Zane King (1); Pen: Zane King (1) | Report | Try: Jon Dampney; Matt McAtamney; Manasa Bari; Con: Corey McKay (2); Pen: Corey McKay (1) |

Whakarua Park, Ruatoria

31 August 2019
14:30 NZST

| Horowhenua-Kapiti | 21–27 | West Coast |
| Try: Kane Tamou; Nathan Kendrick; Himiona Henare; Con: Codi Hemi (3/3) | Report | Try: Josh Tomlinson; Sam Lebezeit; Jesse Pitman-Joass; Con: Todd Struthers (3/3); Pen: Todd Struthers (1); Drop: Jesse Pitman-Joass (1) |

Horowhenua Community Trust Levin Domain, Levin
Referee: J Bredin

31 August 2019
14:30 NZST

| Poverty Bay | 29–40 | South Canterbury |
| Try: Adrian Wyrill (2); Ethan Reeves; Penalty try Con: Andrew Tauateluva (2/2); Pen: Andrew Tauateluva (1) | Report | Try: Brad Tunnicliffe (3); Clarence Moli (2); Zac Saunders; Con: Theo Davidson (2); Pen: Theo Davidson (1); Reilly Cormack (1) |

More FM Rugby Park, Gisborne
Referee: T Cottrell

31 August 2019
14:30 NZST

| Wanganui | 30–36 | Thames Valley |
| Try: Nick Harding; Roman Tutauha; Dane Whale; Shay Wiperi; Con: Nick Harding (2); Pen: Nick Harding (2) | Report | Try: Laulea Mau; Matiu Abraham; Jason Laurich; Pen: Regan Crosland (7) |

Cooks Gardens, Wanganui
Referee: Rebecca Mahoney

=== Round 3 ===
7 September 2019
14:30 NZST

| Buller | 22–21 | Wanganui |
| Try: A. Paterson; L. Ravudra; P. Saukuru; Con: James Lash (2); Pen: James Lash (1) | Report | Try: Scorers unknown |

Victoria Square, Westport
Referee: N Webster

7 September 2019
14:30 NZST

| Poverty Bay | 30–34 | North Otago |
| Try: Andrew Tauatevalu; Scott McKinley; Penalty try Con: Andrew Tauatevalu (2/2); Pen: Andrew Tauatevalu (3) | Report | Try: Michael Williams; Charles Elton; Clymont Gasca; Ralph Darling; Con: Robbie Smith (4/4); Pen: Robbie Smith (2) |

More FM Rugby Park, Gisborne
Referee: H Reed

7 September 2019
14:30 NZST

| South Canterbury | 57–7 | Horowhenua-Kapiti |
| Try: Tokomaata Fakatava; Cam Russell; Joel Smith; Kalavini Leatigaga; Clarence Moli; Zac Saunders; Solomone Iavaka; Penalty try Con: Willie Wright (6); Theo Davidson (1); Pen: Willie Wright (1) | Report | Try: Scorers unknown |

Fraser Park, Timaru
Referee: J Bredin

7 September 2019
14:30 NZST

| Thames Valley | 43–15 | East Coast |
| Try: Danny Kayes (2); Harry Lafituanai (2); Laulea Mau; Ben Bonnar; Bobby Motuliki; Con: Regan Crossland (3); Cole Berridge (1) | Report | Try: Tawhao Stewart; Hone Haerewa; Epeli Lotawa |

Paeroa Domain, Paeroa
Referee: A Mabey

7 September 2019
14:30 NZST

| Wairarapa Bush | 37–31 | King Country |
| Try: Tristan Flutey (2); Johan van Vliet; Ueta Tufuga; Brendon Campbell (2); Con: Tipene Haira (1); Tim Priest (1); Pen: Tipene Haira (1) | Report | Try: Brad Armstrong; Chulainn Mabbett-Sowerby; Alex Thrupp; Josh Balme; Tayne Tupaea; Con: Evaan Reihana (3) |

Trust House Memorial Park, Masterton
Referee: T Cottrell

7 September 2019
14:30 NZST

| West Coast | 43–41 | Mid Canterbury |
| Try: Sam Liebezeit (2); Troy Tauwhare; Sione Holani; Jared Mitchell; Logan Winter; Amenatave Tukana; Con: Todd Struthers (2); Sean McClure (1); Jesse Pitman-Joass (1) | Report | Try: Seta Koroitamana (2); Matt McAtamney; Manasa Bari (2); Jackson Donlan; Con: Corey McKay (4); Pen: Corey McKay (1) |

Rugby Park, Greymouth
Referee: J Munro

=== Round 4 ===
14 September 2019
14:30 NZST

| East Coast | 12–27 | King Country |

Whakarua Park, Ruatoria

14 September 2019
14:30 NZST

| Horowhenua-Kapiti | 31–46 | Buller |

Horowhenua Community Trust Levin Domain, Levin
Referee: N Hogan

14 September 2019
14:30 NZST

| Mid Canterbury | 13–13 | South Canterbury |

Ashburton Showgrounds, Ashburton
Referee: J Munro

14 September 2019
14:30 NZST

| North Otago | 22–21 | Thames Valley |

Whitestone Contracting Stadium, Oamaru
Referee: S Curran

14 September 2019
14:30 NZST

| Wairarapa Bush | 36–31 | Poverty Bay |

Trust House Memorial Park, Masterton
Referee: N Webster

14 September 2019
14:30 NZST

| Wanganui | 36–18 | West Coast |

Cooks Gardens, Wanganui
Referee: C Stone

=== Round 5 ===
21 September 2019
14:30 NZST

| King Country | 19–35 | Horowhenua-Kapiti |

Rugby Park, Te Kūiti

21 September 2019
14:30 NZST

| Poverty Bay | 52–38 | Mid Canterbury |

More FM Rugby Park, Gisborne
Referee: A Mabey

21 September 2019
14:30 NZST

| South Canterbury | 38–27 | Buller |

Fraser Park, Timaru
Referee: Rebecca Mahoney

21 September 2019
14:30 NZST

| Thames Valley | 29–23 | Wairarapa Bush |

Paeroa Domain, Paeroa
Referee: H Reed

21 September 2019
14:30 NZST

| Wanganui | 67–24 | East Coast |

Cooks Gardens, Wanganui
Referee: S Curran

21 September 2019
14:30 NZST

| West Coast | 17–18 | North Otago |

Rugby Park, Greymouth
Referee: J Bredin

=== Round 6 ===
28 September 2019
14:30 NZST

| Buller | 17–20 | Wairarapa Bush |

Victoria Square, Westport
Referee: S Curran

28 September 2019
14:30 NZST

| East Coast | 19–21 | West Coast |

Whakarua Park, Ruatoria
Referee: R Gordon

28 September 2019
14:30 NZST

| Horowhenua-Kapiti | 38–28 | Poverty Bay |

Waikanae Park, Waikanae
Referee: C Stone

28 September 2019
14:30 NZST

| King Country | 19–21 | South Canterbury |

Owen Delany Park
Referee: D MacPherson

28 September 2019
14:30 NZST

| Mid Canterbury | 17–31 | Thames Valley |

Ashburton Showgrounds, Ashburton
Referee: N Webster

28 September 2019
14:30 NZST

| North Otago | 22–27 | Wanganui |

Whitestone Contracting Stadium, Oamaru
Referee: T Cottrell

=== Round 7 ===
5 October 2019
14:30 NZST

| North Otago | 34–10 | Mid Canterbury |

Whitestone Contracting Stadium, Oamaru
Referee: C Paul

5 October 2019
14:30 NZST

| Poverty Bay | 24–20 | East Coast |

More FM Rugby Park, Gisborne
Referee: A Mabey

5 October 2019
14:30 NZST

| Thames Valley | 28–24 | South Canterbury |

Paeroa Domain, Paeroa
Referee: D MacPherson

5 October 2019
14:30 NZST

| Wairarapa Bush | 25–20 | Horowhenua-Kapiti |

Trust House Memorial Park, Masterton
Referee: R Gordon

5 October 2019
14:30 NZST

| Wanganui | 57–19 | King Country |

Cooks Gardens, Wanganui
Referee: V Ringrose

5 October 2019
14:30 NZST

| West Coast | 7–47 | Buller |

Rugby Park, Greymouth
Referee: M Playle

=== Round 8 ===
12 October 2019
14:30 NZST

| Buller | 36–26 | Poverty Bay |

Victoria Square, Westport
Referee: J Bredin

12 October 2019
14:30 NZST

| East Coast | 29–61 | North Otago |

Whakarua Park, Ruatoria
Referee: T Cottrell

12 October 2019
14:30 NZST

| Horowhenua-Kapiti | 15–38 | Wanganui |

Horowhenua Community Trust Levin Domain, Levin
Referee: N Hogan

12 October 2019
14:30 NZST

| King Country | 15–37 | Thames Valley |

Rugby Park, Te Kūiti
Referee: M Playle

12 October 2019
14:30 NZST

| Mid Canterbury | 10–31 | Wairarapa Bush |

Ashburton Showgrounds, Ashburton
Referee: D Moore

12 October 2019
14:30 NZST

| South Canterbury | 24–27 | West Coast |

Fraser Park, TImaru
Referee: T Griffiths

== Finals ==
Meads Cup semi-finals
1 | Thames Valley | 15
4 | Wanganui | 20
2 | North Otago | 27
3 | Wairarapa Bush | 25

Meads Cup final
4 | Wanganui | 19
2 | North Otago | 33

Lochore Cup semi-finals
5 | West Coast | 41
8 | Poverty Bay | 35
6 | Buller | 24
7 | South Canterbury | 56

Lochore Cup final
5 | West Coast | 19
7 | South Canterbury | 23

=== Semi-finals ===
19 October 2019
14:30 NZST

| Thames Valley | 15–20 | Wanganui |
| Pen: Reece Boughton (5) | | Try: Vereniki Tikoisolomone (2); Con: Nick Harding (2); Pen: Nick Harding (2) |

Paeroa Domain, Paeroa
Referee: Dan Waenga

19 October 2019
14:30 NZST

| North Otago | 27–25 | Wairarapa Bush |
| Try: Howard Packman (2), Hayden Tisdall, Meli Kolinisau; Con: Robbie Smith (2); Pen: Robbie Smith |

Whitestone Contracting Stadium
Referee: Tipene Cottrell

19 October 2019
14:30 NZST

| West Coast | 41–35 | Poverty Bay |

Greymouth
Referee: H Reed

19 October 2019
14:30 NZST

| Buller | 24–56 | South Canterbury |

Westport
Referee: N Webster

=== Finals ===
26 October 2019
14:30 NZST

| Wanganui | 19–33 | North Otago |

Oamaru
Referee: A Mabey

27 October 2019
14:30 NZST

| West Coast | 19–23 | South Canterbury |

Greymouth
Referee: T Cottrell

== Ranfurly Shield challenges ==
=== Pre-season challenges ===
For the 2019 preseason, Ranfurly Shield holders Otago saw challenges from the reigning 2018 Heartland Championship champions Thames Valley as well as neighbours North Otago.

13 July 2019
14:05 NZST

| Otago | 41–21 | Thames Valley |
| Try: Sekonaia Pole 40'; James Lentjes 45'; Ben Miller 52'; Aleki Morris 60'; Dylan Nel 71'; Slade McDowall 80'; Con: Ben Miller (4/6) 40', 52', 61', 72'; Faddes (0/1); Pen: Ben Miller (1/2) 78' | Report | Try: Harry Lafituanai (2) 29', 75'; Con: Reece Broughton (1/1) 30'; Cole Berridge (0/1); Pen: Reece Broughton (3/5) 8', 20', 48'; Cards: Lance Easton (yellow card) 44' |

Wanaka Showgrounds, Wānaka
Attendance: 3,500
Referee: Nick Webster (New Zealand)

26 July 2019
14:05 NZST

| Otago | 49–14 | North Otago |
| Try: Vilimoni Koroi 10' c Joshua Dickson 17' c Aleki Morris 37' c Jona Nareki 43' c R. Gouws 62' c S. Mau 72' c James Lentjes 77' c Con: Ash Moeke (7/7) 11', 18', 38', 44', 63', 73', 78'; Cards: Sio Tomkinson (yellow card) 27' | Report | Try: H. Packman 28' c M. Kolinisau 59' c Con: R. Smith (2/2) 29', 60' |

Whitestone Contracting Stadium, Oamaru
Referee: Rebecca Mahoney (New Zealand)

== See also ==
- Hanan Shield competed for by Mid Canterbury, North Otago and South Canterbury
- Rundle Cup played between Buller and West Coast
- New Zealand Heartland XV
- Ranfurly Shield 2010–2019
- 2019 Mitre 10 Cup
