= 2016 Heartland Championship =

- Date: 27 August 2016–29 October 2016
- Countries: New Zealand

Final positions
- Champions: Wanganui (Meads Cup); North Otago (Lochore Cup)
- Runner-up: Buller (Meads Cup); King Country (Lochore Cup)

Tournament statistics
- Matches played: 54

The 2016 Heartland Championship, known as the 2016 Mitre 10 Heartland Championship for sponsorship reasons, was the eleventh edition of the Heartland Championship, a rugby union competition involving the twelve amateur rugby unions in New Zealand. The tournament included a round-robin stage in which the twelve teams played eight games each and then the top four advanced to the Meads Cup semifinals, while fifth to eighth advanced to the Lochore Cup semifinals. In both of these knockout stages the top seeds (first and fifth) played at home against the lowest seeds (fourth and eighth), the second highest seeds (second and sixth) played at home against the third highest seeds (third and seventh) and the final had the higher seed play at home against the lower seed.

== Law changes ==
The New Zealand Rugby Union decided to implement new law changes for the Heartland Championship for 2016. These law changes involved a new points scoring system:

- 8 pts for a penalty try (no conversion kick required);
- 6 pts for a try;
- 2 pts for a penalty, conversion or drop goal.

== Teams ==
Locations of teams in the 2016 Heartland Championship

The 2016 Heartland Championship was contested by the following teams:

Team	Super Rugby partner	Hometown	Home stadium	Capacity
Buller	Crusaders	Westport	Victoria Square	5,000
East Coast	Hurricanes	Ruatoria	Whakarua Park	3,000
Horowhenua-Kapiti	Hurricanes	Levin	Levin Domain	6,500
King Country	Chiefs	Taupō	Owen Delany Park	20,000
Mid Canterbury	Crusaders	Ashburton	Ashburton Showgrounds	5,000
North Otago	Highlanders	Oamaru	Whitestone Contracting Stadium	7,000
Poverty Bay	Hurricanes	Gisborne	More FM Rugby Park	18,000
South Canterbury	Crusaders	Timaru	Fraser Park	12,000
Thames Valley	Chiefs	Paeroa	Paeroa Domain	3,000
Wairarapa Bush	Hurricanes	Masterton	Trust House Memorial Park	10,000
Wanganui	Hurricanes	Wanganui	Cooks Gardens	15,000
West Coast	Crusaders	Greymouth	Rugby Park	6,000

== Ranfurly Shield challenges ==
Three Heartland Championship teams, Thames Valley, King Country and Wanganui challenged Waikato for the coveted Ranfurly Shield. Thames Valley last challenged for the Ranfurly Shield in 2014 against Counties Manukau (losing 68–0), whereas both King Country and Wanganui last challenged for it in 2012 against Taranaki (losing 67–16 and 51–7, respectively).

The first challenge came from Thames Valley in June, when the Swamp Foxes succumbed 83–13 to Waikato. In July the holders retained their Shield in a 55-to-nothing victory against King Country. The last Heartland Championship challenge for 2016 saw Waikato defeat Wanganui 32–12 in Cambridge.

6 June 2016

Thames Valley	13–83	Waikato
Try: Brett Ranga; Jone Koroinsagana; Pen: Josh O'Flaherty	Report	Try: Iliesa Tavuyara (3); Whetu Douglas (2); Atu Moli (2); Latu Talakai; Jake Ale; Jason Robertson; Hame Faiva; Sevu Reece; Murray Iti; Con: Jason Robertson (6); Matt Lansdown (3)

Paeroa Domain, Paeroa

30 July 2016
14:35 (NZST)

King Country	0–55	Waikato
	Report	Try: Brian Alainu'uese 11'; Hame Faiva (2); Jordan Trainor; Murray Iti 47'; Sevu Reece 74'; Matt Lansdown 78'; Tevita Taufuʻi 80'; Con: Jordan Trainor (6); Pen: Jordan Trainor

Bedford Park, Matamata

6 August 2016
14:35 (NZST)

Waikato	32–12	Wanganui
Try: Iliesa Tavuyara; Tevita Taufuʻi; Jordan Trainor (2); Whetu Douglas; Steven Misa; Con: Jordan Trainor	Report	Try: Gavin Thornbury; Jamie Hughes; Con: Dane Whale

Memorial Park, Cambridge

== Standings ==
Pos.	Team	Pld	W	D	L	PF	PA	PD	TB	LB	Pts
1	Wanganui	8	8	0	0	362	110	+252	6	0	38
2	South Canterbury	8	7	0	1	324	162	+162	7	1	36
3	Buller	8	6	0	2	258	190	+68	5	1	30
4	Wairarapa Bush	8	6	0	2	240	174	+66	4	2	30
5	Mid Canterbury	8	5	0	3	278	198	+80	6	1	27
6	King Country	8	4	2	2	236	170	+66	4	1	25
7	Poverty Bay	8	3	0	5	296	268	+28	6	2	20
8	North Otago	8	2	2	4	230	246	−16	5	1	18
9	Horowhenua-Kapiti	8	2	1	5	224	260	−36	4	1	15
10	West Coast	8	2	0	6	188	400	−212	3	0	11
11	Thames Valley	8	0	1	7	158	324	−166	1	2	5
12	East Coast	8	0	0	8	166	458	−292	2	1	3

Meads Cup qualification
Lochore Cup qualification

In the case of a two-team tie on points the ranking of teams is decided by:
- (1) the winner of the round robin match between the two provinces; then
- (2) highest point difference; then
- (3) most tries scored; then
- (4) a coin toss.

In the caseof a three-team or more tie on points the ranking of teams is decided by:

- (1) the province with the most wins against other tied provinces in the Round Robin; then
- (2) if two teams remain tied they shall be ranked according to the criteria listed above, but if more than two teams remain tied, they shall be ranked according to criteria (2) to (4) only.

== Regular season ==
The schedule of fixtures was confirmed on 1 March 2016.

=== Round 1 ===
27 August 2016
14:00 (NZST)

Thames Valley	30–34	Horowhenua-Kapiti
Try: John Hale; Lance Easton; Norman Solofa; Jonnie Te Ruki-Chambers; Con: Jonnie Te Ruki-Chambers (2); Pen: Jonnie Te Ruki-Chambers	Report	Try: Fa'afoi Ioapo; Ryan Shelford; Andrew Lima; Perry Hayman; Con: Perry Hayman (3); Pen: Perry Hayman (2)

Paeroa Domain, Paeroa

27 August 2016
14:30 (NZST)

Mid Canterbury	40–32	North Otago
Try: Jarred Percival (2); Jon Dampney; Brendon Rigden; Timoci Nabakeke; Mike Lynch; Con: Jarred Percival (2/6)	Report	Try: Shay Tucker; Josh Casey; Joe Pickett; Simon Lilicama; Con: Carey (2/4)

Ashburton Showgrounds, Ashburton

27 August 2016
14:30 (NZST)

Poverty Bay	54–30	East Coast
Try: Isaia Vuki; Everard Reid; Devonte Stuart; Ken Houkamau; Siosiua Moala; Tamati Samuels; Con: Isaia Vuki (3); Pen: Isaia Vuki (2)	Report	Try: Scorers not provided

Rugby Park, Gisborne

27 August 2016
14:30 (NZST)

South Canterbury	28–26	Buller
Try: Raitube Vasurakuta; Max Morris; Viliame Rogatavu; Kieran Coll; Con: Zac Southern (2)	Report	Try: Setafano Sauqaqa; David Egelstaff; James Lash; Con: James Lash (2); Pen: James Lash (2)

Fraser Park, Timaru

27 August 2016
14:30 (NZST)

Wairarapa Bush	16–18	King Country
Try: James Googer; Richard Puddy; Con: Tim Priest (1/2); Pen: Tim Priest	Report	Try: Stephan Turner; Sean Wanden; Con: Zayn Tipping (2/2); Pen: Zayn Tipping

Memorial Park, Masterton

27 August 2016
14:30 (NZST)

Wanganui	74–6	West Coast
Try: Michael Nabuliwaqe (3); Malakai Volau; Roman Tutauha; Te Rangatira Waitokia (2); Gavin Thornbury; Cole Baldwin; Bryn Hudson; Con: Dane Whale (7)	Report	Try: Trent Reti

Cooks Gardens, Whanganui

=== Round 2 ===
3 September 2016
14:30 (NZST)

Buller	34–32	Mid Canterbury
Try: James Lash; Anthony Tailua; Joshua Tuidriva; Dan Hytongue; Con: James Lash (4/4); Drop: James Lash 80'	Report	Try: Logan Bonnington; Jarred Percival; Mike Lynch; Timoci Nabakeke; Con: Jarred Percival (4/4)

Victoria Square, Westport

3 September 2016
14:30 (NZST)

East Coast	8–74	Wanganui
Try: BJ Sidney; Con: Todd Dolan (1/1)	Report	Try: Simon Dibben (2); Kameli Kuruyabaki; Cole Baldwin; Tremaine Gilbert; Gavin Thornbury; Te Rangitira Waitokia (2); Craig Clare; Ace Malo; Con: Dane Whalen (5); Steve Crosbie (2)

Whakarua Park, Ruatoria

3 September 2016
15:05 (NZST)

Horowhenua-Kapiti	22–32	Wairarapa Bush
Try: Tyson Maki; Penalty try Con: Perry Hayman (1/1); Pen: Perry Hayman (2); Warwick Lahmert	Report	Try: Andrew Smith; James Goodger; Zac Guildford; Sam Monaghan; Con: Tim Priest (2); Pen: Tim Priest (2)

Wellington Regional Stadium, Wellington

3 September 2016
14:30 (NZST)

King Country	30–24	Poverty Bay
Try: Sam Mason; Kieron Robinson; Ralulu Bovau; Zayn Tipping; Con: Zayn Tipping (2); Pen: Zayn Tipping	Report	Try: Les Hills; Tani Misikosi; Ratu Daurua; Con: Isaia Vuki (2); Pen: Isaia Vuki (2)

Owen Delany Park, Taupō

3 September 2016
14:30 (NZST)

North Otago	30–22	Thames Valley
Try: Ralph Darling; Josh Casey; Matt Posea; Lemi Masoe; Con: Josh Casey (3)	Report	Try: Jonnie Te Ruki-Chambers; Rupeni Vakacugu; Hayden Wisnoski; Con: Hayden Wisnoski (2)

Centennial Park, Oamaru

3 September 2016
14:30 (NZST)

West Coast	20–58	South Canterbury
Try: Troy Tauwhare; Maleli Mudu; Logan Winter; Con: Nik Cumming (1)	Report	Try: Viliame Logavatu (2); Mosese Aho; John Dyer; Raitube Vasurakuta; Max Morris; Kieran Coll; Shay Moseby; Con: Zac Southern (5)

Rugby Park, Greymouth

=== Round 3 ===
10 September 2016
14:00 (NZST)

Thames Valley	22–22	King Country

Boyd Park, Te Aroha

10 September 2016
14:30 (NZST)

Mid Canterbury	16–26	Wairarapa Bush

Ashburton Showgrounds, Ashburton

10 September 2016
14:30 (NZST)

North Otago	36–36	Horowhenua-Kapiti

Forsyth Barr Stadium, Dunedin

10 September 2016
14:30 (NZST)

Poverty Bay	18–30	Buller

Rugby Park, Gisborne

10 September 2016
14:30 (NZST)

Wanganui	32–30	South Canterbury

Cooks Gardens, Whanganui

10 September 2016
14:30 (NZST)

West Coast	36–30	East Coast

Rugby Park, Greymouth

=== Round 4 ===
17 September 2016
14:30 (NZST)

Buller	48–0	West Coast

Victoria Square, Westport

17 September 2016
14:30 (NZST)

East Coast	8–48	North Otago

Whakarua Park, Ruatoria

17 September 2016
14:30 (NZST)

Horowhenua-Kapiti	26–42	Mid Canterbury

Levin Domain, Levin

17 September 2016
14:30 (NZST)

King Country	10–22	Wanganui

Rugby Park, Te Kūiti

17 September 2016
14:30 (NZST)

South Canterbury	52–28	Poverty Bay

Fraser Park, Timaru

17 September 2016
18:00 (NZST)

Wairarapa Bush	28–18	Thames Valley

Memorial Park, Masterton

=== Round 5 ===
24 September 2016
14:00 (NZST)

Thames Valley	16–62	South Canterbury

Paeroa Domain, Paeroa

24 September 2016
14:30 (NZST)

Buller	54–22	East Coast

Victoria Square, Westport

24 September 2016
14:30 (NZST)

Horowhenua-Kapiti	18–42	King Country

Levin Domain, Levin

24 September 2016
14:30 (NZST)

Mid Canterbury	34–22	West Coast

Ashburton Showgrounds, Ashburton

24 September 2016
14:30 (NZST)

North Otago	22–38	Wairarapa Bush

Centennial Park, Oamaru

24 September 2016
14:30 (NZST)

Poverty Bay	30–52	Wanganui

Rugby Park, Gisborne

=== Round 6 ===
1 October 2016
14:30 (NZDT)

East Coast	22–76	Mid Canterbury

Whakarua Park, Ruatoria

1 October 2016
14:30 (NZDT)

King Country	4–4	North Otago

Rugby Park, Te Kūiti

1 October 2016
14:30 (NZDT)

South Canterbury	36–24	Horowhenua-Kapiti

Fraser Park, Timaru

1 October 2016
14:30 (NZDT)

Wairarapa Bush	24–26	Buller

Memorial Park, Masterton

1 October 2016
14:30 (NZDT)

Wanganui	60–14	Thames Valley

Cooks Gardens, Whanganui

1 October 2016
14:30 (NZDT)

West Coast	28–62	Poverty Bay

Rugby Park, Greymouth

=== Round 7 ===
8 October 2016
14:30 (NZDT)

Buller	0–28	Wanganui

Victoria Square, Westport

8 October 2016
14:30 (NZDT)

East Coast	24–72	King Country

Whakarua Park, Ruatoria

8 October 2016
14:30 (NZDT)

Horowhenua-Kapiti	52–22	West Coast

Levin Domain, Levin

8 October 2016
14:30 (NZDT)

Mid Canterbury	38–22	Thames Valley

Ashburton Showgrounds, Ashburton

8 October 2016
14:30 (NZDT)

North Otago	16–44	South Canterbury

Centennial Park, Oamaru

8 October 2016
14:30 (NZDT)

Poverty Bay	30–32	Wairarapa Bush

Rugby Park, Gisborne

=== Round 8 ===
15 October 2016
14:00 (NZDT)

Thames Valley	14–50	Poverty Bay

Paeroa Domain, Paeroa

15 October 2016
14:30 (NZDT)

King Country	38–40	Buller

Owen Delany Park, Taupō

15 October 2016
14:30 (NZDT)

South Canterbury	14–0	Mid Canterbury

Fraser Park, Timaru

15 October 2016
14:30 (NZDT)

Wanganui	20–12	Horowhenua-Kapiti

Cooks Gardens, Whanganui

15 October 2016
14:30 (NZDT)

West Coast	54–42	North Otago

Rugby Park, Greymouth

15 October 2016
18:00 (NZDT)

Wairarapa Bush	44–22	East Coast

Memorial Park, Masterton

== Finals ==
Meads Cup semi-finals
1	Wanganui	58
4	Wairarapa Bush	26
2	South Canterbury	6
3	Buller	16

Meads Cup final
1	Wanganui	20
3	Buller	18

Lochore Cup semi-finals
1	Mid Canterbury	24
4	North Otago	36
2	King Country	48
3	Poverty Bay	26

Lochore Cup final
2	King Country	22
4	North Otago	44

=== Semifinals ===
Meads Cup

22 October 2016
14:30 (NZST)

Wanganui	58–26	Wairarapa Bush

Cooks Gardens, Whanganui

22 October 2016
14:30 (NZST)

South Canterbury	6–16	Buller

Fraser Park, Timaru

Lochore Cup

22 October 2016
14:30 (NZST)

Mid Canterbury	24–36	North Otago

Ashburton Showgrounds, Ashburton

22 October 2016
14:30 (NZST)

King Country	48–26	Poverty Bay

Rugby Park, Te Kūiti

=== Finals ===
Meads Cup

29 October 2016

Wanganui	20–18	Buller

Lochore Cup

29 October 2016

King Country	22–44	North Otago

== See also ==
- Hanan Shield competed for by Mid Canterbury, North Otago and South Canterbury
- Rundle Cup played between Buller and West Coast
- New Zealand Heartland XV
- Ranfurly Shield 2010–2019
- 2016 Mitre 10 Cup
