= Brett Harvey =

Brett Harvey may refer to:

- Brett Harvey (Canadian director), Canadian director, writer and cinematographer
- Brett Harvey (English director), English film writer and director
- Brett Harvey (rugby union), former New Zealand rugby union player
