= Ross Hay =

- Born: Ross Hay; 27 February 1980 (age 46) Oamaru, New Zealand
- Height: 1.75 m (5 ft 9 in)
- Weight: 85 kg (13 st 5 lb)

Rugby union career
- Position: Flanker
Senior career
Years	Team	Apps	(Points)
	North Otago	126	
International career
Years	Team	Apps	(Points)
- NZ Heartland XV
–	NZ Divisional XV		

Ross Hay is a New Zealand rugby union player currently playing for the Heartland Championship team North Otago.
