= Phil Gard =

New Zealand rugby player (1947–1990)

- Born: Philip Charles Gard; 20 November 1947 Kurow, New Zealand
- Died: 3 June 1990 (aged 42) Kurow, New Zealand
- Height: 1.78 m (5 ft 10 in)
- Weight: 80 kg (180 lb)
- School: Kurow District High School

Rugby union career
- Position: Second-five eighth, centre
Provincial / State sides
Years	Team	Apps	(Points)
1966–77	North Otago	85	
1969–72	South Island	4	
International career
Years	Team	Apps	(Points)
1971–72	New Zealand	1	(0)

Philip Charles Gard (20 November 1947 – 3 June 1990) was a New Zealand rugby union player who played for North Otago, and New Zealand. Gard played 85 matches for North Otago throughout 12 consecutive seasons. His brother, Neville also played for North Otago in 1962.

== Early career ==
Gard made his debut on the wing for North Otago in 1966, aged 18. Three years later, in 1969, he played in the national under-23 trials, and made the first of his four appearances for the South Island side that defeated the North Island at Athletic Park that year.

== All Blacks ==
In 1970, Gard played in his first All Black trial but was not selected to tour South Africa that year. He also appeared again in the under-23 trials, and for the South Island. In 1971, he was called into the national side at second five-eighth after a strong performance for the combined Hanan Shield unions team against the touring British Lions. The fourth test against the Lions at Eden Park was his only international appearance for the All Blacks, although he played six matches on the internal tour in 1972. He played in the trials for the end-of-year tour of Britain, Ireland and France, but was not selected.

== Later career ==
Gard continued playing for North Otago until his retirement in 1977, having made 85 appearances for the union. He served as a committee member and president of the Kurow club, but died from cancer in 1990.
