= Ngati Porou East Coast Rugby Football Union =

NZ rugby union club, based in Ruatoria

Ngāti Porou East Coast Rugby Football Union
- Nickname: Ngāti Porou East Coast
- Founded: 1921
- Location: Ruatoria
- Ground: Whakarua Park (Capacity: 3,000)
- Chairman: (New Zealand) Val Morrison
- Coach: (New Zealand) Hosea Gear
- League: Heartland Championship
Team kit

Official website
- www.npec.co.nz

The Ngāti Porou East Coast Rugby Football Union (NPEC) is a constituent union in the New Zealand Rugby Union located on the East Coast of the North Island. Its provincial team plays in the Heartland Championship and its home ground is Whakarua Park, Ruatoria. It is the smallest Union in New Zealand in the sense of player numbers and population base.

The union was previously called East Coast. Due to the high number of players from the Ngāti Porou iwi, the team became known as Ngāti Porou East Coast and in August 2023 the Union was officially renamed the Ngāti Porou East Coast Rugby Football Union on the New Zealand incorporated societies register.

== History ==
The East Coast Rugby Football Union was formed in 1922 when they split from the Poverty Bay Rugby Football Union.

East Coast won the 2012 Heartland Championship Meads Cup defeating Wanganui 29–27 at Whakarua Park on 27 October 2012., In the 2022 Heartland Championship the team won the Lochore Cup beating Mid Canterbury by 25 to 20. They become the 6th team to have won both the Meads Cup and the Lochore Cup.

The team is renowned for losing 54 consecutive games over eight years. However former All Blacks Ma’a Nonu and Hosea Gear were involved in the side when they broke that drought in a 50-26 win over Buller in October 2021.

== Clubs ==
Ngāti Porou East Coast Rugby Football Union is made up of 10 clubs:

- Hicks Bay
- Hikurangi Sports Club
- Ruatoria City Sports Club
- Tawhiti
- Tokararangi
- Tokomaru Bay United
- Tihirau Victory Club (TVC)
- Uawa Sports
- Waiapu
- Waima

=== Club champions ===
Rangiora Keelan Memorial Shield

- 2022 - Tihirau Victory Club (TVC) 39 - 17 Waiapu
- 2023 - Hicks Bay 13 - 7 TVC
- 2024 - Waiapu 19 - 18 Ruatoria City
- 2025 - TVC 19 - 12 Waiapu
- 2026 - Tokararangi 32 - 21 Uawa

== National Provincial Championship ==
East Coast won the NPC 3rd Division twice. Firstly in 1999 defeating Poverty Bay 18–15 in the final at Ruatoria. Secondly and possibly even more impressively, defeating North Otago the following year in front of their home crowd at Oamaru in a come-from-behind 25–21 victory to record back to back NPC 3rd Division Championships.

=== 1999 NPC 3rd Division champions ===
Round	Comp	Home team	Score	Away team	Score
Week 1	NPC	Buller	18	East Coast	36
Week 2	NPC	West Coast	41	East Coast	13
Week 3	NPC	Wairarapa Bush	15	East Coast	31
Week 4	NPC	East Coast	10	Poverty Bay	15
Week 5	NPC	East Coast	30	North Otago	9
Week 6	NPC	Horowhenua-Kapiti	20	East Coast	14
Week 7	NPC	East Coast	74	Buller	8
Week 8	NPC	East Coast	18	South Canterbury	6
Semi Final	NPC	Horowhenua-Kapiti	20	East Coast	21
Final	NPC	East Coast	18	Poverty Bay	15

- Overall Season standing: Champions

=== 2000 NPC 3rd Division champions ===
Round	Comp	Home team	Score	Away team	Score
Week 1	NPC	East Coast	20	South Canterbury	14
Week 2	NPC	North Otago	26	East Coast	26
Week 3	NPC	Buller	12	East Coast	44
Week 4	NPC	South Canterbury	12	East Coast	6
Week 5	NPC	East Coast	33	Wairarapa Bush	20
Week 6	NPC	Poverty Bay	28	East Coast	30
Week 7	NPC	East Coast	33	West Coast	27
Week 8	NPC	East Coast	31	Horowhenua-Kapiti	30
Semi Final	NPC	East Coast	18	Wairarapa Bush	17
Final	NPC	North Otago	21	East Coast	25

- Overall Season standing: Champions

== Heartland Championship ==
=== Heartland Championship placings ===
Heartland Championship Results
Year	Pld	W	D	L	PF	PA	PD	BP	Pts	Place	Playoffs		
Year	Pld	W	D	L	PF	PA	PD	BP	Pts	Place	Qual	Semifinal	Final
2006	8	1	0	7	111	244	−133	2	6	11th	No	—	
2007	8	2	0	6	130	210	−70	3	11	11th	No	—	
2008	8	0	0	8	50	306	−256	0	0	12th	No	—	
2009	8	1	0	7	87	337	−250	0	4	11th	No	—	
2010	8	0	0	8	96	384	−288	1	1	12th	No	—	
2011	8	6	0	2	189	198	−9	3	27	3rd	Meads Cup	Won 23–17 against North Otago	Lost 10–30 to Wanganui
2012	8	7	0	1	230	177	+53	3	31	1st	Meads Cup	Won 26–15 against North Otago	Won 29–27 against Wanganui
2013	8	2	0	6	173	225	−52	5	13	10th	No	—	
2014	8	0	0	8	67	367	−300	0	0	12th	No	—	
2015	8	0	0	8	112	368	−256	2	2	12th	No	—	
2016	8	0	0	8	166	458	−292	3	3	12th	No	—	
2017	8	0	0	8	98	353	−255	0	0	12th	No	—	
2018	8	0	0	8	99	447	−348	2	2	12th	No	—	
2019	8	0	0	8	153	319	−166	0	0	12th	No	—	
2021	8	3	0	5	242	258	−16	8	20	8th	No	—	
2022	8	4	0	4	155	242	−87	2	18	7th	Lochore Cup	Won 37-30 against Horowhenua-Kapiti	Won 25-20 against Mid Canterbury
2023	8	5	0	3	222	183	+39	7	27	4th	Meads Cup	Lost 17-34 to South Canterbury	—
2024	8	4	0	4	212	236	-24	4	20	7th	Lochore Cup	Lost 31-34 to King Country	—
2025	8	0	0	8	112	470	−358	1	1	12th	No	—	
2026	8	1	0	7	226	430	−204	4	8	11th	No	—	

There was no Heartland Championship in the 2020 season due to Covid-19 restrictions.

=== 2012 Meads Cup winners ===
Round	Home team	Score	Away team	Score
Week 1	Ngāti Porou East Coast	23	West Coast	16
Week 2	South Canterbury	37	Ngāti Porou East Coast	9
Week 3	Ngāti Porou East Coast	20	Buller	18
Week 4	Mid Canterbury	13	Ngāti Porou East Coast	20
Week 5	Ngāti Porou East Coast	25	Wanganui	17
Week 6	Thames Valley	38	Ngāti Porou East Coast	53
Week 7	Ngāti Porou East Coast	56	King Country	24
Week 8	Poverty Bay	14	Ngāti Porou East Coast	24
Semi Final	Ngāti Porou East Coast	26	North Otago	15
Final	Ngāti Porou East Coast	29	Wanganui	27

- Overall Season standing: Champions

== Ranfurly Shield ==
Ngāti Porou East Coast has challenged for the Ranfurly Shield eight times losing heavily on each occasion.

=== Matches ===
1953	Wellington	42–0	East Coast	Wellington
1968	Hawke's Bay	31–0	East Coast	Napier
1981	Waikato	54–0	East Coast	Hamilton
1987	Auckland	72–0	East Coast	Auckland
1997	Auckland	115–6	East Coast	Ruatoria
2002	Canterbury	51–6	East Coast	Christchurch
2013	Waikato	65–10	East Coast	Ruatoria
2021	Hawke's Bay	93–5	East Coast	Napier

== All Blacks ==
Six All Blacks have played rugby for East Coast:

- Hosea Gear
- Rico Gear
- Zac Guildford
- Andy Jefferd
- George Nēpia
- Ma'a Nonu

== Super Rugby ==
Ngāti Porou East Coast along with Waikato, Counties Manukau, King Country, Bay of Plenty, Taranaki, and Thames Valley make up the Chiefs Super Rugby region. Ngāti Porou East Coast was formerly part of the Hurricanes from 1996 until February 2025 where they announced their change of allegiance to the Chiefs.
