= Steven Sasagi =

Stephen Sasagi
- Born: Stephen Sasagi; 9 April 1985 (age 41) New Zealand
- Height: 1.92 m (6 ft 4 in)
- Weight: 111 kg (17 st 7 lb)

Rugby union career
- Position: Wing
Amateur team(s)
| Years | Team | Apps | (Points) |
| 2002 | Otago Boys High School | | |
| 2004-2007 | Alhambra Union | | |
| 2009- | Tawa | | |
Senior career
| Years | Team | Apps | (Points) |
| 2007 | North Otago | 9 | (35) |
| 2008 | Tasman | 2 | (5) |
International career
| Years | Team | Apps | (Points) |
- Samoan U-21

Stephen Sasagi is a NZ rugby union player who in the past has played for the Tasman Makos in the Air New Zealand Cup and North Otago in the Heartland Championship.

== Early years ==
Stephen Sasagi played for his Otago Boys High School 1st XV as a Lock in 2002. While playing his club rugby for Alhambra Union (2004–2007) he was selected for the Samoa U21 side to play in the Under 21 World Cup in Argentina and was part of the Under-21 team that faced Ireland in 2005.

== North Otago ==
Stephen Sasagi played on the wing when playing for North Otago and was a vital part of the 2007 North Otago side that won the Meads Cup. He brought pace to the team, and scored a number of tries along the way.

== Tasman Makos ==
Stephen Sasagi joined the Makos for the 2008 season. Although he only had two appearances, he managed to score his sole try for the union against Taranaki.

== Wellington ==
He attended Victoria University of Wellington at the School of Architecture and Design and studied a Bachelor of Design. Sasagi played as a Loose forward for the Tawa Rugby Club in the Wellington Club Competition.
