= Mike McCool =

New Zealand rugby union player (1951–2020)

- Born: Michael John McCool; 15 September 1951 Hastings, New Zealand
- Died: 23 June 2020 (aged 68)
- Height: 1.93 m (6 ft 4 in)
- Weight: 108 kg (238 lb)
- School: St. Patrick's College, Silverstream

Rugby union career
- Position: Lock
Provincial / State sides
Years	Team	Apps	(Points)
1972–78	Hawke's Bay	77	(0)
1979–83	Wairarapa Bush	50	(4)
International career
Years	Team	Apps	(Points)
1979	New Zealand	1	(0)

Michael John McCool (15 September 1951 – 23 June 2020) was a New Zealand rugby union player. A lock, McCool attended Kererū School, and then St. Patrick's College, Silverstream, where he was a member of the 1st XV in 1968.

He represented Hawke's Bay and Wairarapa Bush at a provincial level, and was a member of the New Zealand national side, the All Blacks, in 1979. He played two matches for the All Blacks, including one test match against Australia.

McCool died while working on his family lifestyle property in the Auckland region on 23 June 2020, survived by his wife, Deb, and four of their five children.
