= Robbie McLean =

New Zealand rugby union player

- Born: Robert John McLean; 23 May 1960 (age 66) Hāwera, New Zealand
- Height: 1.82 m (6 ft 0 in)
- Weight: 109 kg (240 lb)
- School: Tararua College
- Occupation: Farrier

Rugby union career
- Position: Prop
Provincial / State sides
Years	Team	Apps	(Points)
1987–1989	Wairarapa Bush	32	
1990–1992	Manawatu	25	
International career
Years	Team	Apps	(Points)
1987	New Zealand	0	(0)

Robert John McLean (born 23 May 1960) is a former New Zealand rugby union player. A prop, McLean represented Wairarapa Bush and Manawatu at a provincial level, and was a member of the New Zealand national side, the All Blacks, in 1987. He played two matches for the All Blacks on the tour of Japan that year, but did not play any internationals.
