= Fepikou Tatafu =

Tongan rugby union player

- Born: Fepikou Tatafu; 12 March 1975 (age 51) Tonga

Rugby union career
- Position(s): Centre, Wing
Amateur team(s)
Years	Team	Apps	(Points)
- Old Boys
–	Maheno		
Senior career
Years	Team	Apps	(Points)
1996-2000	Fasi Ma'ufanga		
2006-2007	Saint Nazaire	16	(5)
Provincial / State sides
Years	Team	Apps	(Points)
2001-2003	North Otago	22	(60)
International career
Years	Team	Apps	(Points)
1996-2002	Tonga	23	(50)

Fepikou Tatafu (born 12 March 1975) is a Tongan former rugby union player. He played as wing and centre.

== Career ==
Tatafu was first capped for Tonga during a test match against Fiji, on 27 July 1996, in Nuku'alofa. He also was part of the Tongan roster for the 1999 Rugby World Cup, playing two matches in the tournament. Tatafu last played for Tonga during a test against Papua New Guinea, on 7 December 2002, in Nuku'alofa. At club level, he played the National Provincial Championship for North Otago and later, he moved in France to play for Saint Nazaire Rugby Loire-Atlantique in Fédérale 1.
