= Ian Smith (rugby union, born 1941) =

NZ international rugby union player

Ian “Spooky” Smith
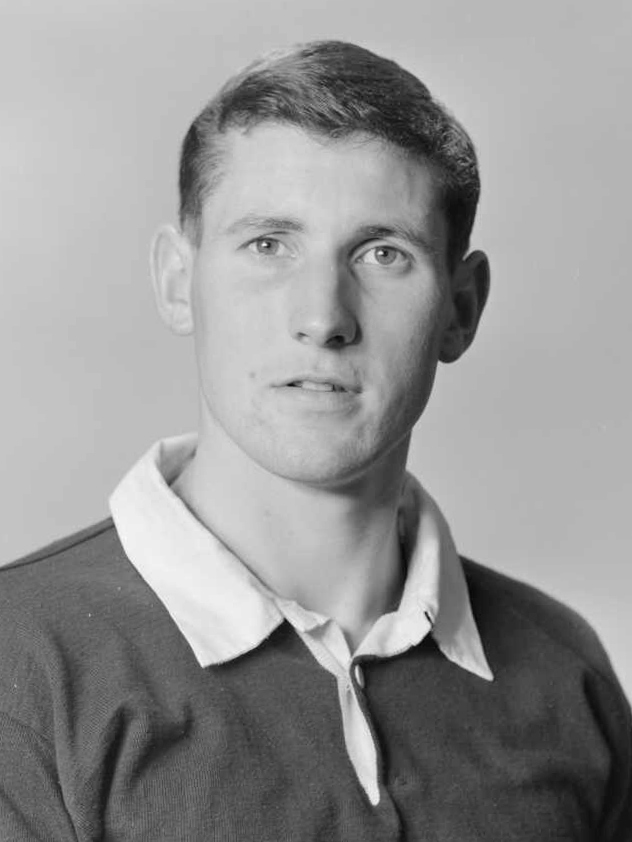
- Smith in 1963
- Born: Ian Stanley Talbot Smith; 20 August 1941 Dunedin, New Zealand
- Died: 29 September 2017 (aged 76) Nelson, New Zealand
- Height: 1.80 m (5 ft 11 in)
- Weight: 82 kg (181 lb)
- School: King's High School

Rugby union career
- Position: Wing
Provincial / State sides
Years	Team	Apps	(Points)
1961–64	Otago	37	
1965–66	North Otago	12	
1966–67	Southland	18	
International career
Years	Team	Apps	(Points)
1963–66	New Zealand	9	(6)

Ian Stanley Talbot Smith (20 August 1941 – 29 September 2017) was an international New Zealand rugby union player who had several seasons in All Blacks test sides during the 1960s. Smith was chosen for the Otago provincial side for the first time in 1961. During those years Smith played mainly as a centre. Smith was part of the South Island team who had a surprise win against the North Island in 1963.

== Representatives ==
In the 1963 trial Smith was switched to the wing and he ended up scoring two tries to beat Don McKay who had played against England earlier in the season. Smith got picked for the All Blacks because of his strength and direct running near the goalline. Smith was the left wing understudy of Ralph Caulton and did not appear in any of the five internationals. But he did score eight tries in 15 matches.

=== Colts/Under 23s ===
Smith toured Australia in 1964 with a team called New Zealand Colts, which was an under 23 team.

=== 1964 ===
1964 saw Smith make his test debut against the touring Wallabies when he played in all three Bledisloe Cup matches, and he appears for the second time in an interisland match. This took his appearances for Otago to 37, but he then moved to represent North Otago for 12 matches in 1965–66 followed by Southland's 18 in 1966–68.

=== Touring Springboks ===
In 1965 whilst playing for North Otago the Springboks were touring in New Zealand and Smith was chosen to captain the combined North Otago, South Canterbury and Mid Canterbury team against Springboks, when he played three tests. Although replaced for the third by Malcolm Dick, he returned for the fourth scoring two tries (his only test tries) in the 20–3 win.

He played the first three tests in 1966 against the British Lions but Malcolm Dick had returned from injury so Smith was dropped for the fourth test. In 1967 he attended the trials for the Britain and France tour but in his second match his team was thrashed 37–0 and like many of his teammates, he was overlooked in the final selection. In 1968 he played in his last major game for Southland who only just lost to France 8–6.

== Personal life ==
Smith was born to George and Noelie Smith (née Talbot). He had two sisters, Christine and Jacquetta. Smith was married to Jennifer Margaret "Jenny" Smith, who died in 2015; they had four sons: Gareth, Hamish, Tim and Matthew.
