= Mid Canterbury Rugby Football Union =

Mid Canterbury

Club information
- Full name: Mid Canterbury Rugby Football Union
- Colours: Green and Yellow
- Founded: 1904
- Website: www.midcanterburyrugby.co.nz

Current details
- Ground: Ashburton Showgrounds
- Competition: Heartland Championship

The Mid Canterbury Rugby Football Union (MCRFU) is a rugby province in the South Island of New Zealand.

== History ==
The Mid Canterbury Rugby Football Union was formed in 1904 as Ashburton Country, first as a sub-union of the South Canterbury Rugby Football Union and then of the Canterbury Rugby Football Union. The union gained full status in 1927, and changed its name to Mid Canterbury in 1952.

== Clubs ==
Mid Canterbury Rugby Football Union is made up of 9 clubs:

- Allenton
- Celtic
- Collegiate
- Hampstead
- Methven
- Mount Somers
- Rakaia
- Southern
- Tinwald

=== Senior Club champions ===
The Watters Cup champions in recent years were:

- 2026 - Rakaia 27-26 Methven
- 2025 - Celtic 24-23 Southern
- 2024 - Southern 25-21 Methven
- 2023 - Celtic 30-22 Methven
- 2022 - Methven 45-18 Southern

== Provincial representative rugby ==
The Mid Canterbury team play from Ashburton Showgrounds, Ashburton.

=== National Provincial Championship (NPC) ===
In the NPC Mid Canterbury won:

- the 2nd division South Island in 1980 and 1983
- the 3rd division in 1994 and 1998.

=== Heartland Championship ===
In the Heartland Championship which commenced in 2006 Mid Canterbury have won:

- the Meads Cup in 2013, 2014 and 2025
- the Lochore Cup in 2017.

Heartland Championship Results
Year	Pld	W	D	L	PF	PA	PD	BP	Pts	Place	Playoffs		
Year	Pld	W	D	L	PF	PA	PD	BP	Pts	Place	Qual	SF	F
2006	8	4	0	4	155	178	−22	3	19	4th	Meads Cup	Lost 17–30 to Wanganui	—
2007	8	6	0	2	213	151	+62	4	28	2nd	Meads Cup	Lost 0–18 to Wanganui	—
2008	8	7	0	1	225	129	+96	5	33	2nd	Meads Cup	Won 38–24 against North Otago	Lost 12–27 to Wanganui
2009	8	7	0	1	196	133	+63	2	30	1st	Meads Cup	Won 19–17 against South Canterbury	Lost 13–34 to Wanganui
2010	6	5	0	1	179	94	+85	5	25	2nd	Meads Cup	Lost 24–40 to North Otago	—
2011	8	6	0	2	180	143	+37	6	26	4th	Meads Cup	Lost 22–32 to Wanganui	—
2012	8	3	0	5	158	162	−4	5	17	7th	Lochore Cup	Lost 20–48 to South Canterbury	—
2013	8	7	0	1	232	131	+101	5	33	1st	Meads Cup	Won 28–25 against West Coast	Won 26–20 against North Otago
2014	8	5	1	2	258	139	+119	4	26	3rd	Meads Cup	Won 29–22 against Poverty Bay	Won 36–13 against Buller
2015	8	7	0	1	295	228	+67	6	34	2nd	Meads Cup	Lost 11–26 to Wanganui	—
2016	8	5	0	3	278	198	+80	7	27	5th	Lochore Cup	Lost 24–36 to North Otago	—
2017	8	5	0	3	275	224	+51	3	26	1st	Lochore Cup	Won 56–22 against Poverty Bay	Won 47–15 against West Coast
2018	8	3	0	5	225	233	−8	7	19	8th	Lochore Cup	Lost 24–34 to Horowhitu-Kapiti	—
2019	8	1	1	6	161	236	−75	4	10	11th	No	—	
2021	8	5	0	3	226	209	+17	4	24	6th	No	—	
2022	8	3	0	5	214	249	−35	6	18	8th	Lochore Cup	Won 31–15 against North Otago	Lost 20–25 to Ngati Porou East Coast
2023	8	2	0	6	221	245	−24	8	16	9th	No	—	
2024	8	6	0	2	297	215	+82	6	30	4th	Meads Cup	Won 17–16 against South Canterbury	Lost 29–37 to Thames Valley
2025	8	8	0	0	368	186	+1821	0	40	1st	Meads Cup	Won 21-19 against Wairarapa Bush	Won 21-18 against Thames Valley
2026	8	6	0	2	305	214	+91	9	33	1st	Meads Cup	Won 37-28 against Thames Valley	Lost 14-24 to King Country

There was no Heartland Championship in 2020 due to Covid 19 restrictions.

=== Hanan Shield ===
The Hanan Shield is one of the most prestigious trophy in New Zealand's domestic rugby union competition. First played for in 1946, the Hanan Shield is based on a challenge system played between North Otago, South Canterbury and Mid Canterbury.

=== Ranfurly Shield ===
Mid Canterbury have never held the Ranfurly Shield. Unsuccessful challenges include:

2 August 1933	Canterbury	7-31	Mid Canterbury	Lancaster Park

24 September 1938	Southland	16-20	Mid Canterbury	Rugby Park Stadium, Invercargill

26 August 1939	Southland	0-50	Mid Canterbury	Rugby Park Stadium, Invercargill

22 August 1956	Canterbury	6-14	Mid Canterbury

16 July 1958	Taranaki	0-16	Mid Canterbury

16 September 1970	Canterbury	8-28	Mid Canterbury

29 September 1973	Marlborough	9-36	Mid Canterbury

3 August 1983	Canterbury	0-28	Mid Canterbury

31 August 1985	Canterbury	7-17	Mid Canterbury	Lancaster Park

30 August 1989	Auckland	0-66	Mid Canterbury	Ashburton Showgrounds

24 July 1995	Canterbury	19-64	Mid Canterbury	Ashburton Showgrounds

24 July 2002	Canterbury	10-78	Mid Canterbury	Ashburton Showgrounds

9 July 2014	Counties Manukau	46–10	Mid Canterbury	ECOLight Stadium, Pukekohe
18:00 (NZST)	Try: Dan Hyatt (2); Jared Page; Maama Vaipulu; John Tu'ugafasi; Toni Pulu; Andy Muirhead; Con: Jared Page (4/6); Pen: Jared Page (1/1)	Report	Try: Jon Sharpe; Con: Murray Williams (1/1); Pen: Murray Williams (1)

23 July 2015	Hawke's Bay	57–12	Mid Canterbury	McLean Park, Napier
19:35 (NZST)	Try: Jonah Lowe (2); Shannan Chase; Tony Lamborn; Brendon O'Connor; Zac Guildford; Ryan Tongia; Con: Ihaia West (5); Pen: Tyrone Elkington-MacDonald (3); Ihaia West	Report	Pen: Murray Williams (4)	Referee: (New Zealand) Brendon Pickerill

== All Blacks ==
There have been 3 players selected for the All Blacks while playing their club rugby in Mid Canterbury.

- Denis Cameron: All Black number 614, who played 8 games as a wing on the 1960 New Zealand rugby union tour of Australia and South Africa.
- Grant Perry: All Black number 813, who played 1 game as a hooker on the 1980 tour to Fiji.
- Jock Ross: All Black number 830 who played 5 games as a lock on the 1981 tour to France and Romania

== Super Rugby ==
Mid Canterbury along with Canterbury, Tasman, Buller, South Canterbury and West Coast make up the Crusaders Super Rugby franchise.
