= Zac Guildford =

New Zealand rugby union player

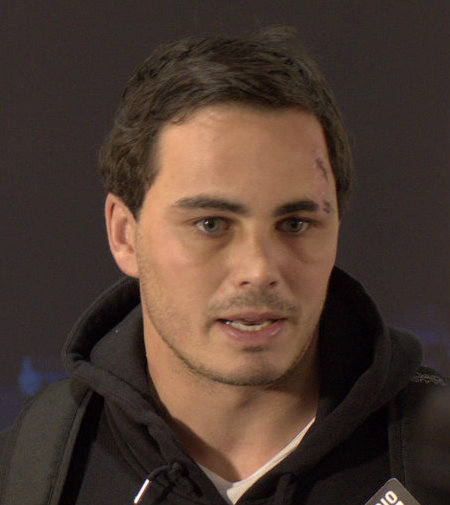
- Guildford representing New Zealand during the Rugby World Cup
- Full name: Zachary Robert Guildford
- Born: 8 February 1989 (age 37) Greytown, New Zealand
- Height: 1.82 m (6 ft 0 in)
- Weight: 97 kg (214 lb; 15 st 4 lb)
- School: Napier Boys' High School

Rugby union career
- Position(s): Wing, Fullback, Centre
Senior career
Years	Team	Apps	(Points)
2007–2015	Hawke's Bay	77	(225)
2008–2009	Hurricanes	18	(40)
2010–2013	Crusaders	61	(110)
2014–2015	Clermont	21	(15)
2016	NSW Waratahs	7	(5)
2016	West Harbour	4	(0)
2016	Wairarapa Bush	9	(24)
2017	Waikato	7	(5)
2018–2019	Nevers	10	(15)
2019	East Coast	7	(10)
2021	Wairarapa Bush	1	(0)
- Correct as of 12 November 2023
International career
Years	Team	Apps	(Points)
2006	New Zealand U18	3	(15)
2007	New Zealand U19	5	(15)
2008–2009	New Zealand U20	10	(50)
2009–2012	New Zealand	10	(30)
2013	Māori All Blacks	2	(5)
- Correct as of 12 November 2023
National sevens team
Years	Team		Comps
2010	New Zealand		1
- Correct as of 24 May 2020
Medal record
Men's rugby sevens
Representing New Zealand
Commonwealth Games
Gold medal – first place	2010 Delhi	Team competition

Zachary Robert Guildford (born 8 February 1989) is a retired New Zealand professional rugby union player who played as a wing most notably for National Provincial Championship club Hawke's Bay and the New Zealand national team.

== Early life ==
Guildford was born in Greytown, New Zealand, to Deborah and Robert Guildford. His father and uncle Daren both played for Wairarapa Bush in the early 1990s. He has one younger brother, Victor. When Guildford was 10 years old, his family moved to Napier, Hawke's Bay, where he went through the rugby academy system. He attended Napier Boys' High School.

Guildford was selected for a New Zealand under-17 rugby camp in 2005. Guildford was selected for New Zealand Schoolboys in 2006, scoring three tries across the side's three games. Following these appearances, he signed a three-year contract with Hawke's Bay at the end of 2006, and intended to start studying sport and recreation & business management at the Eastern Institute of Technology the following year.

== Club career ==
Selected out of the Taradale Rugby Club, Guildford made his debut for Hawke's Bay in 2007 aged 18, making him one of the youngest players to play in the Air New Zealand Cup. In his debut season for Hawke's Bay, he played 14 games and scored eight tries, two of them being scored in a 30–26 win over Waikato.

After a strong season with Hawke's Bay in the previous year, Guildford was selected for the Hurricanes 2008 season at age 18, making him New Zealand's youngest Super Rugby player at the time. Guildford later debuted for the Hurricanes at the age of 19 years and 70 days, making him the youngest on debut for the franchise also, beating the previous record held by Christian Cullen by almost a year. Despite breaking his arm in pre-season, Guildford played six matches in the 2008 Super 14 season, starting all the matches except one, and scoring three tries.

Guildford missed the beginning of the 2011 Super Rugby season after straining his hamstring in a 40–21 win against the Highlanders. Due to the four-match ban given to him by New Zealand Rugby, Guildford missed the Crusaders' three pre-season matches and their first competition match against the Blues in the 2012 Super Rugby season. With fellow wings Ben Smith, Julian Savea, Charles Piutau, Cory Jane, and Frank Halai being preferred by the All Blacks, Guildford sought an overseas contract.

In January 2014, it was announced that Guildford signed a contract for two years (with the option of a third) with French Top 14 side Clermont Auvergne. Guildford did not play any Super Rugby matches in 2014, instead playing club rugby in Christchurch and Napier, but did play a game for the Crusaders Development side during the pre-season. He was meant to join Clermont at the conclusion of the 2014 Super Rugby season, but in May 2014, he was released early from his contract by the Crusaders due to his poor fitness. Guildford was set to miss up to four weeks of rugby for Clermont after an assault on him left him with a badly bruised jaw.

In early May 2015, Guildford announced that he had ended his contract with Clermont Auvergne, citing the distance from New Zealand and the different style of northern hemisphere rugby as reasons for his return to New Zealand. However, it was later revealed that it was actually Clermont who terminated Guildford's contract after he tested positive for cocaine. Guildford played in four pre-season games for Hawke's Bay in 2015, but was banned for four matches spear tackling Cardiff Vaega in Hawke's Bay's match against Counties Manukau.

Shortly after his return to New Zealand, Waratahs assistant coach Daryl Gibson, who Guildford played under during their time at the Crusaders, contacted Guildford with an offer of joining the Waratahs for the 2016 Super Rugby season. Guildford accepted the offer in August, but a week later stated that he may not move to the Waratahs in order to stay closer to his family and friends, and instead play Super Rugby for a New Zealand-based team, with coach Tana Umaga showing interest in signing him for the Blues. Despite the speculation, the Waratahs announced that they had signed Guildford on a ten-month contract in September and was due to move to Sydney at the end of October.

Guildford had a strong first game with the Waratahs, defeating the Queensland Reds 30–10. Guildford broke his toe during the Waratahs' game against the Rebels, ruling him out of the Waratahs' next game against the Brumbies. Guildford was dropped mid-season from the Waratahs squad, forcing him to play in the Shute Shield for West Harbour RFC, but later earned a recall into the team. In June, Guildford left the Waratahs for "wellbeing reasons".

Tasman announced in May that they had signed Guildford for the 2016 Mitre 10 Cup season to replace injured wings Viliami Lolohea and James Lowe. However, in August and before the start of the season, he and Tasman agreed to "part ways". Days after his contract with Tasman was cancelled, Guildford signed with Heartland Championship team Wairarapa Bush, who made it as far as the semi-finals of the 2016 Heartland Championship before losing to eventual champions Whanganui. Following the Heartland Championship, Guildford played in sevens tournaments in Singapore and Kuala Lumpur.

Through their mutual ties to Hawke's Bay, coach Roger Randle influenced Guildford to move to Waikato at the end of 2016. In December, Randle named Guildford in Waikato's 12-man sevens squad to compete at the Northern Regional Seven's tournament in Cambridge.

Guildford had an impressive performance for the Waikato sevens team at the national competition, where they finished runners-up behind Counties Manakau. Following the sevens season over the summer, Guildford played for Hamilton Old Boys Rugby Club in the Waikato premier competition and was selected by Waikato for the 2017 Mitre 10 Cup. Playing at fullback, he suffered a hamstring injury during Waikato's 23–10 defeat to Manawatu in Hamilton and was replaced by Tyler Campbell. The injury ruled him out of selection for their next game against Wellington.

Despite a strong Mitre 10 Cup performance for Waikato, he was not signed by any Super Rugby teams for the 2018 Super Rugby season, a result that Guildford attributed to "[coaches and New Zealand Rugby] still looking at the old Zac Guildford". Following the 2017 Mitre 10 Cup season, Guildford was named in the Waikato sevens team a second time to compete in the Northern Regional Seven's tournament.

Guildford was named in the wider training squad for Wairarapa Bush in May 2021.

== International career ==
Guildford represented New Zealand at the 2007 U19 Rugby World Cup in Belfast, and started in all of the sides five games at the tournament, and scored three tries. Guildford won the New Zealand Age Grade Player of the Year in 2007.

Guildford played for New Zealand in the 2009 Junior World Championship hosted in Japan as the only returning player from the previous year's side. He scored two tries in the final, and became the top try-scorer of the tournament for 2009 and all-time. Guildford held the all-time try scorer record before it was broken by Julian Savea, and then again by Andrew Kellaway.

Following the JWC, he made his All Blacks debut against Wales on 7 November 2009 at Millennium Stadium, Cardiff. Starting on the left wing, Guildford played the entire match as the All Blacks won 12–19, his performance including a try-saving tackle against lock Alun Wyn Jones. Guildford's second test was on 21 November 2009 against England at Twickenham Stadium where the All Blacks won 6–19. After a third match against Barbarian F.C., he was voted one of the New Zealand Rugby Almanack's players of the year.

When the All Blacks' 2010 Tri Nations squad was named the day after the All Blacks' 29–10 win against Wales in Hamilton; Guildford was omitted. He was then selected for the 22-man trial squad for New Zealand's 2010 Commonwealth Games sevens team, meaning that Guildford would not play in the All Blacks' northern hemisphere tour too.

After a poor performance against Australia and a late-night drinking session that followed, Guildford's chances of being selected for the All Blacks' 2011 Rugby World Cup squad looked to be remote. Despite this, he was included in the squad, selected ahead of more experienced wings like Hosea Gear and Sitiveni Sivivatu. A hamstring injury to Richard Kahui presented him an opportunity to be chosen for New Zealand's final pool match against Canada, where he scored four tries in the All Blacks' 79–15 victory. Guildford injured his own hamstring, and did not play in the rest of New Zealand's matches at the tournament.

== Personal life ==
=== Legal troubles ===
On 11 November 2011, Guildford was cited in Rarotonga, where he was accused of drunken naked assaults during an alcohol-fuelled series of incidents. On that night, police were called after receiving a complaint that Guildford and another man were arguing and fighting on the side of the road about who had lost the key to their scooter. While the other man was being questioned by the police, Guildford wandered off. A member of the public later called police to say he was walking naked along the road and police officers were sent to look for him. Naked, and bleeding from a wound to his forehead, Guildford walked into Trader Jack's restaurant and punched one man that asked him if he needed help. He then staggered towards the bar and hit a 60-year old Australian man across the back of the head. Guildford then jumped on top of the restaurant's stage as staff tried to wrap an apron around him. The police were called again and arrived shortly afterwards to apprehend him. Police were taking Guildford to hospital when he attempted to leap out of the police van and into lagoon to escape custody. The attempt failed, and he spent the rest of the night in a police cell.

Following the incident, Guildford imposed a 12-month drinking ban upon himself, was banned by New Zealand Rugby for four matches, and required to undergo alcohol treatment and counselling at his own expense. Trader Jack's has a framed copy of a Dominion Post article regarding Guildford's incident hanging in the restaurant.

On the night of 20 December 2019 in the Taradale suburb of Napier, New Zealand, Guildford punched a woman in a car. The woman was sitting in the front passenger seat of a car, when Guildford, sitting in the rear, extremely intoxicated and without warning, punched her in the face. The assault was apparently sparked by a remark the woman made about one of Guildford's family members. The victim suffered two black eyes, serious bruising and swelling. At Guildford's sentencing on January 15, 2021, his lawyer Rob Quin argued for Guildford to be a convicted and discharged and granted permanent name suppression, however Judge Robert Speer sentenced Guildford to two years intensive supervision. Quin immediately sought leave to appeal Judge Robert Speer's decision. Justice Paul Davidson upheld the sentence and denied name suppression.

In March 2022, Guildford was sentenced to nine months’ home detention for two separate fraud charges involving family and friends. A month prior to the sentencing for the fraud charges, he was convicted and discharged for breaching an intensive supervision order by drinking alcohol. On 8 February 2023, Guildford was convicted and discharged for breaching the conditions of his home detention by smoking cannabis.

=== Alcohol issues ===
On 12 January 2013, a guest at a house party in Christchurch alleged that Guildford arrived to the party "completely out of control" and assaulted a fellow party goer. Guildford's Crusaders teammate Andy Ellis was called to retrieve Guildford, and took him home. Guildford checked himself into a 28-day rehabilitation course following the incident.

In August 2011, following the All Blacks loss to Australia in Brisbane, Guildford admitted to binge-drinking at the team hotel in breach of an agreement that he had with All Blacks coaches.

On 24 July 2019 Guildford's driver's licence was suspended for three months after accumulating too many demerit points on it. He was subsequently stopped at a police checkpoint on Wellesley St, Auckland on 14 August 2019. His car was immediately impounded. On 23 September he pleaded guilty to driving while disqualified, and was disqualified from driving for a further six months, and ordered to pay a $300 fine plus $130 in court costs.

== Career statistics ==
=== Club summary ===
Club	Year	Competition	GP	TRY	CON	PEN	DGL	PTS
Hawke's Bay	2007	NPC (incl. Ranfurly Shield)	14	8	0	0	0	40
Hawke's Bay	2008	NPC (incl. Ranfurly Shield)	13	8	0	0	0	40
Hawke's Bay	2009	NPC (incl. Ranfurly Shield)	13	14	0	0	0	70
Hawke's Bay	2010	NPC (incl. Ranfurly Shield)	11	3	0	0	0	15
Hawke's Bay	2011	NPC (incl. Ranfurly Shield)	1	2	0	0	0	10
Hawke's Bay	2012	NPC (incl. Ranfurly Shield)	4	0	0	0	0	0
Hawke's Bay	2013	NPC (incl. Ranfurly Shield)	12	6	0	0	0	30
Hawke's Bay	2015	NPC (incl. Ranfurly Shield)	9	4	0	0	0	20
Waikato	2017	NPC (incl. Ranfurly Shield)	7	1	0	0	0	5
Hurricanes	2008	Super Rugby	6	3	0	0	0	15
Hurricanes	2009	Super Rugby	12	5	0	0	0	25
Crusaders	2010	Super Rugby	14	6	0	0	0	30
Crusaders	2011	Super Rugby	15	5	0	0	0	25
Crusaders	2012	Super Rugby	17	8	0	0	0	40
Crusaders	2013	Super Rugby	15	3	0	0	0	15
Waratahs	2016	Super Rugby	7	1	0	0	0	5
Clermont Auvergne	2014–15	Top 14	18	1	0	0	0	5
Clermont Auvergne	2014–15	Champions Cup	3	2	0	0	0	10
Wairarapa Bush	2016	Heartland Championship	9	4	0	0	0	24^{a}
Wairarapa Bush	2021	Heartland Championship	1	0	0	0	0	0
Ngati Porou East Coast	2019	Heartland Championship	8	4	0	0	0	20
Nevers	2018–19	Pro D2	10	3	0	0	0	15
Career			219	91	0	0	0	459

Updated: 10 March 2023 Source: Zachery Robert Guildford | Rugby History, Zac Guildford | All Rugby, Zac Guildford | Wairarapa Bush, Zac Guildford | Ngati Porou East Coast

=== List of international tries ===
List of test matches
Date	Opposition	Score	Venue	Tour/series	Tries	Ref
7 November 2009	Wales	12-19	Millennium Stadium, Cardiff	2009 All Blacks end-of-year tour	0	
21 November 2009	England	6-19	Twickenham Stadium, London	2009 All Blacks end-of-year tour	0	
12 June 2010	Ireland	66-28	Yarrow Stadium, New Plymouth	2010 Irish tour of New Zealand and Australia	0	
26 June 2010	Wales	29-10	Waikato Stadium, Hamilton	2010 Welsh tour of New Zealand	0	
22 July 2011	Fiji	60-14	Carisbrook, Dunedin	One-off test	0	
30 July 2011	South Africa	40-7	Westpac Stadium, Wellington	2010 Tri Nations	2	
27 August 2011	Australia	25–20	Lang Park, Brisbane	2010 Tri Nations	0	
2 October 2011	Canada	79-15	Westpac Stadium, Wellington	2011 Rugby World Cup	4	
9 June 2012	Ireland	42-10	Eden Park, Auckland	2012 Irish tour of New Zealand	0	
16 June 2012	Ireland	22-19	AMI Stadium, Christchurch	2012 Irish tour of New Zealand	0	

Awards
Preceded by Piri Weepu	Tom French Memorial; Māori rugby union player of the year 2009	Succeeded by Hosea Gear
