= Poverty Bay Rugby Football Union =

Governing body for rugby union in Gisborne, New Zealand

Poverty Bay

Club information
- Full name: Poverty Bay Rugby Football Union
- Colours: Scarlet and White
- Founded: 1890
- Website: Official website

Current details
- Ground: Rugby Park, Gisborne
- Coach: Tom Cairns
- Captain: Tamanui Hill
- Competition: Heartland Championship

The Poverty Bay Rugby Football Union is the governing body for rugby union within the Gisborne district, in the area surrounding Poverty Bay on the east coast of the North Island of New Zealand. The men's representative team play from Rugby Park, Gisborne, and currently compete in the Heartland Championship.

== History ==
The Poverty Bay Rugby Football Union was established in 1890 by four clubs in the Gisborne area — Gisborne, Turanganui, Poverty Bay and Waerenga-a-Hika — with the union's inaugural first-class match being held against Hawke's Bay the same year. Since then, the union has played against every other existent union in New Zealand as well as an array of overseas touring sides, including but not limited to Australia, England, South Africa and Japan, against whom Poverty Bay drew in 1974. In 1981, Rugby Park was the scene of clashes between pro-tour supporters and anti-tour protesters prior to a match against the touring South African side. Poverty Bay ultimately lost the game by 6 - 24.

== Club rugby ==
=== Club championship ===
Lee Brothers Shield

The Lee Brothers Shield was named in honour of Stan, Fred, Norm, Harry and Dave Lee. Stan Lee designed the shield and it was crafted from heart rimu, mounted on sterling silver by the late George Geddes. First presented in 1947 to Old Boys who won on a points system before Grand Finals were introduced. In 1969 the first Grand Final was played, with Ngatapa winning the shield.

- 2026 YMP 17 - 16 High School Old Boys
- 2025 YMP 21 - 7 Tapuae
- 2024 Tapuae 13 - 5 YMP
- 2023 YMP 15 - 0 Waikohu
- 2022 YMP 28-21 Waikohu

== Provincial representative rugby ==
=== National Provincial Championship ===
Poverty Bay won the National Provincial Championship (NPC) Third division, in:

- 1987 - coached by Grant Allen and captained by former Canterbury representative Tony Thorpe, the team was unbeaten in all 9 games they played that season including a 26-16 victory over Hawkes Bay. Fullback Richard Owen scored 104 points in NPC matches (122 in total for the season) and Andrew Hansen scored 7 tries.
- 2004 - coached by Kiwi Searancke and captained by Mark Jefferson, a former first class cricketer.

They also finished runners-up in the same division in 1994, 1995 and 1999.

=== Heartland Championship ===
Since 2006, Poverty Bay have competed in the Heartland Championship, a competition organised by the New Zealand Rugby Union for New Zealand's amateur unions. Since the introduction of the format in 2006, the team have had great success, winning the Lochore Cup on four occasions:

- 2006 coached by Paul Feeney with Scott Leighton as captain and main goal kicker scoring 115 points for the season.
- 2007 coached by Feeney and captained by Leighton who scored 114 points in Heartland games (144 on all games).
- 2008 coached by Feeney and captained by Leighton. A young Charlie Ngatai from Gisborne Boys' High School also appeared in three games scoring four tries including two in the final.
- 2011 coached by Granger Heikell and captain Leighton. John Stewart scored a Poverty Bay season record equaling 11 tries.

Poverty Bay have not managed to win the Meads Cup, having been eliminated in the semi-finals in 2009, 2010 and 2014.

Heartland Championship results
Year	Pld	W	D	L	PF	PA	PD	BP	Pts	Place	Playoffs		
Year	Pld	W	D	L	PF	PA	PD	BP	Pts	Place	Qual	Semifinal	Final
2006	8	5	0	3	243	194	+49	4	24	7th	Lochore Cup	Won 36–10 against Buller	Won 46–34 against King Country
2007	8	5	0	3	193	162	+31	4	24	7th	Lochore Cup	Won 65–3 against Thames Valley	Won 38–35 against South Canterbury
2008	8	5	0	3	196	131	+65	3	23	7th	Lochore Cup	Won 43–30 against South Canterbury	Won 26–5 against Horowhenua-Kapiti
2009	8	6	0	2	154	181	−27	2	26	3rd	Meads Cup	Lost 13–48 to Wanganui	—
2010	8	6	0	2	282	164	+118	4	28	3rd	Meads Cup	Lost 24–31 to Wanganui	—
2011	8	3	1	4	184	226	+40	5	19	8th	Lochore Cup	Won 32–30 against Buller	Won 49–22 against South Canterbury
2012	8	3	0	5	212	247	−35	5	17	8th	Lochore Cup	Lost 22–42 to Buller	—
2013	8	1	0	7	141	240	−99	2	6	12th	No	—	
2014	8	5	1	2	231	168	+63	6	28	2nd	Meads Cup	Lost 22–29 to Mid Canterbury	—
2015	8	1	0	7	227	333	−106	6	10	11th	No	—	
2016	8	3	0	5	296	268	+28	8	20	7th	Lochore Cup	Lost 26-48 to King Country	—
2017	8	4	0	4	185	229	-44	4	20	8th	Lochore Cup	Lost 22-56 to Mid Canterbury	—
2018	8	2	0	6	193	302	−109	8	16	11th	No	—	
2019	8	3	0	5	237	257	-20	8	20	8th	Lochore Cup	Lost 35-41 to Wairarapa Bush	—
2021	8	4	0	4	263	223	+40	8	24	5th	No	—	
2022	8	3	0	5	183	242	-59	4	16	10th	No	—	
2023	8	2	0	6	229	249	-20	8	16	8th	Lochore Cup	Won 40-35 against North Otago	Lost 20-23 against West Coast
2024	8	0	0	8	190	350	-160	6	6	12th	No	—	
2025	8	4	0	4	249	247	+2	5	25	7th	Lochore Cup	Lost 46-48 to North Otago	—
2026	8	2	0	6	268	320	-52	6	14	9th	No	—	

=== Ranfurly Shield ===
Poverty Bay have never held the Ranfurly Shield. In 1980, Poverty Bay came close to defeating Auckland, losing a hard-fought encounter 12 - 19.

==== Past challenges ====
1911	Auckland	29-10	Poverty Bay

1913	Auckland	27-3	Poverty Bay

1923	Hawke's Bay	15-0	Poverty Bay

1924	Hawke's Bay	46-10	Poverty Bay

1948	Otago	40-0	Poverty Bay

1957	Wellington	15-3	Poverty Bay

1960	North Auckland	24-3	Poverty Bay

1968	Hawke's Bay	21-5	Poverty Bay

1972	North Auckland	31-3	Poverty Bay

1978	Manawatu	24-0	Poverty Bay

9 August 1980	Auckland	19-12	Poverty Bay	Auckland

29 August 1990	Auckland	42-3	Poverty Bay	Gisborne

7 August 1996	Auckland	88-20	Poverty Bay	Gisborne

18 July 1998	Waikato	121-0	Poverty Bay	Hamilton

28 July 2004	Auckland	67-3	Poverty Bay	Auckland

15 July 2008	Auckland	54-3	Poverty Bay	Gisborne

28 July 2018	Taranaki	78-0	Poverty Bay	Tikorangi Domain

== All Blacks ==
There have been seven players selected for the All Blacks whilst playing for Poverty Bay:

- John Collins: All Blacks 1964-65
- Hika Elliot: Poverty Bay 2014, All Blacks 2010-15
- Brian Fitzpatrick: All Blacks 1951-1954. Father of All Black captain Sean Fitzpatrick
- Ian Kirkpatrick: All Blacks 1967-77
- Lawrie Knight: All Blacks 1974-77
- Mike Parkinson: All Blacks 1972-73
- Richard "Tiny" White: All Blacks 1946-57.

Players who became All Blacks after previously representing Poverty Bay include:

- Hosea Gear: Poverty Bay 2000, All Blacks 2008-12
- Rico Gear: Poverty Bay 1997 (also 2014-16), All Blacks 2004-07
- Charlie Ngatai: Poverty Bay 2008, All Blacks 2015.

== Super Rugby ==
Poverty Bay along with Wellington, Wairarapa Bush, Wanganui, Hawke's Bay, Manawatu and Horowhenua-Kapiti fall within the Hurricanes catchment. Hosea Gear is the most notable player from the Poverty Bay region to have played for the side.
