= Wairarapa Bush Rugby Football Union =

Rugby team in New Zealand

- Sport: Rugby union
- Founded: 1971
- President: Bryan Weatherstone
- CEO: Tony Hargood
- Men's coach: Joe Harwood
- Website: waibush.co.nz

The Wairarapa Bush Rugby Football Union is the body that regulates rugby union in Masterton, New Zealand. It was formed in 1971 with the amalgamation of the Wairapapa and Bush Unions.

The Wairarapa Bush team play in the Heartland Championship from Memorial Park, Masterton. They were the inaugural winners of the Meads Cup after beating Wanganui 16–14 on 21 October 2006.

== Club rugby ==
Wairarapa Bush Rugby Football Union is made up of 14 clubs, from north to south:

- Puketoi
- Eketahuna
- East Coast
- Pioneer
- Marist
- Wairarapa Wahine Toa - Women's Rugby
- Masterton Red Star
- Carterton
- Gladstone
- Greytown
- Featherston
- Martinborough
- Tuhirangi

=== Club champions ===
Chris “Moose” Kapene Cup

- 2026 - Greytown 32 Carterton 29
- 2025 - Greytown 26 Carterton 21
- 2024 - Carterton 27 Marist 26
- 2023 - Carterton 29 Greytown 26
- 2022 - Carterton 32 Marist 24

== Championships ==
Wairarapa Bush has won the following provincial titles:

- 2nd division North Island in 1981
- 3rd division in 2005
- Heartland Championship Meads Cup in 2006
- Lochore Cup in 2010.

=== Heartland Championship placings ===
Heartland Championship results
Year	Pld	W	D	L	PF	PA	PD	BP	Pts	Place	Playoffs		
Year	Pld	W	D	L	PF	PA	PD	BP	Pts	Place	Qual	Semi-final	Final
2006	8	7	0	1	211	130	+81	3	31	2nd	Meads Cup	Won 25–19 against North Otago	Won 16–14 against Wanganui
2007	8	5	0	3	196	131	+65	3	23	4th	Meads Cup	Lost 13–30 to North Otago	—
2008	8	3	0	5	202	194	+8	7	19	3rd	Lochore Cup	Lost 17–37 to Horowhenua-Kapiti	—
2009	8	3	0	5	155	142	+13	5	17	6th	No	—	
2010	6	2	0	4	129	186	−57	3	11	2nd	Lochore Cup	Won 21–17 against King Country	Won 15–9 against Buller
2011	8	1	0	7	156	231	−75	4	8	10th	No	—	
2012	8	6	0	2	219	130	+89	4	28	3rd	Meads Cup	Lost 20–23 against Wanganui	—
2013	8	6	0	2	203	144	+59	4	28	3rd	Meads Cup	Lost 34–48 to North Otago	—
2014	8	1	1	6	151	238	−87	3	9	11th	No	—	
2015	8	4	0	4	238	192	+46	7	23	4th	Meads Cup	Lost 21–25 to South Canterbury	—
2016	8	6	0	2	240	174	+66	6	30	4th	Meads Cup	Lost 26–58 to Wanganui	—
2017	8	1	0	7	174	313	-139	6	10	11th	No	—	
2018	8	4	0	4	212	195	+17	5	21	6th	Lochore Cup	Won 30–21 against North Otago	Lost 23–26 against Horowhenua-Kapiti
2019	8	6	0	2	209	181	+28	5	29	3rd	Meads Cup	Lost 25–27 to North Otago	—
2021	8	2	0	6	139	254	-115	2	10	10th	No	—	
2022	8	2	0	6	199	297	-98	5	13	11th	No	—	
2023	8	4	0	4	190	246	-56	6	22	6th	Lochore Cup	Lost 27–33 to West Coast	—
2024	8	2	0	6	246	393	-147	5	13	10th	No	—	
2025	8	5	0	3	290	226	+64	3	28	4th	Meads Cup	Lost 19–21 to Mid Canterbury	—
2026	8	5	0	3	277	250	+27	5	25	8th	Lochore Cup	Lost 26-36 to South Canterbury	

== Ranfurly Shield ==
Wairarapa Bush have never held the Ranfurly Shield but Wairarapa held the shield in 1927, 1928 and 1950. Wairarapa Bush were beaten 96–10 by Canterbury in a Ranfurly Shield challenge in July 2006. In July 2015 Wairarapa Bush challenged Hawke's Bay for the Shield but were defeated 58–7.

9 July 2015
14:35 (NZST)

Hawke's Bay	58–7	Wairarapa Bush
Try: Zac Guildford (2); Jarvy Aoake; Shannan Chase; Billy Ropiha; Tyrone Elkington-MacDonald; Brendon O'Connor; Jonah Lowe; Con: Tyrone Elkington-MacDonald (5); Ihaia West; Pen: Tyrone Elkington-MacDonald (2)	Report	Try: Brock Price; Con: Tim Priest (1/1)

McLean Park, Napier
Referee: Jamie Nutbrown

== Super Rugby ==
Wairarapa Bush along with Wellington, Horowhenua-Kapiti, Poverty Bay, Hawke's Bay, Manawatu and Wanganui make up the Hurricanes Super Rugby franchise.

== All Blacks ==
There have been 29 players selected for the All Blacks from the Wairarapa Bush (from 1971) and when the Union was separated as Wairarapa and Bush Unions.

Wairarapa Bush (from 1971)

- Brian Lochore 1963,65,66,67,68,69,70,71
- Mike McCool 1979
- Brent Anderson 1986,87
- Marty Berry 1986 and 1993
- Brett Harvey 1986
- Robbie McLean 1987
- Zac Guildford 2009–2012

Pre 1971 {Wairarapa & Bush Unions}

- Hart Udy 1884
- Archie D'Arcy 1893,1894
- Rod Gray 1893
- William (Mac) McKenzie 1893–97
- Billy Watson 1893,1896
- Dan Udy 1901–1903
- Loftus Armstrong 1903
- Archie McMinn 1903,1905
- Edgar Wrigley 1905
- Jim Donald 1920,21,22,25
- Quentin Donald 1923,26,28
- Ian Harvey 1924,26,28
- Albert Edward Cooke 1928
- Mick Willoughby 1928
- Rawi Cundy 1929
- Atholstan Mahoney 1929,34,35
- Keith Reid 1929
- Walter Reside 1929
- Clinton Stringfellow 1929
- William (Bull) Irvine 1929
- Jimmy Mill 1923–1926, 1930
- Ben Couch 1947–49
- Alan Blake 1949

== See also ==
- Memorial Park, Masterton
