= North Otago Rugby Football Union =

New Zealand rugby union province

North Otago

Club information
- Full name: North Otago Rugby Football Union
- Colours: Gold, Maroon and Blue
- Founded: 1904, (joined NZRFU in 1927)
- Website: norfu.net.nz "official site"

Current details
- Ground: Centennial Park
- Competition: Heartland Championship

The North Otago Rugby Football Union (NORFU) is a New Zealand rugby union province based in Oamaru and compete in the Heartland Championship. They are one of the strongest teams in The Heartland Championship, winning the Meads Cup section of the competition in its second year, 2007 as well as 2010. Their home ground is Whitestone Contracting Stadium, formerly Centennial Park.

== History ==
The North Otago Rugby Football Union was formed in 1904 but did not join the New Zealand Rugby Football Union until 1927. In 1930 North Otago played the All Blacks at the Oamaru Showgrounds before the All Blacks first test against the British and Irish Lions, however North Otago lost 6–34.

== Provincial representative rugby ==
1946 saw the first Hanan Shield fixture with a 6–9 loss against South Canterbury.

1962 saw North Otago beat the Australian national team 14–13, and another win against Southland 19-8. The team narrowly lost to Otago 14–11.

In 1965 North Otago beat Otago 18–11.

In 1971, Kurow's Phil Gard was selected for the All Blacks, fourth test against the Lions at Eden Park.

The 1980s were unsuccessful years as North Otago won very few games.

1993 North Otago Team

The highlight of the early 1990s was a Ranfurly Shield challenge in 1993 when Auckland brought the trophy on tour. The crowd went delirious after 5 minutes when Brent McEwan scored a try from a set move to give North Otago a 5–0 lead. However, the talent of Auckland then shone through and they scored 139 unanswered points. John Kirwan scored eight tries. The 1997 season proved to be a fairy-tale effort with the team having its best season yet in NPC rugby. The side finished as top qualifier, won its home semi final and went down to in the final.

1997 North Otago Team

In the late 1990s, North Otago found sustained success under coaching from Greg Shipton and Peter Cook. 1998 saw North Otago lose two of its nine games, a significant improvement from previous decades.

=== National Provincial Championship ===
North Otago won the 3rd Division title in 2002 with a 43–19 win against Horowhenua-Kapiti, which took them into the 2nd Division for the 2003 season. North Otago made the 2nd Division semi-finals in 2003, 2004, and 2005 but losing all three.

In 2000, Glenn Moore took over the reins with Paddy Stewart. Moore, a former Mid Canterbury representative, had instant success with the side and only narrowly lost the final against East Coast 21–25. 2001 looked like North Otago's season, winning all of its seven games. However, in the final it was a disappointing four-point loss to South Canterbury 16–20. 2002 saw the North Otago Rugby Union celebrate its 75th jubilee and it indeed appropriate that in the 75th year of its existence the side should take the third division title beating Horowhenua 43-19 before an ecstatic crowd. 2003 and the challenges of Division Two was very much a daunting task. However, the team responded magnificently and finished in the top four but lost the semi-final to Hawke's Bay in Napier in controversial circumstances. The highlight of the season was a superb win against Counties-Manukau. 2004 saw North Otago once again playing above its weight making the semi-finals before going down to Nelson Bays.

==== North Otago 2002 season ====
North Otago had lost the 2001 Division 3 NPC final against South Canterbury.

North Otago's first match of the 2002 season was a Hanan Shield match against Mid Canterbury, winning the game 43–16.

For the first match of the 2002 NPC season they played West Coast, which they won 60–6. North Otago then beat South Canterbury 39-9 at Timaru home advantage. North Otago then faced Buller at home, winning 38–15.

North Otago then won against Horowhenua-Kapiti (40-0), Wanganui (73-7), Poverty Bay (49–32), Wairarapa-Bush (27–14), and King Country (27–16)

North Otago had earned a home semi-finals against South Canterbury, which they won 58–10. This led to a home final against Horowhenua-Kapiti which resulted in a 43–19 win for North Otago to win the NPC Division Three title.

=== Heartland Championship ===
North Otago have won the following Heartland Championship titles:

- Meads Cup: 2007, 2010 and 2019
- Lochore Cup: 2009, 2016 and 2025.

Heartland Championship results
Year	Pld	W	D	L	PF	PA	PD	BP	Pts	Place	Playoffs		
Year	Pld	W	D	L	PF	PA	PD	BP	Pts	Place	Qual	Semifinal	Final
2006	8	6	0	2	332	154	+178	7	31	3rd	Meads Cup	Lost 19–25 to Wairarapa Bush	—
2007	8	6	0	2	266	104	+162	5	29	1st	Meads Cup	Won 30–13 against Wairarapa Bush	Won 25–8 against Wanganui
2008	8	5	0	3	169	117	+52	4	24	3rd	Meads Cup	Lost 24–38 to Mid Canterbury	—
2009	8	4	0	4	252	144	+108	4	20	2nd	Lochore Cup	Won 31–27 against King Country	Won 21–13 against West Coast
2010	8	7	0	1	345	136	+209	6	34	1st	Meads Cup	Won 40–24 against Mid Canterbury	Won 39–18 against Wanganui
2011	8	7	1	0	265	149	+115	5	35	2nd	Meads Cup	Lost 17–23 to East Coast	—
2012	8	5	0	3	195	194	+1	5	25	4th	Meads Cup	Lost 15–26 to East Coast	—
2013	8	6	0	2	216	159	+57	5	29	2nd	Meads Cup	Won 48–34 against Wairarapa Bush	Lost 20–26 to Mid Canterbury
2014	8	4	0	4	174	155	+19	3	20	7th	Lochore Cup	Won 16–12 against South Canterbury	Lost 12–14 to Wanganui
2015	8	4	0	4	189	252	−63	4	20	8th	Lochore Cup	Won 57–12 against Horowhenua-Kapiti	Lost 34–47 to King Country
2016	8	2	2	4	230	246	-16	6	18	8th	Lochore Cup	Won 36-24 against Mid Canterbury	Won 44-22 against King Country
2017	8	4	0	4	235	178	+57	9	25	7th	Lochore Cup	Lost 14-24 to West Coast	—
2018	8	4	0	4	213	209	+4	4	20	7th	Lochore Cup	Lost 14-24 to Wairarapa Bush	—
2019	8	6	0	2	240	163	+77	5	29	2nd	Meads Cup	Won 27-25 against Wairarapa Bush	Won 33-19 against Wanganui
2021	8	5	0	3	220	198	+22	5	25	4th	Lochore Cup	No semi final played	Lost 16-22 against Whanganui
2022	8	4	0	4	315	201	+114	7	23	5th	Lochore Cup	Lost 15-31 to Mid Canterbury	—
2023	8	4	0	4	259	228	+31	6	22	5th	Lochore Cup	Lost 35-40 to Poverty Bay	—
2024	8	2	0	6	240	201	+39	6	14	9th	No	—	
2025	8	5	0	3	279	290	-11	1	26	6th	Lochore Cup	Won 48-46 against Poverty Bay	Won 64-47 against Horowhenua-Kapiti
2026	8	6	0	2	333	255	+78	8	32	2nd	Meads Cup	Lost 24-36 to King Country	—

==== North Otago 2007 season ====
In 2006 North Otago lost in the semi-finals of the new Heartland Championship. But 2007 was a new year and North Otago were focused on making the final. North Otago's first game was against Buller in Oamaru, with North Otago taking it away 51–20. A trip to Gisborne led to a win over Poverty Bay 31–11. North Otago went back home for a Hanan Shield defence against South Canterbury, continuing their winning streak 26–7. Another home game saw North Otago beating East Coast 38–5.

In the next game North Otago went to Wanganui for a 39–16 win. King Country came down to play but they never got in the game and North Otago cruised out to a 52–5 lead. North Otago then lost 7-15 to Wairarapa Bush and 22-25 to Mid-Canterbury.

North Otago with the Meads Cup

But the season was not over. North Otago had secured a home semi-final and it was against Wairarapa Bush. Last time the teams faced it was Wairarapa Bush who won, but in the semi-final North Otago were stronger and won the match 30–13. So it was into the finals for North Otago. The conditions were perfect and the local Oamaru people had come out in force to wish their team well. North Otago played hard but so did Wanganui. And the game looked like it may have gone Wanganui's way. But North Otago stayed strong to win the Meads Cup final 25 points to 8.

=== Hanan Shield ===
The Hanan Shield is one of the most prestigious trophies in New Zealand's domestic rugby union competition. First played for in 1946, the Hanan Shield is based on a challenge system played between North Otago, South Canterbury and Mid Canterbury. North Otago's best win was in 1997 when they defeated South Canterbury 20–17 to bring the Hanan Shield back to North Otago for the first time in 30 years.

=== Ranfurly Shield ===
Since North Otago were founded they have yet to win the Ranfurly Shield. They have had the following challenges:

- 27 August 1938, Otago 12 North Otago 0
- 28 September 1946, Southland 15 North Otago 3 (halfback Viv Wright kicked a penalty)
- 27 September 1947, Otago 42 North Otago 3 (70 metre try to winger Mort Fountain)
- 21 August 1971, Canterbury 14 North Otago 0
- 1 September 1973, Marlborough 26 North Otago 9 (Paddy Ford kicked two penalties and Jeff Gardiner a 55-metre field goal)
- 31 August 1974, South Canterbury 9 North Otago 3 (Paddy Ford kicked a penalty)
- 20 July 1983, Canterbury 88 North Otago 0
- 1 September 1993, Auckland 139 North Otago 5 (Brent McEwan, 1 try)
- 8 July 2000 (at Oamaru), Waikato 95 North Otago 17 (Dean Paterson 1 try, Simon Porter 4 penalties)
- 2 July 2003 (at Oamaru), Canterbury 85 North Otago 24 (Campbell Mackenzie, Pila Fifita, Scott Mayhew and Mike Mavor scoring tries, Michael Ruthven and Tevita Asi kicking conversions)
- 22 July 2008 (at Oamaru), Auckland 113 North Otago 3 (Nathan Cunningham penalty)
- 9 July 2010, Southland 48 North Otago 3
- 2 July 2011, Canterbury 52 North Otago 8
- 26 July 2019 (at Oamaru), North Otago 14 Otago 49
- 28 August 2020, Canterbury 71 North Otago 7
- 30 June 2021, Hawkes Bay 85 North Otago 0
- 16 June 2026, Otago 46 North Otago 14

== Club rugby ==
North Otago Rugby Football Union is made up of six clubs who play against the Otago Metropolitan Premier Division 2 teams in a combined club competition before playing out for the local Citizens Shield:

- Excelsior FC
- Athletic Marist RFC
- Kurow RFC
- Maheno RFC
- Oamaru Old Boys RFC
- Valley RFC

The North Otago Rugby Football Union clubs used to play against the South Canterbury club sides in a combined competition before the combined Otago competition.

North Otago also have two strong secondary school teams:

- Waitaki Boys' High School
- St Kevin's College

=== Citizens Shield ===
The Citizens Shield is North Otago's premier Men's senior club competition. First awarded in 1903, with the Oamaru Football Club the inaugural holders, it has been played for annually ever since with the only brief breaks happening during World War 1 and 2.

Citizens Shield Champions
1903 – Oamaru Football Club	1904 – Oamaru Football Club	1905 – Oamaru Football Club	1906 – Athletic
1907 – Athletic	1908 – Athletic	1909 – Athletic	1910 – Athletic
1911 – Athletic	1912 – Athletic	1913 – Athletic	1914 – Athletic
1915 – Athletic	1916 – Suspended WWI	1917 – Suspended WWI	1918 – Suspended WWI
1919 – Old Boys	1920 – Old Boys	1921 – Old Boys	1922 – Old Boys
1923 – Old Boys	1924 – Excelsior	1925 – Excelsior	1926 – Maheno
1927 – Old Boys	1928 – Maheno	1929 – Old Boys	1930 – Old Boys
1931 – Hydro	1932 – Excelsior	1933 – Excelsior	1934 – Old Boys
1935 – Maheno	1936 – Old Boys	1937 – Athletic	1938 – Maheno
1939 – Athletic	1940 – Athletic	1941 – Duntroon	1942 – Suspended WWII
1943 – Suspended WWII	1944 – Duntroon	1945 – Maheno/Excelsior	1946 – Excelsior
1947 – Athletic	1948 – Athletic	1949 – Excelsior	1950 – Excelsior
1951 – Athletic	1952 – Athletic	1953 – Athletic	1954 – Athletic
1955 – Excelsior	1956 – Athletic	1957 – Old Boys	1958 – Old Boys
1959 – Old Boys	1960 – Union	1961 – Maheno	1962 – Excelsior
1963 – Maheno	1964 – Otematata	1965 – Excelsior	1966 – Athletic
1967 – Athletic	1968 – Union	1969 – Union	1970 – Union
1971 – Athletic	1972 – Athletic	1973 – Old Boys	1974 – Athletic
1975 – Union	1976 – Kurow	1977 – Kurow	1978 – Athletic
1979 – Union	1980 – Kurow	1981 – Union	1982 – Kurow
1983 – Union	1984 – Maheno	1985 – Old Boys	1986 – Old Boys
1987 – Excelsior	1988 – Excelsior	1989 – Maheno	1990 – Maheno
1991 – Old Boys	1992 – Excelsior	1993 – Athletic	1994 – Excelsior
1995 – Excelsior	1996 – Athletic	1997 – Excelsior	1998 – Valley
1999 – Valley	2000 – Athletic	2001 – Maheno	2002 – Old Boys
2003 – Athletic	2004 – Old Boys	2005 – Valley	2006 – Athletic
2007 – Old Boys	2008 – Old Boys	2009 – Valley	2010 – Athletic
2011 – Old Boys	2012 – Old Boys	2013 – Old Boys	2014 – Old Boys
2015 – Old Boys	2016 - Maheno	2017 - Old Boys	2018 - Valley
2019 - Maheno	2020 - Valley	2021 - Kurow	2022 - Kurow
2023 - Valley	2024 - Excelsior	2025 - Excelsior	

=== Recent Citizen Shield finals ===
- 2026 - Valley 31-21 Excelsior
- 2025 - Excelsior 31-28 Valley
- 2024 - Excelsior 20-19 Valley
- 2023 - Valley 26-23 Excelsior
- 2022 - Kurow 36-28 Old Boys

=== Total Citizen Shield titles by club ===
Club	Total	Outright	Shared	Last title
Athletic	32	32		2010
Old Boys	27	27		2017
Excelsior	18	17	1	2025
Maheno	13	12	1	2019
Union	8	8		1983
Kurow	6	6		2022
Valley	7	7		2026
Oamaru Football Club	3	3		1905
Duntroon	2	2		1944
Hydro	1	1		1931
Otematata	1	1		1964

== Notable players ==
=== All Blacks ===
There have only been two players selected for the All Blacks while playing their club rugby in North Otago.

- Ian (Spooky) Smith, who played for the Old Boys Club, was selected for tests against the 1965 Springboks and Mike Campbell-Lamerton's 1966 British Lions.
- Kurow's Phil Gard played for the All Blacks in the fourth and final test against the 1971 British Lions and was on the All Blacks 1972 internal tour.

=== All Blacks born in the North Otago region ===
- Ian Hurst
- Richie McCaw

=== Other Notable Players ===
- Hotili Asi: North Otago representative 2000-2005. 2001 NPC 3rd division player of the year, Tongan National Side, First Division England Rugby.
- Matt Faddes: North Otago representative 2012. Represented Otago 2011-2021, Highlanders 2016-2019, New Zealand Universities and UK Barbarians
- Kilifi Fangupo (Heartland Squad)
- Pila Fifita (1st person in any NPC Division to score 3 tries in a final),(Heartland squad),(Tongan National Side)
- Barry Fox: North Otago representative 1994-2006. Captain 1998-2003.
- Billy Guyton (Heartland Squad, Tasman NPC, Hurricanes, Crusaders & Blues Super Rugby teams)
- Ross Hay (Heartland Squad)
- Sekonaia Kalou (Flying Fijians rep and also represented Fiji in volleyball, netball & basketball).
- Campbell Mackenzie (NZ Divisional XV 2004,05)
- Mike Mavor: North Otago representative 1995-2009, Captain in 2004 & 2005. 123 games.
- Scott Mayhew (Heartland Squad)
- Steven Sasagi (U21 Samoa)
- Matt Saunders (Highlanders, Otago NPC & Southland NPC)
- Fepikou Tatafu (Tongan RWC squad 1999)
- Tom Wood (England National Side).

== Sponsors ==
- Summit Wool Spinners Limited
- Speight's
- McKeown Petroleum
- Plunket Electrical
- Meridian Energy
- Totara Hotels
- R Redpath Limited
- David Ovens Builder
- Whitestone Contracting Limited
- New Balance

== Super Rugby ==
North Otago, along with Otago and Southland, make up the Highlanders team that competes in the Super Rugby competition.
