= Reece Boughton =

English rugby player (born 1995)

- Born: 1 July 1995 (age 31) Gloucester, England
- Height: 1.75 m (5 ft 9 in)
- Weight: 82 kg (12 st 13 lb)
- School: Beaufort Community School

Rugby union career
- Position: Scrum Half
- Current team: Gloucester Rugby
Senior career
Years	Team	Apps	(Points)
- Gloucester Rugby

Reece Bougton (born 1 July 1995) is an English professional rugby union player who plays for Gloucester. He is currently dual-registered with Cinderford R.F.C.
