= Brett Harvey (rugby union) =

NZ rugby union player (born 1959)

- Born: Brett Andrew Harvey; 6 October 1959 (age 67) Palmerston North, New Zealand
- Height: 1.94 m (6 ft 4 in)
- Weight: 92 kg (203 lb)
- School: Palmerston North Boys' High School

Rugby union career
- Position: Flanker
Provincial / State sides
Years	Team	Apps	(Points)
1983–88	Wairarapa Bush	80	
International career
Years	Team	Apps	(Points)
1986	New Zealand	1	(0)

Brett Andrew Harvey (born 6 October 1959) is a former New Zealand rugby union player. A flanker, Harvey represented Wairarapa Bush at a provincial level. He played a single game for the New Zealand national side, the All Blacks, a test match against France in 1986.
