= Hanan Shield =

New Zealand Rugby union football trophy

The Hanan Shield is one of the most prestigious trophies in New Zealand's domestic rugby union competition. First played for in 1946 after being presented by the Mayor of Timaru, A. E. S. Hanan. The Hanan Shield is based on a challenge system played between North Otago, South Canterbury and Mid Canterbury. The holding union must defend the shield in challenge matches, and if a challenger defeats them, they become the new holder of the shield. A rules change at the end of the 2011 season meant that the shield is contested in all meetings between the holders and one of the other two teams.

== Record (1946–2006) ==
Union	Played	Won	Loss
South Canterbury	128	87	41
Mid Canterbury	109	47	62
North Otago	83	26	57

- A draw is recorded as a win for the holders

== 2007–2010 Mid Canterbury ==
On 6 October 2007, Mid Canterbury won the Shield from North Otago, who had held the shield since 2000, with a 25–22 victory. In a fiercely contested clash in front of a record crowd at Oamaru's Centennial Park, Mid Canterbury played themselves into a Shield winning position. Mid Canterbury made the decisive break thanks to two stunning solo tries to young winger Brenton Connell, then hung on in the final 20 minutes despite losing star midfielder Jack Umaga to a broken jaw. This ended North Otago's Hanan Shield reign of 14 defences over seven years.

6 October 2007

North Otago	22–25	Mid Canterbury

Centennial Park, Oamaru

On 9 August 2008 Mid Canterbury made their first Hanan Shield defence when they ran onto the Ashburton Showgrounds to play South Canterbury in the first Hanan Shield match contested under the new experimental law variations (ELVs). It was South Canterbury who put on the early pressure with prop Timaru Tafa crossing in the 6th minute. Mid Canterbury's 19-year-old wing Brenton Connell sliced through a midfield gap on his own 10-metre line, broke a tackle and sprinted away down the left-hand flank to score in the corner. In the 29th minute, loose forward Jon Dampney showed his strength in shrugging off a tackler to score in the corner. Connell made it two for the afternoon when Dampney took a quick throw, which saw the ball spread to the opposite sideline into the hands of Connell who crossed the line and scored. South Canterbury started the second half strong, and scored two tries in the first 10 minutes, to loose forward Eric Smith and Tafa got his second. Mid Canterbury were trailing 19–18 but were not about to give up. A try to second five-eighth Richard Fridd pulled them back into the game, while two more tries were scored by first five-eighth Dan Maw and Dampney who scored his second.

9 August 2008

Mid Canterbury	37–19	South Canterbury
Try: Brenton Connell (2); Jon Dampney (2); Richard Fridd; Dan Maw; Con: Dan Maw (2); Pen: Dan Maw		Try: Timaru Tafa (2); Eric Smith; Con: Luke Reihana (2)

Ashburton Showgrounds, Ashburton

Mid Canterbury retained the Hanan Shield until 2010.

16 August 2008

Mid Canterbury	35–21	North Otago

Ashburton Showgrounds, Ashburton

5 September 2009

South Canterbury	13–16	Mid Canterbury

Fraser Park, Timaru

26 September 2009

Mid Canterbury	30–21	North Otago

Ashburton Showgrounds, Ashburton

24 October 2009

Mid Canterbury	19–17	South Canterbury
	Meads Cup semifinal

Ashburton Showgrounds, Ashburton

21 August 2010

Mid Canterbury	28–3	South Canterbury

Ashburton Showgrounds, Ashburton

11 September 2010

Mid Canterbury	29–14	North Otago

Ashburton Showgrounds, Ashburton

== 2010 South Canterbury ==
In the last Hanan Shield challenge in the 2010 Heartland Championship, South Canterbury took the Shield from Mid Canterbury.

9 October 2010

Mid Canterbury	13–15	South Canterbury

Ashburton Showgrounds, Ashburton

== 2011 North Otago ==
In the first Hanan Shield challenge of the 2011 Heartland Championship, North Otago uplifted the Shield from South Canterbury. North Otago retained the Shield for one challenge.

17 September 2011

South Canterbury	16–17	North Otago

Fraser Park, Timaru

24 September 2011

North Otago	24–18	Mid Canterbury

Whitestone Contracting Stadium, Oamaru

== 2012 Mid Canterbury ==
Mid Canterbury claimed the Hanan Shield from North Otago with a 7–3 win on 8 September 2012.

8 September 2012
14:30 (NZST)

Mid Canterbury	7–3	North Otago
Try: Salave Misi; Con: Andrew Letham (1/1)	Report	Pen: Tai Aholelei (1)

Ashburton Showgrounds, Ashburton

== 2012 South Canterbury ==
On 13 October 2012 South Canterbury claimed the shield by defeating Mid Canterbury 17–15 at Fraser Park in Timaru. South Canterbury outscored their opponents by three tries to two.

13 October 2012
14:30 (NZST)

South Canterbury	17–15	Mid Canterbury
Try: Timaru Tafa; Trevathan; Liam Edwards; Con: Liam Edwards (1/3)	Report	Try: Tukulua Tolu (2); Con: Solomona Paraki (1/2); Pen: Solomona Paraki (1)

Fraser Park, Timaru

South Canterbury retained the shield by defeating Mid Canterbury 48–20 in the 2012 Lochore Cup semi-final on 21 October.

21 October 2012
14:30 (NZST)

South Canterbury	48–20	Mid Canterbury
Try: Stephen Burt; Sam Vea; Kali Latu; Tenare Saumani; Liam Edwards; Afala Tailega; Con: Liam Edwards (5/6); Pen: Liam Edwards (1)	Report	Try: Ben Kitching; Nick McKain; Jon Dampney; Con: Solomona Paraki (1/3); Pen: Solomona Paraki (1)

Fraser Park, Timaru

== 2013–2016 Mid Canterbury ==
Mid Canterbury won the Shield with a win 34–27 against South Canterbury on 21 September 2013.

21 September 2013
14:30 (NZST)

Mid Canterbury	34–27	South Canterbury
Try: Will McGoon; Esera Lauina; Richard Catherwood; Con: Murray Williams (2/3); Pen: Murray Williams (5)	Report	Try: Tenari Saumani; George Folau; Liam Edwards; Con: Liam Edwards (0/3); Pen: Liam Edwards (4)

Ashburton Showgrounds, Ashburton

Mid Canterbury defended the shield by defeating North Otago 26–20 in the 2013 Meads Cup final on 26 October. This was also Mid Canterbury's first time winning the Meads Cup.

26 October 2013
14:30 (NZST)

Mid Canterbury	26–20	North Otago
Try: Dwayne Burrows; Jon Dampney; Con: Murray Williams (2/2); Pen: Murray Williams (4)	Report	Try: J'ndre Liebenberg; Alex Brown; Con: Ed Keohane (2/2); Pen: Ed Keohane (2)

Ashburton Showgrounds, Ashburton

On 4 October 2014, Mid Canterbury defended the shield against North Otago in Ashburton. They won the match 28–7.

4 October 2014
14:30 (NZST)

Mid Canterbury	28–7	North Otago
Try: Richard Catherwood; Tevita Ula; Logan Bonnington; Con: Murray Williams (2/3); Pen: Murray Williams (3)	Report	Try: Siosiua Ngalo; Con: Ben Palmer (1/1)

Ashburton Showgrounds, Ashburton

On 11 October 2014, Mid Canterbury defended the shield against South Canterbury in Timaru, only one week after their match against North Otago. They won 24–7.

11 October 2014
14:30 (NZST)

South Canterbury	7–24	Mid Canterbury
Try: Paula Fifita; Con: Paula Fifita (1/1)	Report	Try: Jon Dampney; Brenton Connell; Tevita Ula; Jackson Donlan; Con: Murray Williams (2/4)

Fraser Park, Timaru

22 August 2015
14:30 (NZST)

Mid Canterbury	34–17	South Canterbury
Try: Murray Williams; Ashton Tuck; Mavae Tomasi; Ashton Tuck; Ewan Scott; Con: Murray Williams (3/5)	Report	Try: Kieran Coll; Matthew Kottier; Con: Jason Merrett (2/2)

Ashburton Showgrounds, Ashburton

In the last match of the regular season, Mid Canterbury successfully defended the Shield against North Otago in Oamaru.

10 October 2015
14:30 (NZST)

North Otago	36–39	Mid Canterbury
Try: Lemi Masoe; Sam Sturgess; Sali Halaeva; Aleki Morris; Cameron Keenan; Con: Ben Palmer (4/5); Pen: Ben Palmer	Report	Try: Matt Thatcher (2); Tama Tuirirangi; Seta Koroitamana; Ashton Tuck; Con: Andrew Letham (4/5); Pen: Andrew Letham (2)

Centennial Park, Oamaru

In the first match of the 2016 Heartland Championship season, Mid Canterbury defended the Shield for a sixth consecutive time. Mid Canterbury successfully defended the shield in a high-scoring affair.

27 August 2016
14:30 (NZST)

Mid Canterbury	40–32	North Otago
Try: Jarred Percival (2); Jon Dampney; Brendon Rigden; Timoci Nabakeke; Mike Lynch; Con: Jarred Percival (2/6)	Report	Try: Shay Tucker; Josh Casey; Joe Pickett; Simon Lilicama; Con: Carey (2/4)

Ashburton Showgrounds, Ashburton

== 2016 South Canterbury ==
On 15 October 2016, South Canterbury, on their home ground, won the Shield from Mid Canterbury. South Canterbury defended the Shield on four occasions throughout 2017 and 2018.

15 October 2016
14:30 (NZDT)

South Canterbury	14–0	Mid Canterbury

Fraser Park, Timaru

9 September 2017

Mid Canterbury	16–31	South Canterbury

Ashburton Showgrounds, Ashburton

23 September 2017

South Canterbury	36–29	North Otago

Fraser Park, Timaru

22 September 2018

South Canterbury	41–10	Mid Canterbury

Fraser Park, Timaru

6 October 2018

North Otago	22–41	South Canterbury

Centennial Park, Oamaru

== 2019 North Otago ==
On 24 August 2019, in an away fixture, North Otago ended the Shield reign of South Canterbury. North Otago defended the Shield in one challenge, against Mid Canterbury.

24 August 2019

South Canterbury	20–26	North Otago

Fraser Park, Timaru

5 October 2019

North Otago	34–10	Mid Canterbury

Centennial Park, Oamaru

== 2020–2025 South Canterbury ==
On 12 September 2020, South Canterbury won the Shield back from North Otago.

12 September 2020

North Otago	7–24	South Canterbury

Centennial Park, Oamaru

3 October 2020

South Canterbury	37–29	North Otago

Fraser Park, Timaru

16 October 2021

North Otago	27–33	South Canterbury

Centennial Park, Oamaru

30 October 2021

South Canterbury	43–22	Mid Canterbury

Fraser Park, Timaru

3 September 2022

South Canterbury	36–17	North Otago

Strathconan Park, Fairlie

1 October 2022

Mid Canterbury	13–36	South Canterbury

Ashburton Showgrounds, Ashburton

2 September 2023

North Otago	22–26	South Canterbury

Oamaru

23 September 2023

South Canterbury	50–35	Mid Canterbury

Apollo Projects Stadium, Christchurch

31 August 2024

Mid Canterbury	19–41	South Canterbury

Ashburton

14 September 2024

South Canterbury	44–31	North Otago

Temuka

== 2025 Mid Canterbury ==
On 13 September 2025, Mid Canterbury won the Shield from South Canterbury.

13 September 2025

South Canterbury	18-34	Mid Canterbury

Timaru

4 October 2025

Mid Canterbury	47-7	North Otago

Ashburton

== Combined Hanan Shield selections ==
A combined Mid Canterbury, North Otago and South Canterbury team has been selected to play touring international teams:

- On 9 June 1971, against the British Lions at Timaru, losing 6-25. Neville Twaddell (South Canterbury) scored 2 penalties.
- On 22 June 1977, against the British Lions at Timaru, losing 6-45. Doug Nicol (South Canterbury) scored 2 penalties.
- On 19 July 1989, against Argentina at Timaru, losing 6-17. Barry Fairbrother kicked a penalty and dropped goal.
- On 25 July 1990, against Australia at Timaru, losing 0-34.
- On 15 April 1992, against the World XV at Timaru, losing 3-74. Barry Fairbrother kicked a penalty.
- On 6 July 194, against the Springboks at Timaru, losing 19-67

The Hanan Shield team has also occasionally played against 1st division provincial teams, such as:

- Otago in 1989 (losing 13-38) and 1990 (4-26)
- Canterbury in 1989 (9-39).

== See also ==
- Ranfurly Shield
- Heartland Championship
- Rundle Cup played between Buller and West Coast
