= Horowhenua-Kapiti Rugby Football Union =

NZ rugby union governing body

Horowhenua-Kapiti

Club information
- Full name: Horowhenua-Kapiti Rugby Football Union Inc.
- Colours: Red, White, Blue
- Founded: 1893; 133 years ago
- Website: Official Website

Current details
- Ground: Levin Domain, Horowhenua
- Competition: Heartland Championship

The Horowhenua-Kapiti Rugby Football Union is the governing body for rugby union in the Horowhenua and Kāpiti Coast districts in the Manawatū-Whanganui and Wellington regions.

== History ==
The union was established in 1893 as the Horowhenua Rugby Football Union and was changed to its current name of Horowhenua-Kapiti in 1997, in order to reflect the full extent of the union's districts.

== Clubs ==
The union currently has nine member clubs, listed below. Foxton is the oldest club in the union, having been established in 1880, however it was not a permanent affiliate of the union until 1911.

- Athletic RFC
- College Old Boys RFC
- Foxton RFC
- Levin Wanderers RFC
- Paraparaumu RFC
- Rahui RFC
- Shannon RFC
- Toa RFC
- Waikanae RFC

=== Club champions ===
Ramsbotham Cup

- 2022 Waikanae 37 Shannon 32
- 2023 Rahui 23 Shannon 22
- 2024 Foxton 30 Rahui 27
- 2025 Foxton 58 Rahui 26
- 2026 Foxton 29 Paraparaumu 24

== Provincial representative rugby ==
Horowhenua-Kapiti currently compete in the Heartland Championship, an annual competition organised by the New Zealand Rugby Union for New Zealand's amateur unions. The team play out of Levin Domain in Horowhenua. Previously, Horowhenua-Kapiti competed in the lower divisions of the National Provincial Championship.

=== National Provincial Championship ===
The union won the National Provincial Championship (NPC) Third Division in 1993.

=== Heartland Championship ===
In 2018 the union won their second major honour to date, winning the 2018 Lochore Cup Final against Wairarapa Bush 26–23. 2018 was also the union's 125th anniversary, 25 years after their previous title in their centenary year in 1993.

A summary of Horowhenua-Kapiti's placings in the Heartland Championship is shown below:

Heartland Championship Results
| Year | Pld | W | D | L | PF | PA | PD | BP | Pts | Place | Playoffs | | |
| Year | Pld | W | D | L | PF | PA | PD | BP | Pts | Place | Qual | Semifinal | Final |
| 2006 | 8 | 2 | 1 | 5 | 163 | 257 | −94 | 3 | 13 | 6th | No | — | |
| 2007 | 8 | 1 | 0 | 7 | 164 | 260 | −96 | 2 | 6 | 12th | No | — | |
| 2008 | 8 | 3 | 2 | 3 | 234 | 174 | +60 | 5 | 21 | 7th | Lochore Cup | Won 37–17 against Wairarapa Bush | Lost 5–26 to Poverty Bay |
| 2009 | 8 | 4 | 0 | 4 | 193 | 166 | +27 | 3 | 19 | 5th | No | — | |
| 2010 | 8 | 3 | 0 | 5 | 167 | 186 | −19 | 3 | 15 | 8th | Lochore Cup | Lost 14–19 to Buller | — |
| 2011 | 8 | 1 | 0 | 7 | 98 | 326 | −228 | 1 | 5 | 12th | No | — | |
| 2012 | 8 | 2 | 0 | 6 | 124 | 238 | −114 | 1 | 9 | 12th | No | — | |
| 2013 | 8 | 1 | 0 | 7 | 141 | 182 | −41 | 6 | 10 | 11th | No | — | |
| 2014 | 8 | 5 | 2 | 1 | 169 | 121 | +48 | 2 | 26 | 4th | Meads Cup | Lost 15–22 to Buller | — |
| 2015 | 8 | 4 | 0 | 4 | 263 | 261 | +2 | 7 | 23 | 5th | Lochore Cup | Lost 12–57 to North Otago | — |
| 2016 | 8 | 2 | 1 | 5 | 224 | 260 | −36 | 5 | 15 | 9th | No | — | |
| 2017 | 8 | 7 | 0 | 1 | 259 | 154 | +105 | 4 | 32 | 2nd | Meads Cup | Won 18–17 against Buller | Lost 14–30 to Wanganui |
| 2018 | 8 | 4 | 0 | 4 | 246 | 251 | -5 | 8 | 24 | 5th | Lochore Cup | Won 34–24 against Mid Canterbury | Won 26–23 against Wairarapa Bush |
| 2019 | 8 | 3 | 0 | 5 | 184 | 250 | -66 | 5 | 17 | 9th | No | — | |
| 2021 | 8 | 5 | 0 | 3 | 214 | 197 | 17 | 4 | 24 | 7th | No | — | |
| 2022 | 8 | 4 | 0 | 4 | 218 | 298 | -80 | 4 | 20 | 6th | Lochore Cup | Lost 30-37 to East Coast | — |
| 2023 | 8 | 2 | 0 | 6 | 176 | 297 | -121 | 3 | 11 | 12th | No | — | |
| 2024 | 8 | 4 | 0 | 4 | 244 | 289 | -45 | 6 | 22 | 6th | Lochore Cup | Lost 51-52 to Wairarapa Bush | — |
| 2025 | 8 | 4 | 0 | 4 | 242 | 221 | +21 | 1 | 21 | 8th | Lochore Cup | Won 40-18 against Whanganui | Lost 47-64 to North Otago |
| 2026 | 8 | 5 | 0 | 3 | 310 | 251 | +59 | 8 | 28 | 6th | Lochore Cup | Lost 38-39 to Whanganui | — |

There was no Heartland Championship in 2020 due to Covid 19 restrictions.

=== Ranfurly Shield ===
Horowhenua-Kapiti have never held the Ranfurly Shield but had two successful challenges in 1927 when the union was amalgamated with Manawatu as Manawhenua. In 2007 Horowhenua-Kapiti had a challenge against North Harbour, but were outclassed throughout the match, losing 99–6. Other challenges include:

| 14 July 2007 | North Harbour | 99-6 | Horowhenua-Kapiti | North Harbour Stadium, Albany |

| 18 July 2013 | Waikato | 85–0 | Horowhenua-Kapiti | Campbell Park, Morrinsville |
| 18:00 (NZST) | Try: Whetu Douglas; Joe Webber (4); Brendon Leonard; Dylan Collier (2); Romana Graham; Brian Alainu'uese; Glen Robertson (2); Hame Faiva; Con: Trent Renata (6); Wharenui Hawera; Dylan Collier | Report | | Attendance: 3,000 |

| 16 July 2015 | Hawke's Bay | 50–16 | Horowhenua-Kapiti | McLean Park, Napier |
| 19:35 (NZST) | Try: Joseph Penitito (2); Tony Lamborn; Shannan Chase; Tom Stanley; Mark Braidwood; Con: Tyrone Elkington-MacDonald (4); Pen: Tyrone Elkington-MacDonald (4) | Report | Try: Sam Gardner; Con: Perry Hayman (1/1); Pen: Perry Hayman (3) | Referee: Paul Williams |

=== Other teams ===
In addition to the Heartland Championship side, the union fields a number of age-grade and women's representative teams, including a High-Performance Unit for local club and school players.

== Super Rugby ==
Horowhenua-Kapiti along with Wellington, Wairarapa Bush, Wanganui, Manawatu, Hawke's Bay and Poverty Bay fall within the Hurricanes (formerly Wellington Hurricanes) catchment. In 2013, the union purchased a three percent stake in the company which operates the team, Hurricanes' Investment Ltd, with a $100,000 contribution.

== All Blacks ==
There have only been two players selected for the All Blacks while playing for Horowhenua-Kapiti:

- Hohepa Jacob (All Black number 220) who played 8 matches and scored 25 points for New Zealand on the 1920 tour of New South Wales as a Wing Forward/Loose forward. Jacob was also a 2nd Lieutenant in the New Zealand (Māori) Pioneer Battalion during World War I and was awarded the Military Cross in the 1919 King's Birthday Honours
- Joe Karam (All Black number 713) who played 10 tests and another 32 games for New Zealand between 1972 and 1975 scoring 345 points (65 in tests). Joe Karam later played for the Glenora Bears and the Auckland rugby league team. He also waged a successful campaign to overturn the murder conviction of David Bain.

Carlos Spencer played for the union between 1992 and 1993 before moving to Auckland and Christian Cullen played for the union in 1994 before moving to Manawatu. Dane Coles and Codie Taylor played their junior rugby in Horowhenua-Kapiti making the age grade teams, while Codie Taylor also represented the Horowhenua-Kapiti sevens team.
