= Owen Delany Park =

Stadium in Taupō

- Interactive map of Owen Delany Park
- Location: Taupō, New Zealand
- Coordinates: 38°40′9″S 176°5′53″E
- Owner: Taupō District Council
- Capacity: Concerts: 30,000; Rugby: 20,000; Cricket: 15,000
- Surface: Grass (Main Stadium); Bitumen (Cycling, Netball)

Construction
- Opened: 1983

Tenants
- King Country Rams; Northern Districts Knights

Ground information
- Country: New Zealand
- End names
- North End; Lake Taupō End

International information
- First men's ODI: 9 January 1999: New Zealand v India
- Last men's ODI: 2 January 2001: New Zealand v Zimbabwe
- As of 8 January 2016; Source: ESPNcricinfo

Owen Delany Park is a multi-purpose sports stadium in Taupō, New Zealand. The main sports played there are rugby and cricket, although several other sports are accommodated on a permanent basis and numerous other events on a one-off basis.

== History ==
The park is named for Owen Delany, who was a major figure in the Taupō sporting scene from 1953, when he formed the United Wanderers Cricket Club. In 1954 he reformed the Taupō Rugby Football club. The Taupō council named the new sports ground Owen Delany Park in recognition of the time and effort Delany had put into the establishment of the park and also his involvement in sport in Taupō over the previous thirty years. Delany attended the first One Day International held at the ground in 1999. In the 1995 Queen's Birthday Honours, Owen Delany was appointed a Member of the Order of the British Empire, for services to sport.

== Ground ==
The park itself covers several hectares of land on the north-eastern outskirts of Taupō. The main stadium contains a partially covered grandstand with 90 percent of the remaining perimeter formed as a raised grass embankment. The playing surface contains a Rugby field with a cricket pitch in the centre and a grass athletics track forming the boundary. A further two levels of grass surface provide up to five rugby fields and three artificial cricket pitches.

There is also an indoor stadium which houses a gymnastics facility, as well as an outdoor bitumen velodrome and outdoor netball courts. There are also a dog obedience facility and numerous sports club buildings in the park.

== Usage ==
=== Primary ===
The King Country Rugby Union and the Northern Districts Cricket Association each use the ground several times a year for matches involving their premier teams and also use the facility for junior teams, training and development.

In 1994 King Country hosted the South African Rugby team in the first match of their tour of New Zealand. This was South Africa's first game in New Zealand since the controversial 1981 tour.

In 1999, 2000 and 2001 the New Zealand cricket team played One Day International games at the park using the lights for the day-night fixtures.

For the past several seasons Owen Delany Park has played host to the Jock Hobbs Memorial National Under 19 Tournament (2014–present), it will continue to host the tournament until 2021

=== Secondary ===
Various local sports clubs utilise the park on a weekly and seasonal basis providing competition on local and national levels.

Several local rugby clubs use this as their home ground, including Taupo Marist, Taupo Sports and Taupo United.

The main stadium has been configured numerous times to host other sports such as association football, Rugby league and archery. Concerts and other public and social events are also held at the ground when a larger sized venue is required.

== International centuries ==
In the three ODIs that have been played at the venue one century has been scored, with Indian player Rahul Dravid making 123 not out against New Zealand in January 1999.
