= Meads Cup =

New Zealand rugby union trophy

The Meads Cup is a rugby union trophy named after King Country and All Blacks player Colin Meads. It is contested during the Heartland Championship. It was first awarded in 2006, when the Heartland Championship format was introduced.

== Competition ==
=== Regular season ===
At present, all 12 Heartland Championship teams play 8 games over 8 weeks before the finals. Once finished, the top 4 advance to the Meads Cup finals. The teams ranked 5–8 play for the Lochore Cup. Previously, a pool system was used between 2006 and 2010.

=== Finals ===
The Meads Cup winner is determined in four-team single-elimination tournament. The semi-final matchups are seeded 1–4 and 2–3, with the higher seed receiving home field advantage. The highest remaining seed hosts the Meads Cup final.

== Winners ==
Year	Winner	Score	Runner-up
2006	Wairarapa Bush	16–14	Wanganui
2007	North Otago	25–8	Wanganui
2008	Wanganui	27–12	Mid Canterbury
2009	Wanganui	34–13	Mid Canterbury
2010	North Otago	39–18	Wanganui
2011	Wanganui	30–10	East Coast
2012	East Coast	29–27	Wanganui
2013	Mid Canterbury	26–20	North Otago
2014	Mid Canterbury	36–13	Buller
2015	Whanganui	28–11	South Canterbury
2016	Whanganui	20–18	Buller
2017	Whanganui	30–14	Horowhenua-Kapiti
2018	Thames Valley	17–12	South Canterbury
2019	North Otago	33–19	Whanganui
2021	South Canterbury	35–16	Thames Valley
2022	South Canterbury	47–36	Whanganui
2023	South Canterbury	40–30	Whanganui
2024	Thames Valley	37–29	Mid Canterbury
2025	Mid Canterbury	21-18	Thames Valley
2026	King Country	24-14	Mid Canterbury

In 2020 no competition was held due to COVID-19.

== See also ==
- Hanan Shield competed for by Mid Canterbury, North Otago and South Canterbury
- Heartland Championship
- Lochore Cup
- National Provincial Championship (1976–2005)
- National Provincial Championship (2006–present)
- New Zealand Heartland XV
- Rundle Cup played between Buller and West Coast
