= Cooks Gardens =

Stadium in Wanganui, New Zealand

Coordinates: 39.9341°S 175.0493°E

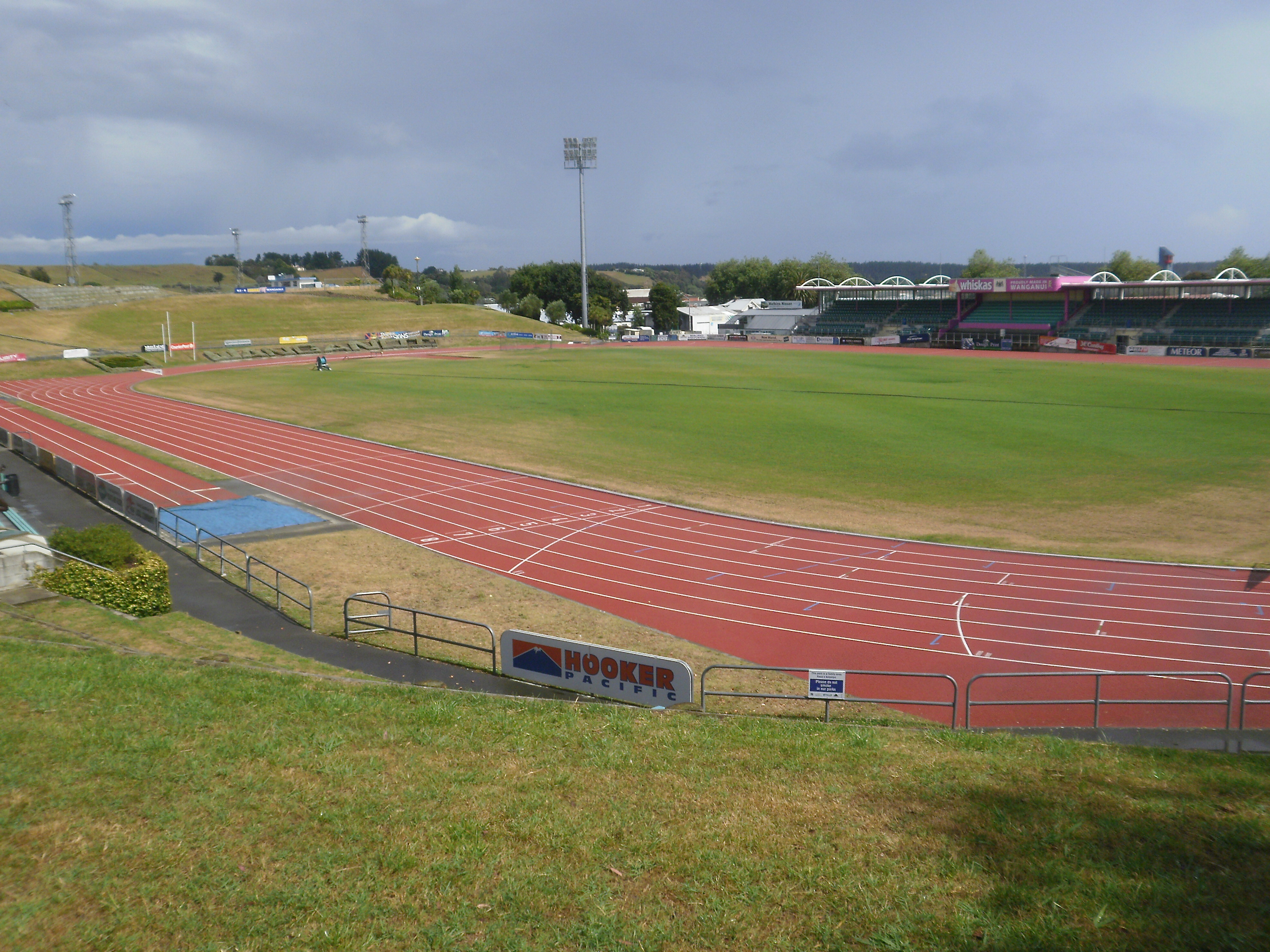
- Interactive map of Cooks Gardens
- Location: Hill Street, Wanganui, New Zealand
- Operator: Cooks Gardens Trust Board
- Capacity: 21,000
- Surface: Grass field, synthetic athletics track

Construction
- Opened: 1896

Tenants
- Wanganui Rugby Football Union, Athletics Wanganui, Cycling Wanganui

Ground information

International information
- Only women's Test: 6–10 January 1992: New Zealand v England
- Only women's ODI: 20 January 1982: England v India
- As of 1 September 2020; Source: CricketArchive

Cooks Gardens is a multi-purpose stadium in Wanganui, New Zealand. It is currently used mostly for rugby union matches, athletics and cycling. The main stadium, known as Westpac Stadium, is able to hold 20,700 people with 3,500 covered seats.

== History ==
Cooks Gardens use as a sporting facility commenced in 1896. Since then Cooks Gardens has been the venue of a number of the world's historic sporting occasions. One of these occasions was on 27 January 1962 when tens of thousands of spectators crammed into Cooks Gardens to witness athlete Peter Snell break the world record for the mile. Since then, the four minute mile has been broken 63 times at Cooks Gardens by 41 athletes from various countries around the world.

In 1996 a multimillion-dollar re-development of Cooks Gardens took place. This included an all-weather synthetic 400m athletic track, the first wooden cycling velodrome in New Zealand, and a new grandstand. Redevelopment of Cooks Gardens was completed in 2004 with the construction of two further grandstands.

The ground was also used for cricket from the 1890s until the 1990s. Central Districts used it as one of their home grounds from the 1950s to the 1990s, staging 17 first-class and eight List A matches there. A women's Test match was held there in February 1992, when New Zealand played England.

== Features ==
- Cooks Gardens Event Centre is the hub of Cooks Gardens and contains the playing field and athletics track and has a capacity of 20,700 with 3,500 covered seats in the grandstands. The stadium hosts all Wanganui Heartland Championship home rugby matches. Many National and International athletic meets are held at Cooks Gardens.
- The Velodrome contains a 250m wooden track and has hosted several International cycling meets.
- The Function Centre contains a bar and kitchen facilities.
- Clock Tower, rebuilt in 1891, replacing the original one on the site of the old Rutland Stockade on Rutland Hill (modern day Queen's Park), one of the town’s defenses dating back to the 1850s. The original fire bell, a Sheffield bell dated 1874, is still in this tower. Four clock bells, manufactured by John Taylor and Co., Loughborough, England in 1903, moved into this tower after the 1930s earthquakes, which destroyed the post office clock tower in Victoria Avenue. The clock bells still ring at every 15 minutes today.

== Notable people ==
- Peter Snell, 1962 World record
