= Memorial Park, Masterton =

Sports venue in Masterton, New Zealand

Trust House Memorial Park
- Interactive map of Trust House Memorial Park
- Former names: Cameron and Soldiers' Park (1918–2008)
- Location: Masterton, Wellington region, New Zealand
- Coordinates: 40.9568°S 175.6548°E
- Owner: Wairarapa Bush
- Capacity: 10,000
- Surface: Turf

Construction
- Groundbreaking: 1918
- Renovated: 2015

Tenants
- Wairarapa Bush (Heartland Championship); Wairarapa United (Central League); Hurricanes Development team

Memorial Park, also known as Trust House Memorial Park for sponsorship reasons and formerly as Cameron and Soldiers' Park, is a sports facility which is located in Masterton, Wellington region, New Zealand. The two main sports that are played on the ground are rugby and football. It has a capacity for 10,000 spectators.

It is the home ground of Heartland Championship side Wairarapa Bush Rugby Football Union.

== History ==
External image
- Image of Cameron and Soldiers' Park in 1969.

The previous Masterton showground was acquired by a local committee in 1918. Brothers Donald and Robert Cameron acquired the land for Memorial Park and the park commemorated their last name and their father and uncle Lieutenant Norman Cameron, killed at Gallipoli.

The grandstand was blown by a storm in 1934, and during the Second World War the grounds were used by the New Zealand Army.

In 2008 the park was renamed Trust House Memorial Park for sponsorship reasons. In 2015 at the cost of NZ $2.1 million the park was renovated to add a turf ground, stadium lighting and redesigned fence lines and footpaths.

== Tenants ==
Rugby union team Wairarapa Bush uses Memorial Park for all its home games. It has also been the home ground on some occasions for the Hurricanes Development team.

In association football, Wairarapa United use the home ground for their home games. Wairarapa United won the Chatham Cup, New Zealand's most coveted football trophy, in 2011.

== See also ==
- Wairarapa Bush Rugby Football Union
- Heartland Championship
