= John Sturgeon Park =

Sports ground in Greymouth, New Zealand

Coordinates: 42°27′57″S 171°11′47″E

John Sturgeon Park, formerly called Rugby Park, is a sports ground in Greymouth, New Zealand. It is the home ground of the West Coast Rugby Football Union, and has a capacity of 6,000, although the record attendance figure of 11,000 was set in 1959, when the West Coast-Buller combined side played the touring British Isles side.

In 2018, the ground's name was changed from Rugby Park to John Sturgeon Park, in honour of former All Blacks manager John Sturgeon. John Sturgeon was appointed a Member of the Order of the British Empire, for services to sport, in particular rugby, in the 1992 Queen's Birthday Honours, and an Officer of the New Zealand Order of Merit, for services to rugby, in the 2012 Queen's Birthday and Diamond Jubilee Honours. He was also made a life member of the New Zealand Rugby Union in 2012.
