= Fraser Park (Timaru) =

Sports stadium in Timaru, New Zealand

Alpine Energy Stadium
- Interactive map of Alpine Energy Stadium
- Former names: Fraser Park
- Location: 328 Church Street, West End, Timaru, New Zealand
- Coordinates: 44°23′48″S 171°13′35″E
- Capacity: 12,500
- Surface: Grass

Alpine Energy Stadium, originally called Fraser Park, is a sports stadium in Timaru, New Zealand. It is currently used mostly for rugby union matches. The stadium is able to hold 12,000 people or 12,500 with temporary seating.

== History ==
The South Canterbury Amateur Athletic Club purchased land on Otipua Road in 1871 and developed it for athletics. In 1876 it became the home of South Canterbury rugby. It also staged cricket and trotting events. Originally called the South Canterbury Amateur Athletic Club Grounds, it was renamed Fraser Park in 1926, and Alpine Energy Stadium in 1995. That same year, overhead floodlights were installed for night games at the park.

== Tenants ==
The stadium is the home ground of the South Canterbury Rugby Team, who play in the Heartland Championship.

== Stadium ==
The stadium had two main stands until April 2016 the east stand was closed permanently due to damage. Otherwise, the stadium is surrounded by embankment.

== Temporary site for games from Christchurch ==
In the wake of the February 2011 Christchurch earthquake, the Christchurch Super Rugby team, the Crusaders, moved two Super 15 seasonal games (versus the Bulls and the Blues) to Alpine Energy Stadium.
