= 2010 Heartland Championship =

Amateur rugby union competition in New Zealand

- Date: 28 August 2010–31 October 2010
- Countries: New Zealand

Final positions
- Champions: North Otago (Meads Cup); Wairarapa Bush (Lochore Cup)
- Runner-up: Wanganui (Meads Cup); Buller (Lochore Cup)

The 2010 Heartland Championship was the fifth edition of the New Zealand provincial rugby union competition, since the 2006 reconstruction. The teams represented the 12 amateur rugby unions.

In Round 1, the teams were split into two pools of 6 teams in a round-robin format (30 games, from 30 August to 25 September).

In Round 2, the first three teams in each pool of Round 1 competed for the Meads Cup, the others competed for the Lochore Cup. Each team met the teams from the other pool of Round 1 in a round-robin format (18 games, from 2 October to 16 October). The first four teams in Round 2 went on to the semifinals, the winners of which went on to the grand final on 31 October.

The winning teams were North Otago in the Meads Cup, and Wairarapa-Bush in the Lochore Cup.

== Round 1 ==
=== Pool A ===
Qualified for Meads Cup
Qualified for Lochore Cup

Pos	Team	Pld	W	D	L	PF	PA	PD	TF	TA	TD	BP1	BP2	Pts
1	Wanganui	5	5	0	0	159	76	83	23	8	15	3	0	23
2	South Canterbury	5	4	0	1	107	76	31	9	7	2	0	1	17
3	Thames Valley	5	3	0	2	102	76	26	10	9	1	1	2	15
4	Horowhenua-Kapiti	5	1	0	4	97	121	−24	12	15	−3	1	1	6
5	King Country	5	1	0	4	76	119	−43	9	15	−6	0	2	6
6	West Coast	4	1	0	4	77	150	−73	10	19	−9	0	0	4

==== Week 1 ====
28 August 2010
14:00

(BP) Thames Valley	36–18	West Coast
Try: Sam Ward, David Harrison, Alan McLean, Barton Thompson; Con: David Harrison (2); Pen: David Harrison (4)	Report	Try: Tom Gilmore, Maleli Mudu; Con: Willie Brown; Pen: Luke Hughes (2)

Paeroa

28 August 2010
14:30

King Country	17–12	Horowhenua-Kapiti (BP)
Try: James Hemara (2); Con: Tanner Vili (2); Pen: Tanner Vili	Report	Try: Gary Phelps, Josh Hamilton; Con: Josh Hamilton

Te Kūiti

28 August 2010
14:30

Wanganui	13–6	South Canterbury (BP)
Try: Sam Scown; Con: Mark Davis; Pen: Mark Davis (2)	Report	Pen: Jason Merrett (2)

Wanganui

==== Week 2 ====
4 September 2010
14:30

Horowhenua-Kapiti	16–30	Wanganui (BP)
Try: Manaia Osborne; Con: Nick Cooper; Pen: Manaia Osborne (2), Mahi Gibson	Report	Try: Cole Baldwin (2), Taukorea Moeke, Ace Malo, Cameron Crowley; Con: Mark Davis; Pen: Mark Davis

Levin

4 September 2010
14:30

West Coast	13–8	King Country (BP)
Try: Rowan O'Gorman; Con: Luke Hughes; Pen: Luke Hughes (2)	Report	Try: Sam Holder; Pen: Jared Murrell

Greymouth

4 September 2010
14:30

South Canterbury	13–9	Thames Valley (BP)
Try: Tevita Latu; Con: Jason Merrett; Pen: Jason Merrett (2)	Report	Pen: David Harrison (3)

Timaru

==== Week 3 ====
11 September 2010
14:00

Thames Valley	14–5	King Country
Try: Manaia Taotala; Pen: David Harrison (2); Drop: Sam Clark	Report	Try: Lolohea Loco

Paeroa

11 September 2010
14:30

(BP) Wanganui	41–15	West Coast
Try: Sam Scown, Cameron Crowley, Mark Davis, Adam Roe, John Smyth, Darren Munro; Con: Mark Davis (4); Pen: Mark Davis	Report	Try: Brad Houston, Christian Tupuola; Con: Luke Hughes; Pen: Luke Hughes

Wanganui

11 September 2010
14:30

South Canterbury	34–13	Horowhenua-Kapiti
Try: Eric Smith, Hamish Westgarth, Tanu Suavine; Con: Jason Merrett (2); Pen: Jason Merrett (5)	Report	Try: Josh Hamilton; Con: Nick Cooper; Pen: Nick Cooper (2)

Timaru

==== Week 4 ====
18 September 2010
13:45

Horowhenua-Kapiti	17–26	Thames Valley
Try: James Ross, Mahe Gibson; Con: Josh Hamilton (2); Pen: Josh Hamilton	Report	Try: Manaia Taotala, Alan McLean, Glen Townsend; Con: David Harrison; Pen: David Harrison (3)

Foxton

18 September 2010
14:30

King Country	22–52	Wanganui (BP)
Try: Shaun Burr, Fale Pule, Rob Sherson; Con: Tanner Vili (2); Pen: Tanner Vili	Report	Try: Darren Munro (3), Taukorea Moeke (2), Shaun McDonough, Ace Malo, Johnny Mow; Con: Mark Davis (6)

Taupō

18 September 2010
14:30

West Coast	17–26	South Canterbury
Try: Rowan O'Gorman, Maleli Mudu, Brad Houston; Con: Luke Hughes	Report	Try: Jonathan Direen, Hamish Westgarth; Con: Jason Merrett (2); Pen: Jason Merrett (4)

Greymouth

==== Week 5 ====
25 September 2010
14:30

South Canterbury	28–24	King Country (BP)
Try: Tevita Latu (2), Simon Murray; Con: Jason Merrett (2); Pen: Jason Merrett (3)	Report	Try: Jared Murrell, James Hemara; Con: Tanner Vili; Pen: Tanner Vili (4)

Timaru

25 September 2010
14:30

(BP) Horowhenua-Kapiti	39–14	West Coast
Try: Josh Hamilton (4), Michael Papps, Clayton Winiata; Con: Josh Hamilton (3); Pen: Josh Hamilton	Report	Try: Rowan O'Gorman (2); Con: Luke Hughes (2)

Paraparaumu

25 September 2010
14:30

Wanganui	23–17	Thames Valley
Try: Ace Malo (2), Fraser Hammond; Con: Mark Davis; Pen: Mark Davis (2)	Report	Try: Glen Strange, Vesi Rauluni; Con: David Harrison (2); Pen: David Harrison

Wanganui

=== Pool B ===
Qualified for Meads Cup
Qualified for Lochore Cup

Pos	Team	Pld	W	D	L	PF	PA	PD	TF	TA	TD	BP1	BP2	Pts
1	Mid Canterbury	5	4	0	1	150	85	65	21	10	11	4	1	21
2	North Otago	5	4	0	1	243	80	163	33	9	24	4	0	20
3	Poverty Bay	5	4	0	1	187	82	105	27	8	19	2	0	18
4	Wairarapa Bush	5	2	0	3	99	151	−52	10	19	−9	1	0	9
5	Buller	5	1	0	4	79	127	−48	8	16	−8	0	1	5
6	East Coast	5	0	0	5	44	277	−233	4	41	−37	0	0	0

==== Week 1 ====
28 August 2010
14:00

(BP) Mid Canterbury	20–25	Poverty Bay
Try: James McLeod, Vesi Luatua; Con: Davey Maw (2); Pen: Davey Maw (2)	Report	Try: Kahu Tamatea, John Stewart (2); Con: Kahu Tamatea (2); Pen: Kahu Tamatea (2)

Ashburton

28 August 2010
14:30

(BP) Buller	16–23	Wairarapa Bush
Try: Joseph Bradley; Con: Andrew Stephens; Pen: Andrew Stephens (3)	Report	Try: Sam Mitchell; Pen: Jeremy Te Huia (6)

Westport

28 August 2010
14:30

East Coast	3–116	North Otago (BP)
Pen: Nathan Langsford	Report	Try: Luke Herden (5), Sione Pangata (3), Kasanova Soane (2), Hamish McKenzie (2), Dave Simpson, Palanapa Mafi, Josh Collier, Kilifi Fangupo, Ekeroma Sefo; Con: Ben Patston (9), Billy Guyton (5); Pen: Ben Patston

Ruatoria

==== Week 2 ====
4 September 2010
14:30

Wairarapa Bush	17–30	Mid Canterbury (BP)
Try: Cyrus Baker, Nick Olson; Con: Jeremy Te Huia (2); Pen: Jeremy Te Huia	Report	Try: Chris Crichton (2), Richard Catherwood, Tim Perry; Con: Davey Maw (2); Pen: Davey Maw (2)

Masterton

4 September 2010
14:30

(BP) North Otago	44–20	Buller
Try: Tevita Fifita (2), Faaitu Tuamoheloa, Josh Collier, Hamish McKenzie, Luke Herden; Con: Ben Patston (2), Billy Guyton (2); Pen: Ben Patston (2)	Report	Try: Pene Navainabalu, Rory Kennedy; Con: Andrew Stephens, Ricki Jacobs; Pen: Andrew Stephens (2)

Oamaru

4 September 2010
14:30

(BP) Poverty Bay	71–3	East Coast
Try: John Stewart (3), Whaimotu Craft-Chemis, Pomare Samupo, Mario Counsell, Lennon Carrington, Karl Gemmell-Clarke, Colin Hovell, Lloyd Gabriel, Kahu Tamatea; Con: Kahu Tamatea (8)	Report	Pen: Tojo Maaka

Gisborne

==== Week 3 ====
11 September 2010
14:00

East Coast	7–18	Buller
Try: Verdon Bartlett; Con: Lance Maaka	Report	Try: Brad Mackenzie, Joseph Bradley; Con: Andrew Stephens; Pen: Andrew Stephens (2)

Ruatoria

11 September 2010
14:30

(BP) Poverty Bay	62–6	Wairarapa Bush
Try: John Stewart (3), Stan Williams (2), Whaimotu Craft-Chemis, Colin Hovell, Lloyd Gabriel, Murray Hewson; Con: Kahu Tamatea (7); Pen: Kahu Tamatea	Report	Pen: Jeremy Te Huia (2)

Gisborne

11 September 2010
14:30

(BP) Mid Canterbury	29–14	North Otago
Try: Chris Crichton (3), Vesi Luatua; Con: Davey Maw (3); Pen: Davey Maw	Report	Try: Rangi Hepi; Pen: Ben Patston (3)

Ashburton

==== Week 4 ====
18 September 2010
14:30

Buller	12–32	Mid Canterbury (BP)
Try: Pene Navainabalu, James Foster; Con: Andrew Stephens	Report	Try: Chris Crichton, Tim Perry, Hayden Dwyer, Nick McKain, Emorio Ludoviko; Con: Davey Maw (2); Pen: Davey Maw

Westport

18 September 2010
14:30

(BP) Wairarapa Bush	33–14	East Coast
Try: Mana Faraimo (2), Tommy Sargent, Joe Harwood, Jeremy Te Huia; Con: Jeremy Te Huia (4)	Report	Try: Verdon Bartlett; Pen: Nathan Langsford (2); Drop: Norman Hauiti

Masterton

18 September 2010
14:30

(BP) North Otago	40–8	Poverty Bay
Try: Tevita Fifita, Luke Herden, Josh Collier, Dylan Winter, Greg Zampach; Con: Ben Patston (3); Pen: Ben Patston (3)	Report	Try: John Stewart; Pen: Kahu Tamatea

Oamaru

==== Week 5 ====
25 September 2010
14:30

(BP) Mid Canterbury	39–17	East Coast
Try: Richard Catherwood (2), Mark Grieve-Dunn, Kody Nordqvist, Vesi Luatua, Vinnie Booiman; Con: Davey Maw (3); Pen: Davey Maw	Report	Try: Charlie Harrison, Toamasi Coka; Con: Nathan Langsford (2); Pen: Nathan Langsford

Ashburton

25 September 2010
14:30

Poverty Bay	21–13	Buller
Try: Tom Teaeki, Murray Hewson, Whaimotu Craft-Chemis; Con: Tim Gardner (2), Kahu Tamatea	Report	Try: Phillip Rossiter; Con: Andrew Stephens; Pen: Andrew Stephens (2)

Gisborne

25 September 2010
14:30

Wairarapa Bush	20–29	North Otago (BP)
Try: Junior Togia, Joss Tua-Davidson; Con: Jeremy Te-Huia (2); Pen: Jeremy Te-Huia (2)	Report	Try: Greg Zampach (2), Luke Herden, Tevita Fifita; Con: Billy Guyton (2), Ben Patston; Pen: Billy Guyton

Masterton

=== Statistics ===
Pool stage top point scorers
Player	Team	Tries	Conversions	Penalties	Drop goals	Total
Kahu Tamatea	Poverty Bay	2	18	4	0	58
David Harrison	Thames Valley	1	5	13	0	54
Jeremy Te Huia	Wairarapa Bush	1	8	11	0	54
Jason Merrett	South Canterbury	0	16	7	0	53
Ben Patston	North Otago	0	15	7	0	51
Mark Davis	Wanganui	1	13	6	0	49
Josh Hamilton	Horowhenua-Kapiti	6	6	2	0	48
John Stewart	Poverty Bay	9	0	0	0	45
Luke Herden	North Otago	8	0	0	0	40
Andrew Stephens	Buller	0	5	9	0	37

== Round 2 ==
=== Meads Cup Pool ===
Qualified for semifinals

Pos	Team	Pld	W	D	L	PF	PA	PD	TF	TA	TD	BP1	BP2	Pts
1	Wanganui	6	6	0	0	209	110	99	30	13	17	4	0	28
2	Mid Canterbury	6	5	0	1	179	94	85	23	10	13	4	1	25
3	North Otago	6	5	0	1	286	94	192	40	11	29	5	0	25
4	Poverty Bay	6	4	0	2	221	132	89	32	15	17	3	0	19
5	South Canterbury	6	4	0	2	121	119	2	11	14	−3	0	1	17
6	Thames Valley	6	3	0	3	111	105	6	10	11	−1	1	2	15

==== Week 6 ====
2 October 2010
14:30

(BP) Wanganui	50–34	Poverty Bay (BP)
Try: John Mow (2), Cole Baldwin (2), Ace Malo, Denning Tyrell, Adam Roe; Con: Mark Davis (6); Pen: Mark Davis	Report	Try: Tom Teaki (2), Whaimotu Craft-Chemis, Tevita Maka, Pomare Samupo; Con: Kahu Tamatea, Tim Gardner (2); Pen: Kahu Tamatea

Wanganui

2 October 2010
14:30

Mid Canterbury	29–9	Thames Valley
Try: Matt Ryan, Chris Crichton; Con: Davey Maw (2); Pen: Davey Maw (5)	Report	Pen: David Harrison (3)

Ashburton

2 October 2010
14:30

(BP) North Otago	43–14	South Canterbury
Try: Billy Guyton (3), Tevita Fifita (2), Luke Herden, Kilifi Fangupo; Con: Ben Patston (4)	Report	Try: Matt Hayes, Nick Strachan; Con: Jason Merrett (2)

Oamaru

==== Week 7 ====
9 October 2010
14:30

North Otago	21–16	Wanganui

Oamaru

9 October 2010
14:30

Mid Canterbury	13–15	South Canterbury

Ashburton

9 October 2010
14:30

Poverty Bay	45–18	Thames Valley

Gisborne

==== Week 8 ====
16 October 2010
14:00

Thames Valley	26–38	North Otago

Oamaru

16 October 2010
14:30

South Canterbury	14–16	Poverty Bay

Timaru

16 October 2010
14:30

Wanganui	29–3	Mid Canterbury

Wanganui

=== Lochore Cup Pool ===
Qualified for semifinals

Pos	Team	Pld	W	D	L	PF	PA	PD	TF	TA	TD	BP1	BP2	Pts
1	King Country	6	2	0	4	122	128	−6	15	15	0	1	2	11
2	Wairarapa Bush	6	2	0	4	129	186	−57	13	23	−10	2	1	11
3	Buller	6	2	0	4	102	138	−36	9	17	−8	0	1	9
4	West Coast	6	2	0	4	112	180	−68	14	22	−8	1	0	9
5	Horowhenua-Kapiti	6	1	0	5	108	144	−36	13	16	−3	1	1	6
6	East Coast	6	0	0	6	53	323	−270	4	47	−43	0	0	0

==== Week 6 ====
2 October 2010
14:30

(BP) Wairarapa Bush	30–35	West Coast (BP)
Try: Jesse McGilvary (2), Mana Faraimo; Con: Jeremy Te Huia (3); Pen: Jeremy Te Huia (3)	Report	Try: Luke Hughes, Brad Houston, Sam Hannah, Simon Bourke; Con: Luke Hughes (3); Pen: Luke Hughes (3)

Masterton

2 October 2010
14:30

(BP) King Country	45–9	East Coast
Try: Sam Mason (2), Rob Sherson (2), Lolohea Loco, Jared Murrell; Con: Tanner Vili (5), Jared Murrell; Pen: Tanner Vili	Report	Pen: Nathan Langsford (3)

Taupō

2 October 2010
14:30

Horowhenua-Kapiti	11–23	Buller
Try: Josh Hamilton; Pen: Sam Gibson; Drop: Josh Hamilton	Report	Try: Brad MacKenzie; Pen: Andrew Stephens (6)

Levin

==== Week 7 ====
9 October 2010
14:30

Horowhenua-Kapiti	31–17	Wairarapa Bush

Levin

9 October 2010
14:30

King Country	44–5	Buller

Te Kūiti

9 October 2010
14:30

West Coast	33–18	East Coast

Greymouth

==== Week 8 ====
16 October 2010
14:30

Wairarapa Bush	22–43	King Country

Masterton

16 October 2010
14:30

East Coast	25–28	Horowhenua-Kapiti

Ruatoria

16 October 2010
14:30

Buller	20–11	West Coast

Westport

== Finals ==
=== Lochore Cup ===
The 2010 Lochore Cup semi-finals began with controversy when West Coast Rugby Football Union were effectively expelled from the competition:

"West Coast, with three wins and two bonus points, had gained sufficient championship points to qualify for the Lochore Cup semi-finals but the team’s endeavors were ruined when the NZRU fined West Coast $2500 and stripped it of live competition points for knowingly breaching the eligibility regulations during the game against Wairarapa Bush which the Coast had won and gained a bonus point for scoring four tries." – West Coast Rugby Football Union

Wairarapa Bush and Buller progressed to the final by beating King Country and Horowhenua-Kapiti respectively.

The Lochore Cup was won by Wairarapa Bush beating Buller 15-9 in the final.

=== Meads Cup ===
The Meads Cup semi-finals were won by North Otago and Whanganui, defeating Mid-Canterbury and Poverty Bay respectively.

In the final of the Meads Cup, North Otago won the game 39–18 over Whanganui in the match on 30 October at Whitestone Contracting Stadium.

== See also ==
- Hanan Shield competed for by Mid Canterbury, North Otago and South Canterbury
- Rundle Cup played between Buller and West Coast
- New Zealand Heartland XV
- Ranfurly Shield 2010–2019
- 2010 ITM Cup
