= Broadfoot =

Broadfoot is an English surname. Notable people with this surname include:

- Barry Broadfoot (1926–2003), Canadian journalist
- Chris Broadfoot (born 1981), Australian footballer
- Darryl Broadfoot, Scottish football writer
- Dave Broadfoot (1925–2016), Canadian comedian
- David Broadfoot (1899–1953), Scottish seaman
- George Broadfoot (1807–1845), English soldier
- Grover L. Broadfoot (1892–1962), American judge
- Joe Broadfoot (born 1940), English footballer
- Kirk Broadfoot (born 1984), Scottish football player
- Louise Broadfoot (born 1978), Australian cricket player
- Patricia Broadfoot (born 1949), English academic
- Ross Broadfoot (born 1985), English rugby player
- Walter Broadfoot (1881–1965), New Zealand politician
