= Aerokurier =

German aviation perodical

- Categories: Aviation
- Frequency: Monthly
- Publisher: Motor Presse Stuttgart
- Founded: 1957
- Language: German
- Website: www.aerokurier.de

Aerokurier is a monthly magazine founded in 1957 covering international civil aviation published in the German language by Motor Presse Stuttgart, a large European publisher of special interest magazines. The magazine concentrates on the following subjects:

- General aviation
- Business aviation
- Air sports
- Gliding
- Ultralight aviation
- Flight training
- Developments in aviation technology
- Airports
- Political topics concerning aviation

Aerokurier is the principal sponsor of the Online Contest (OLC), a worldwide decentralized soaring competition for glider, hang glider, and paraglider pilots.
