= OLC =

OLC is a three-letter initialism (TLA) that may refer to:

- Oak leaf cluster, a military decoration
- Office of Legal Counsel in the U.S. Department of Justice
- Ohio Library Council, professional association for librarians in Ohio
- Online Contest (gliding), a glider, hang glider, and paraglider soaring competition
- Online creation, a software feature in MUDs that allows editing the world while interacting with it
- Online Learning Consortium, a professional organization promoting online education
- Open Location Code, a system for identifying a place on Earth
- Open-loop controller, a system controller that does not use feedback
- Optical lattice clock, a type of optical clock
- The Oriental Land Company

== See also ==
- OLCS (Our Lady's Convent School), Loughborough, Leicestershire, England, UK
- Olcs (village), Vața de Jos Commune, Hunedoara County, Transylvania Region, Romania
