= Gliding =

Recreational activity and competitive air sport

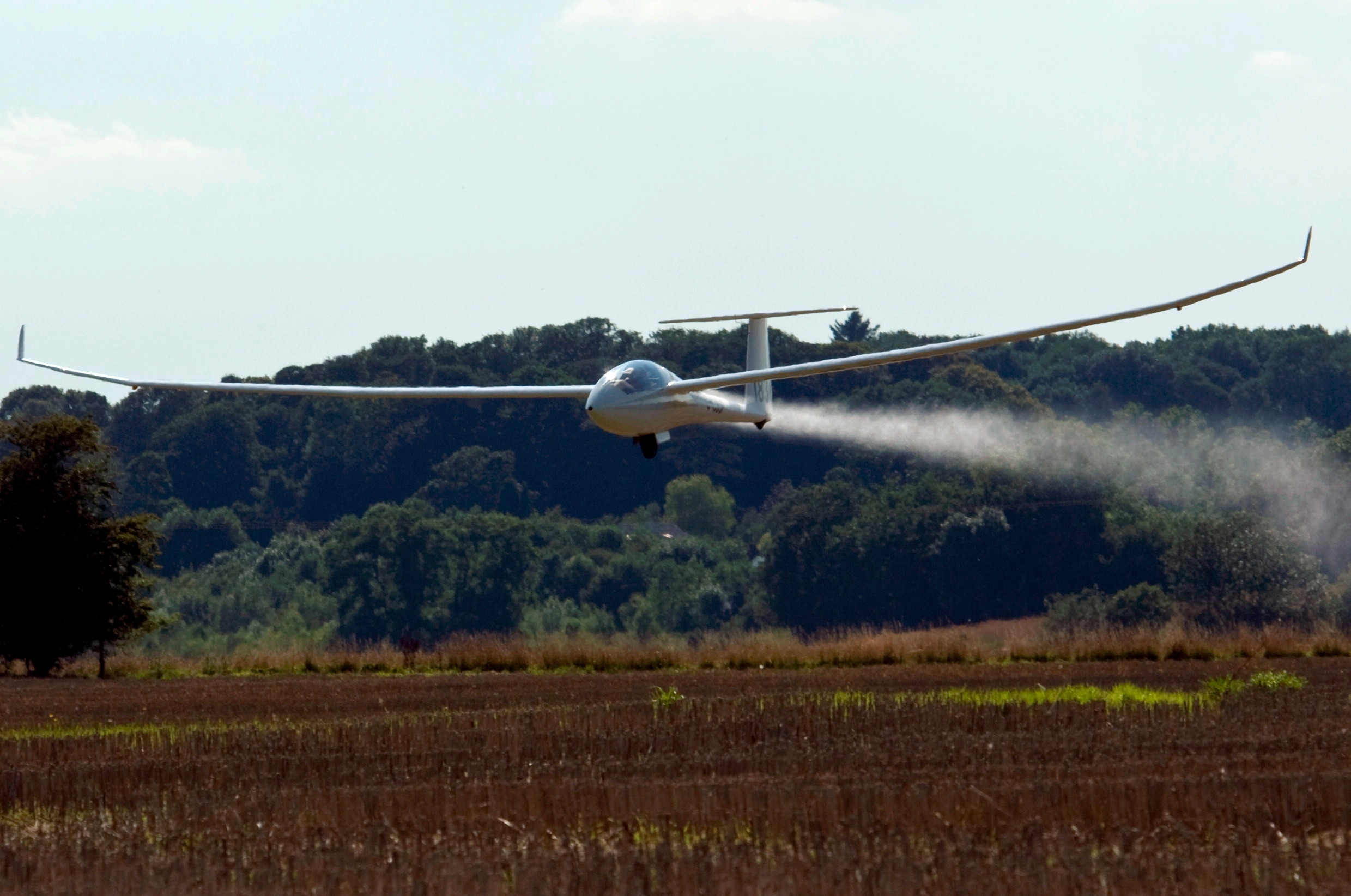
- A Ventus-2 glider landing while jettisoning water that has been carried as ballast
- Highest governing body: Fédération Aéronautique Internationale

Characteristics
- Mixed-sex: Yes
- Type: Air sports

Presence
- Country or region: Worldwide
- Olympic: No
- World Games: 2017 (aerobatics)

Gliding is a recreational activity and competitive air sport in which pilots fly unpowered aircraft known as gliders or sailplanes using naturally occurring currents of rising air in the atmosphere to remain airborne. The word soaring is also used for the sport.

Gliding as a sport began in the 1920s. Initially the objective was to increase the duration of flights but soon pilots attempted cross-country flights away from the place of launch. Improvements in aerodynamics and in the understanding of weather phenomena have allowed greater distances at higher average speeds. Long distances are now flown using any of the main sources of rising air: ridge lift, thermals and lee waves. When conditions are favourable, experienced pilots can now fly hundreds of kilometres before returning to their home airfields; occasionally flights of more than 1,000 kilometres (621 mi) are achieved.

Some competitive pilots fly in races around pre-defined courses. These gliding competitions test pilots' abilities to make best use of local weather conditions as well as their flying skills. Local and national competitions are organized in many countries, and there are biennial World Gliding Championships. Techniques to maximize a glider's speed around the day's task in a competition have been developed, including the optimum speed to fly, navigation using GPS and the carrying of water ballast. If the weather deteriorates pilots are sometimes unable to complete a cross-country flight. Consequently, they may need to land elsewhere, perhaps in a field, but motorglider pilots can avoid this by starting an engine.

Powered-aircraft and winches are the two most common means of launching gliders. These and other launch methods require assistance and facilities such as airfields, tugs, and winches. These are usually provided by gliding clubs who also train new pilots and maintain high safety standards. Although in most countries the standards of safety of the pilots and the aircraft are the responsibility of governmental bodies, the clubs and sometimes national gliding associations often have delegated authority.

== History ==
The development of heavier-than-air flight in the half century between Sir George Cayley's coachman in 1853 and the Wright brothers in 1903 mainly involved gliders (see History of aviation). However, the sport of gliding only emerged after the First World War, as a result of the Treaty of Versailles, which imposed severe restrictions on the manufacture and use of single-seat powered aircraft in Germany's Weimar Republic. Thus, in the 1920s and 1930s, while aviators and aircraft makers in the rest of the world were working to improve the performance of powered aircraft, the Germans were designing, developing and flying ever more efficient gliders and discovering ways of using the natural forces in the atmosphere to make them fly farther and faster. With the active support of the German government, there were 50,000 glider pilots by 1937. The first German gliding competition was held at the Wasserkuppe in 1920, organized by Oskar Ursinus. The best flight lasted two minutes and set a world distance record of 2 kilometres (1.2 mi). Within ten years, it had become an international event in which the achieved durations and distances had increased greatly. In 1931, Gunther Grönhoff flew 272 kilometres (169 mi) on the front of a storm from Munich to Kadaň (Kaaden in German) in Western Czechoslovakia, farther than had been thought possible.

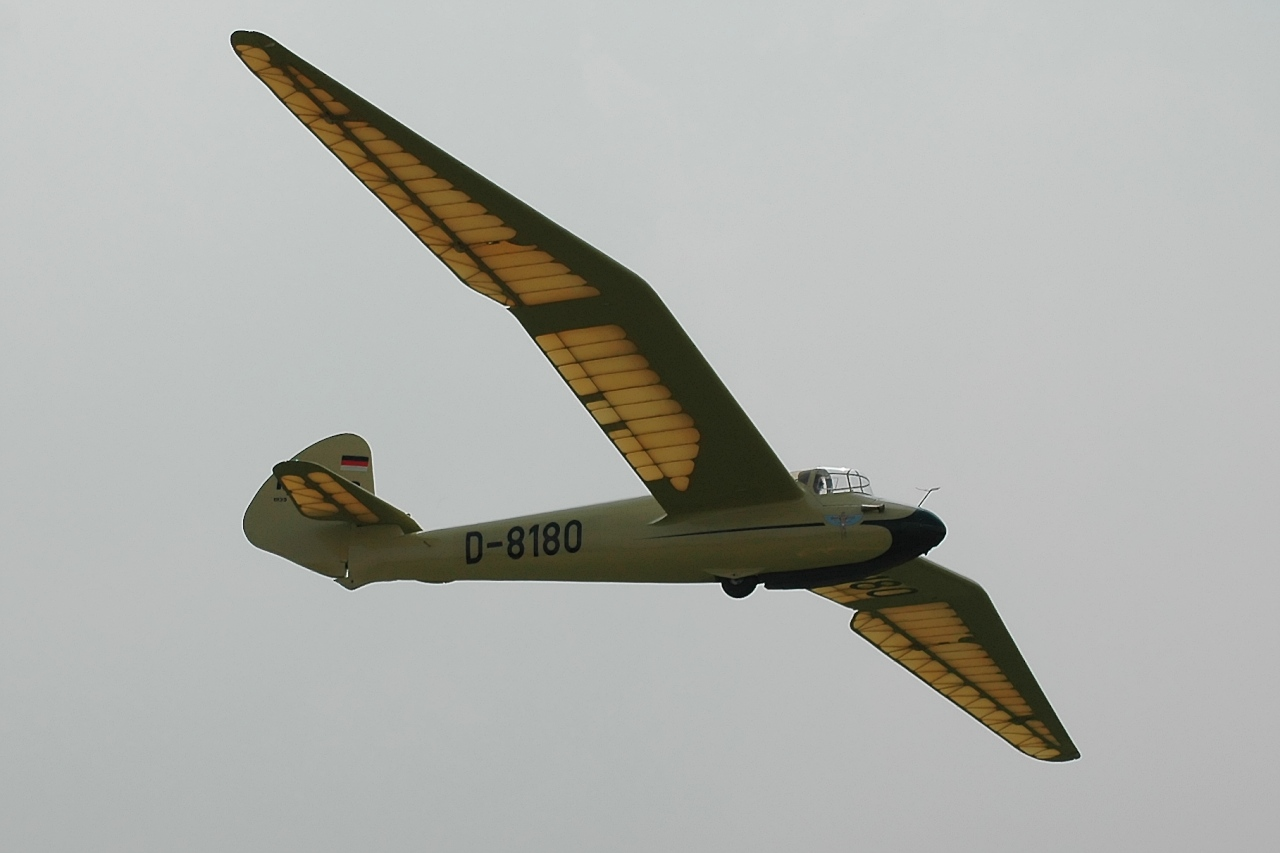
The "gull wing" Göppingen Gö 3 Minimoa produced in Germany from 1936

In the 1930s, gliding spread to many other countries. In the 1936 Summer Olympics in Berlin gliding was a demonstration sport, and it was scheduled to be a full Olympic sport in the 1940 Games. A glider, the Olympia, was developed in Germany for the event, but World War II intervened. By 1939 the major gliding records were held by Russians, including a distance record of 748 kilometres (465 mi). During the war, the sport of gliding in Europe was largely suspended, though several German fighter aces in the conflict, including Erich Hartmann, began their flight training in gliders.

Gliding did not return to the Olympics after the war for two reasons: a shortage of gliders, and the failure to agree on a single model of competition glider. (Some in the community feared doing so would hinder development of new designs.) The re-introduction of air sports such as gliding to the Olympics has occasionally been proposed by the world governing body, the Fédération Aéronautique Internationale (FAI), but has been rejected on the grounds of lack of public interest.

In many countries during the 1950s, a large number of trained pilots wanted to continue flying. Many were also aeronautical engineers who could design, build and maintain gliders. They started both clubs and manufacturers, many of which still exist. This stimulated the development of both gliding and gliders, for example the membership of the Soaring Society of America increased from 1,000 to 16,000 by 1980. The increased numbers of pilots, greater knowledge and improving technology helped set new records, for example the pre-war altitude record was doubled by 1950, and the first 1,000-kilometre (620 mi) flight was achieved in 1964. New materials such as glass fiber and carbon fiber, advances in wing shapes and airfoils, electronic instruments, the Global Positioning System and improved weather forecasting have since allowed many pilots to make flights that were once extraordinary. Today over 550 pilots have made flights over 1,000 kilometres (620 mi). Although there is no Olympic competition, there are the World Gliding Championships. The first event was held at the Samedan Airport in 1948. Since World War II it has been held every two years. There are now six classes open to both sexes, plus three classes for women and two junior classes. The latest worldwide statistics for 2011 indicate that Germany, the sport's birthplace, is still a center of the gliding world: it accounted for 27 percent of the world's glider pilots, and the three major glider manufacturers are still based there. However the meteorological conditions that allow soaring are common and the sport has been taken up in many countries. At the last count, there were over 111,000 active civilian glider pilots and 32,920 gliders, plus an unknown number of military cadets and aircraft. Clubs actively seek new members by giving trial flights, which are also a useful source of revenue for the clubs.

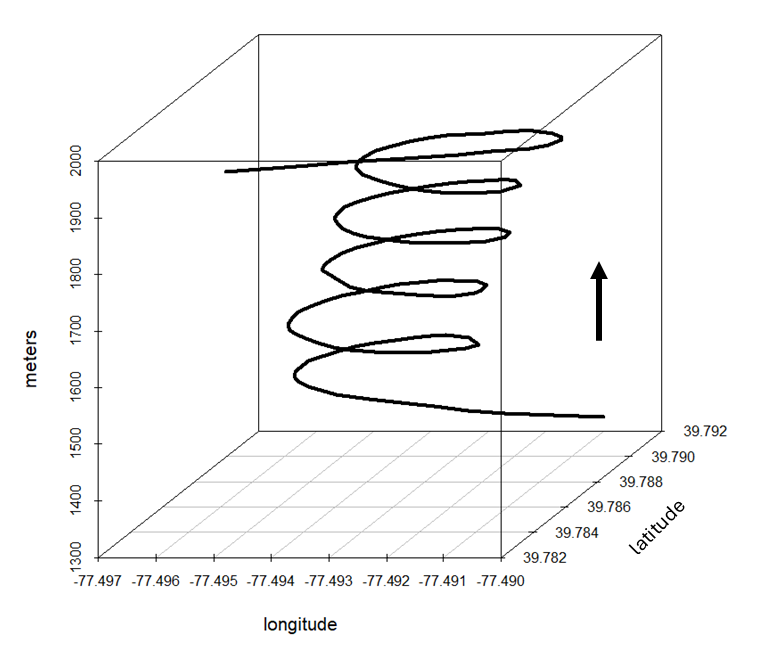
3D plot of 3 minutes from a flight of a glider flying 5 loops to ride a vertical thermal. Rate of climb was 3 meters/second. No vertical exaggeration.

== Soaring ==
Glider pilots can stay airborne for hours by flying through air that is ascending as fast or faster than the glider itself is descending, thus gaining potential energy. The most commonly used sources of rising air are

- thermals (updrafts of warm air);
- ridge lift (found where the wind blows against the face of a hill and is forced to rise); and
- wave lift (standing waves in the atmosphere, analogous to the ripples on the surface of a stream).

Ridge lift rarely allows pilots to climb much higher than about 600 metres (2,000 ft) above the terrain; thermals, depending on the climate and terrain, can allow climbs in excess of 3,000 metres (9,800 ft) in flat country and much higher above mountains; wave lift has allowed a glider to reach an altitude of 23,202 metres (76,122 ft). In a few countries such as the UK, gliders may continue to climb into the clouds in uncontrolled airspace, but in many European countries the pilot must stop climbing before reaching the cloud base (see Visual Flight Rules).

=== Thermals ===
Circling in thermal lift during a competition

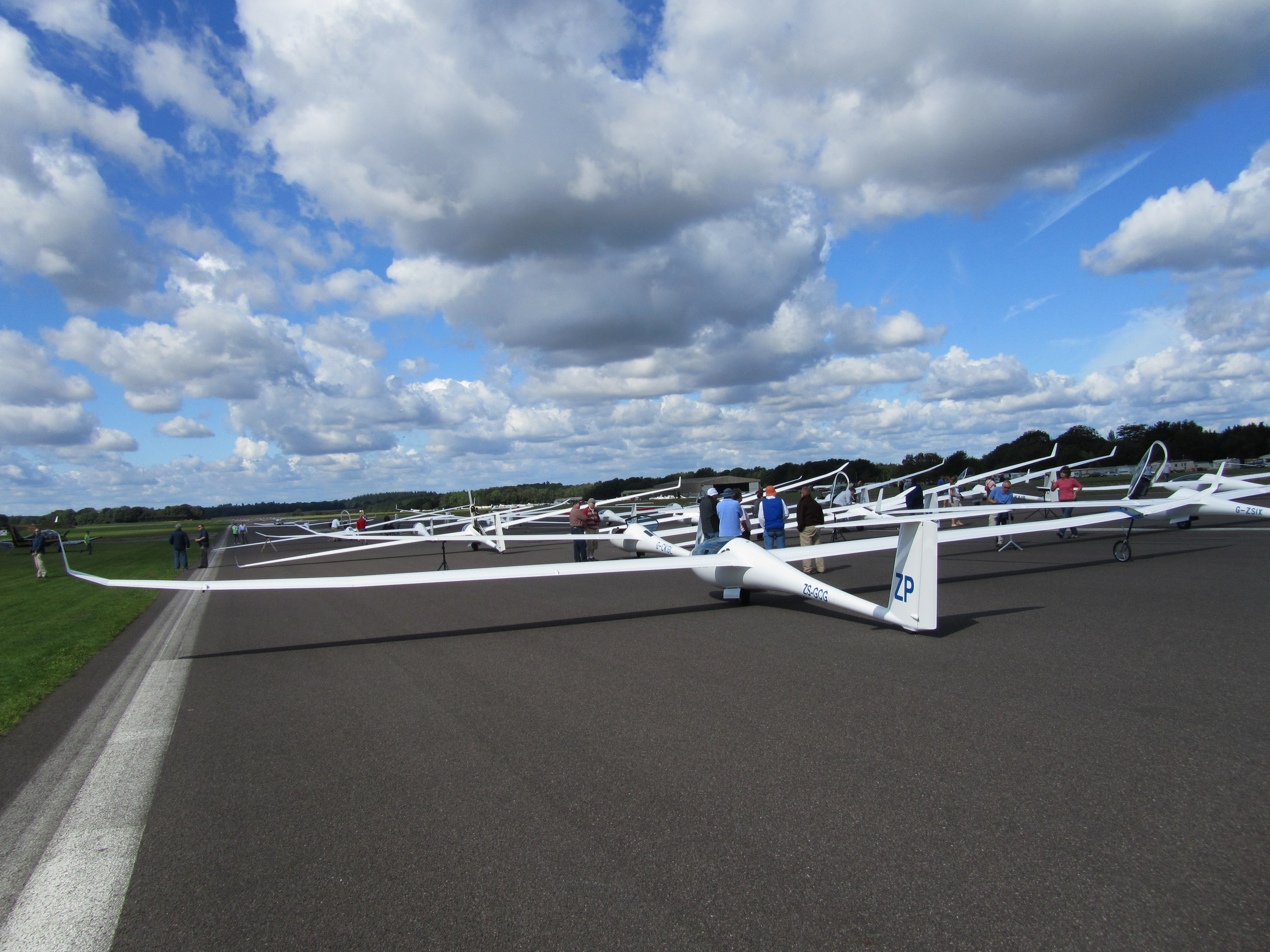
Good gliding weather: Competitors studying cumulus humilis, which suggest active thermals and light winds.

Thermals begin as bubbles of rising air that are formed on the ground through the warming of the surface by sunlight. If the air contains enough moisture, the water will condense from the rising air and form cumulus clouds. When the air has little moisture or when an inversion stops the warm air from rising high enough for the moisture to condense, thermals do not create cumulus clouds. Without clouds or dust devils to mark the thermals, thermals are not always associated with any feature on the ground. The pilot must then use both skill and luck to find them using a sensitive vertical speed indicator called a variometer that quickly indicates climbs and descents. Occasionally reliable thermals can be found in the exhaust gases from power stations or from fires.

Once a thermal is encountered, the pilot can fly in tight circles to keep the glider within the thermal, thus gaining altitude before flying toward the destination or to the next thermal. This is known as "thermalling". Alternatively, glider pilots on cross-country flights may choose to 'dolphin'. This is when the pilot merely slows down in rising air, and then speeds up again in the non-rising air, thus following an undulating flight path. Dolphining allows the pilot to minimize the loss of height over great distances without spending time turning. Climb rates depend on conditions, but rates of several meters per second are common and can be maximized by gliders equipped with flaps. Thermals can also be formed in a line usually because of the wind or the terrain, creating cloud streets. These can allow the pilot to fly straight while climbing in continuous lift.

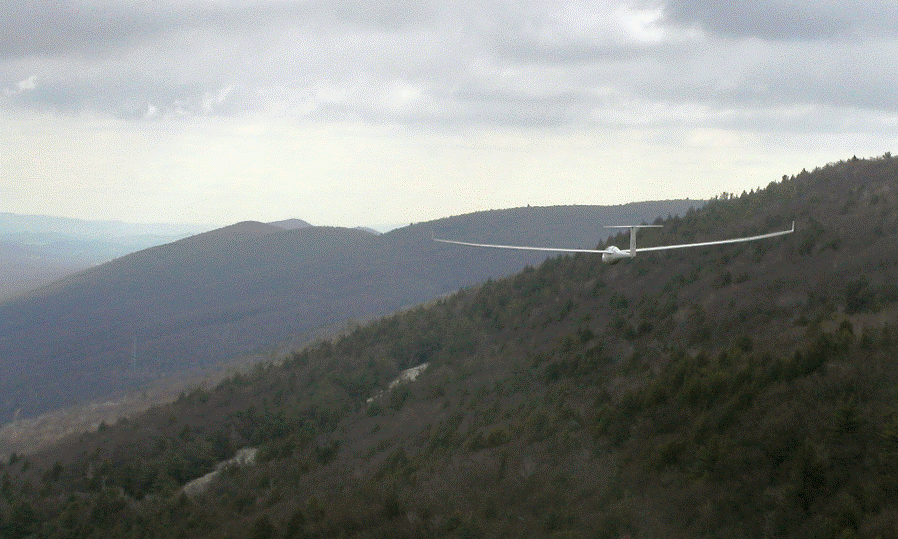
A Scimitar glider ridge soaring in Lock Haven, Pennsylvania US

As it requires rising heated air, thermalling is most effective in mid-latitudes from spring through late summer. During winter, the sun's heat can only create weak thermals, but ridge and wave lift can still be used during this period.

=== Ridge lift ===
Using mountain ridges to gain altitude

A ridge soaring pilot uses upward air movements caused when the wind blows on to the sides of hills. It can also be augmented by thermals when the slopes also face the sun. In places where a steady wind blows, a ridge may allow virtually unlimited time aloft, although records for duration are no longer recognized because of the danger of exhaustion.

=== Wave lift ===
A lenticular cloud produced by a mountain wave

The powerfully rising and sinking air in mountain waves was discovered by glider pilot, Wolf Hirth, in 1933. Gliders can sometimes climb in these waves to great altitudes, although pilots must use supplementary oxygen to avoid hypoxia.

This lift is often marked by long, stationary lenticular (lens-shaped) clouds lying perpendicular to the wind. Wave lift was used to set the current altitude record (to be ratified) of 23,202 metres (76,122 ft) on 2 September 2018 over El Calafate, Argentina. The pilots, Jim Payne and Tim Gardner, wore pressure suits. The current world distance record of 3,008 kilometres (1,869 mi) by Klaus Ohlmann (set on 21 January 2003) was also flown using mountain waves in South America.

A rare wave phenomenon is known as Morning Glory, a roll cloud producing strong lift. Pilots near Australia's Gulf of Carpentaria make use of it in springtime.

Schematic cross section through a sea breeze front. If the air inland is moist, cumulus often marks the front.

=== Other sources of lift ===
The boundaries where two air masses meet are known as convergence zones. These can occur in sea breezes or in desert regions. In a sea-breeze front, cold air from the sea meets the warmer air from the land and creates a boundary between two masses of air like a shallow cold front. Glider pilots can gain altitude by flying along the intersection as if it were a ridge of land. Convergence may occur over considerable distances and so may permit virtually straight flight while climbing.

Glider pilots have occasionally been able to use a technique called "dynamic soaring" allowing a glider to gain kinetic energy by repeatedly crossing the boundary between air masses of different horizontal velocity. However, such zones of high "wind gradient" are usually too close to the ground to be used safely by gliders.

== Launch methods ==
Most gliders do not have engines or at least engines that would allow a take-off under their own power. Various methods are therefore used to get airborne. Each method requires specific training, therefore glider pilots must be in current practice for the type of launch being used. Licensing rules in some countries, such as the US, differentiate between aerotows and ground launch methods, due to the widely different techniques.

=== Aerotowing ===
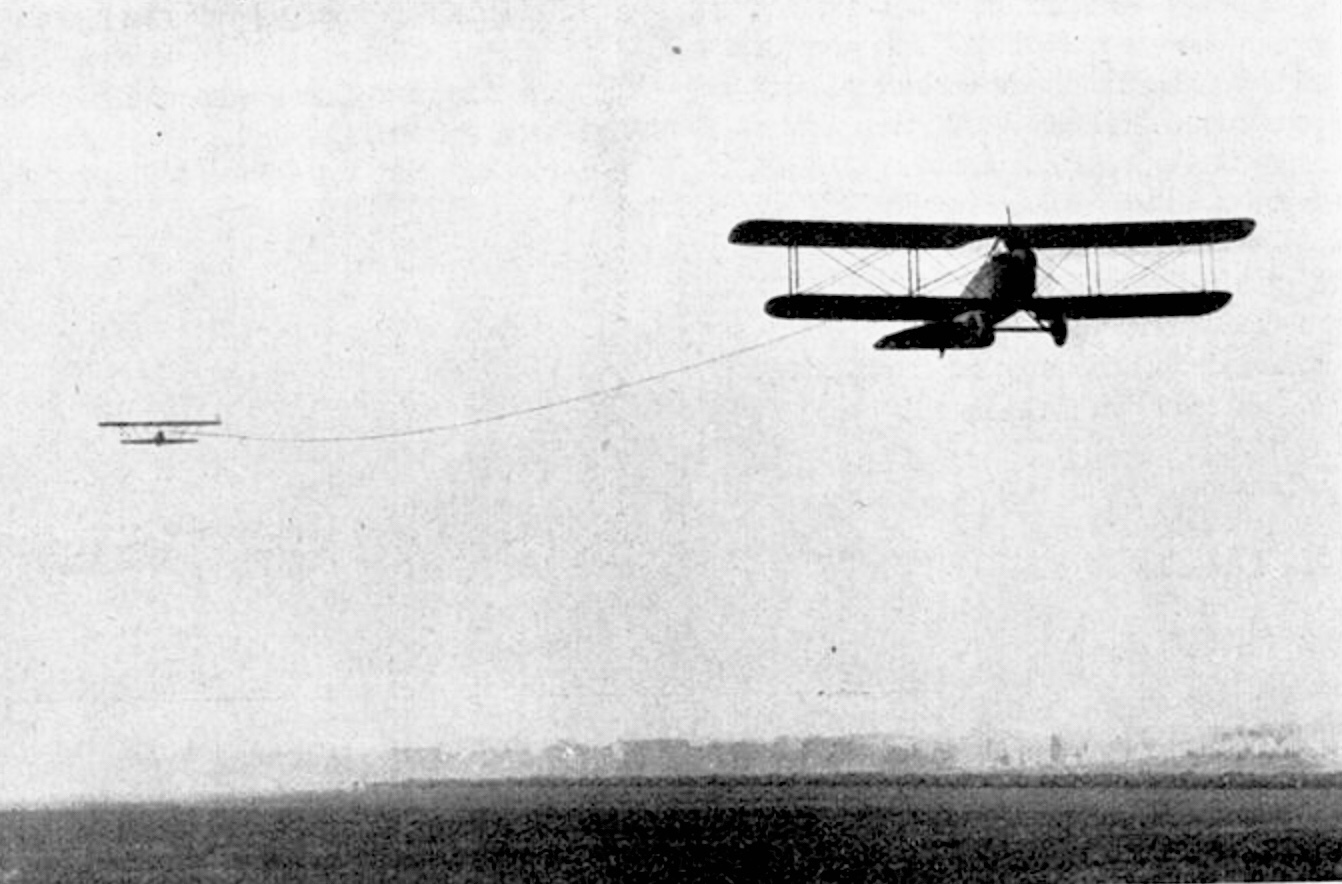
First Aerotowing by Raab-Katzenstein 1927

Aerotow

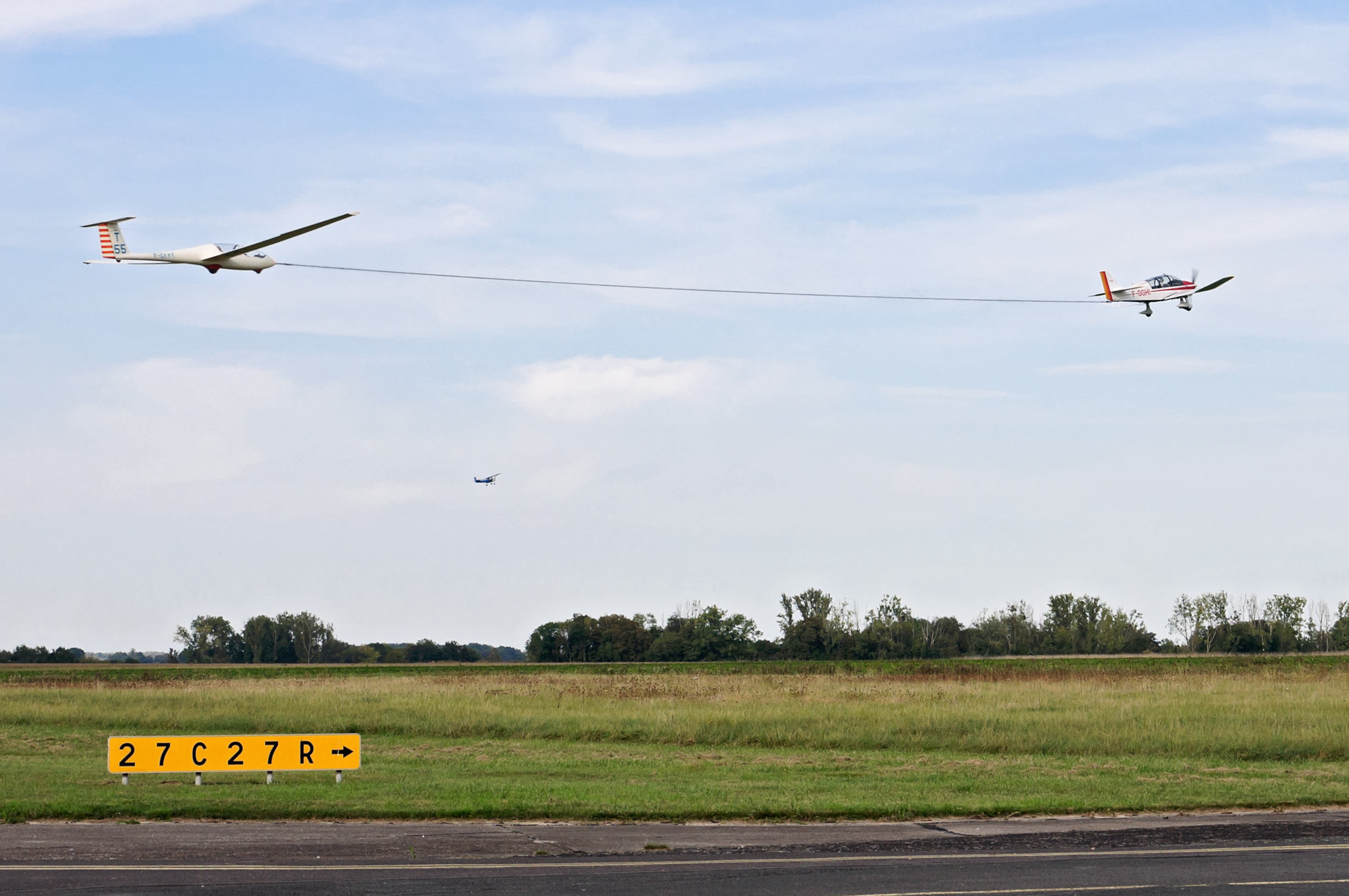
Aerotowing of a Grob G103 Twin Astir II glider by a Robin DR400-180R

In an aerotow a powered aircraft is attached to a glider with a tow rope. Single-engined light aircraft or motor gliders are commonly used. The tow-plane takes the glider to the height and location requested by the pilot where the glider pilot releases the tow-rope. A weak link is often fitted to the rope to ensure that any sudden loads do not damage the airframe of the tow-plane or the glider. Under extreme loads the weak link will fail before any part of the glider or plane fails. There is a remote chance that the weak link might break at low altitude, and so pilots plan for this eventuality before launching.

During the aerotow, the glider pilot keeps the glider behind the tow-plane in either the "low tow" position, just below the wake from the tow-plane, or the "high tow" position just above the wake. In Australia the convention is to fly in low tow, whereas in the United States and Europe the high tow prevails. One rare aerotow variation is attaching two gliders to one tow-plane, using a short rope for the high-towed glider and a long rope for the low tow. The current record is nine gliders in the same aerotow.

=== Winch launching ===
Winch launch

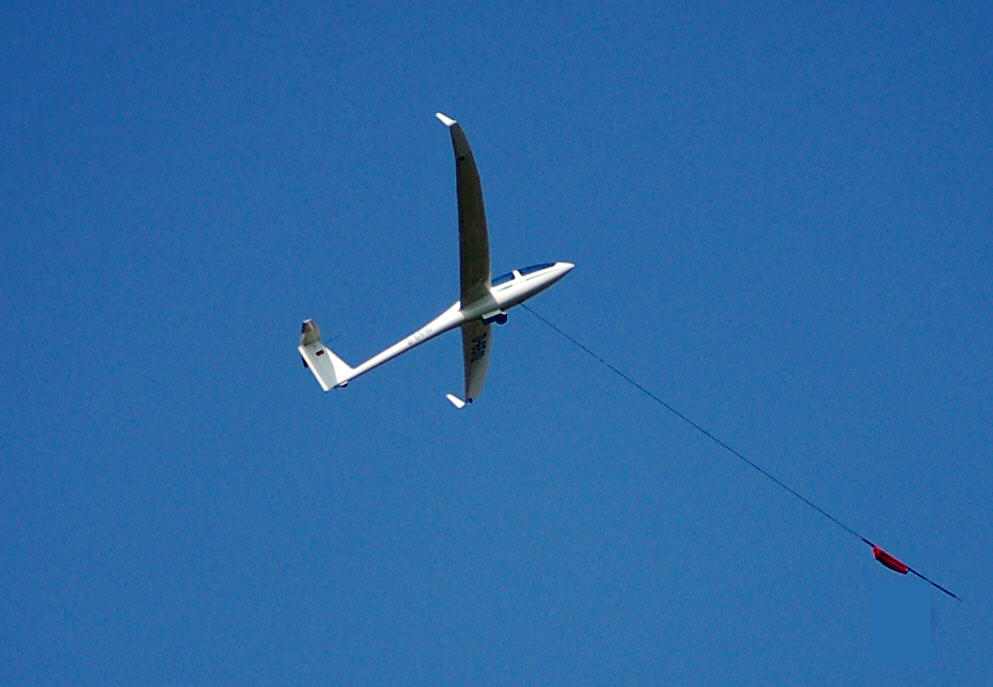
A DG1000 being winch-launched

Gliders are often launched using a stationary ground-based winch mounted on a heavy vehicle. This method is widely used at many European clubs, often in addition to an aerotow service. The engine is usually powered by LPG, petrol or diesel, though hydraulic fluid engines and electrical motors are also used. The winch pulls in a 1,000 to 2,500-metre (3,000 to 7,500 ft) cable, made of high-tensile steel wire or a synthetic fiber, attached to the glider. The cable is released at a height of about 35% of the cable length after a short, steep ride. A strong headwind will result in higher launches.

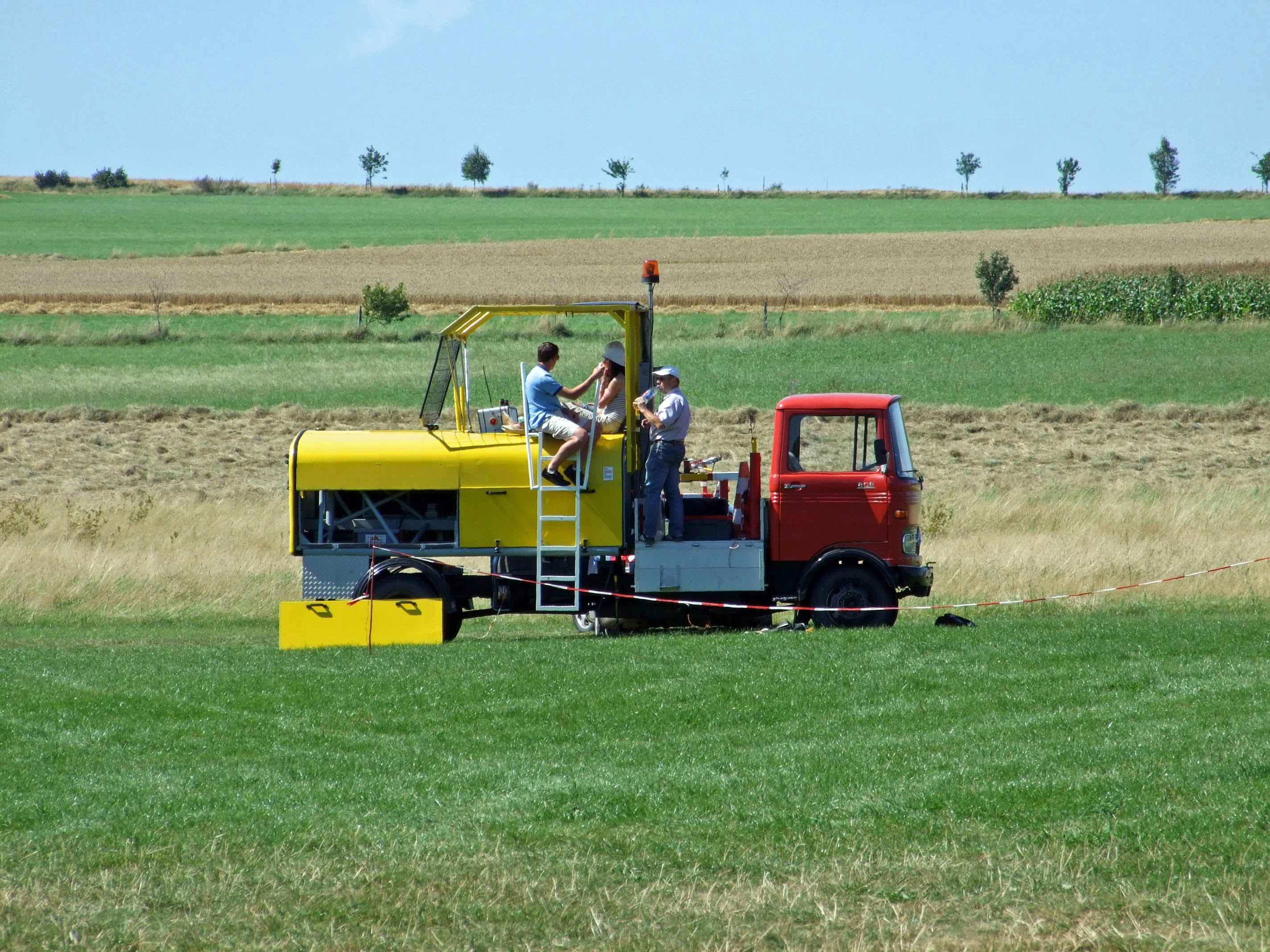
A typical winch

Winch launches are much cheaper than aerotows and permit a higher launch frequency. A winch may also be used at sites where an aerotow could not operate, because of the shape of the field or because of noise restrictions. The height gained from a winch is usually less than that from an aerotow, so pilots need to find a source of lift soon after releasing from the cable, or else the flight will be short. A break in the cable or the weak link (Note: A weak link is a specially calibrated element, connecting two parts of the winch cable, designed to break if the tension on the winch cable exceeds safe values.) during a winch launch is a possibility for which pilots are trained.

=== Auto-tow ===
Another method of launching, the "autotow", is rarer nowadays. The direct autotow requires a hard surface and a powerful vehicle that is attached to the glider by a long steel cable. After gently taking up slack in the cable, the driver accelerates hard and as a result the glider rises rapidly to about 400 metres (1,300 ft), especially if there is a good headwind and a runway of 1.5 kilometres (0.93 mi) or more. This method has also been used on desert dry lakes.

A variation on the direct autotow is known as the "reverse pulley" method. In this method, the truck drives towards the glider being launched. The cable passes around a pulley at the far end of the airfield, resulting in an effect similar to that of a winch launch.

=== Bungee launch ===
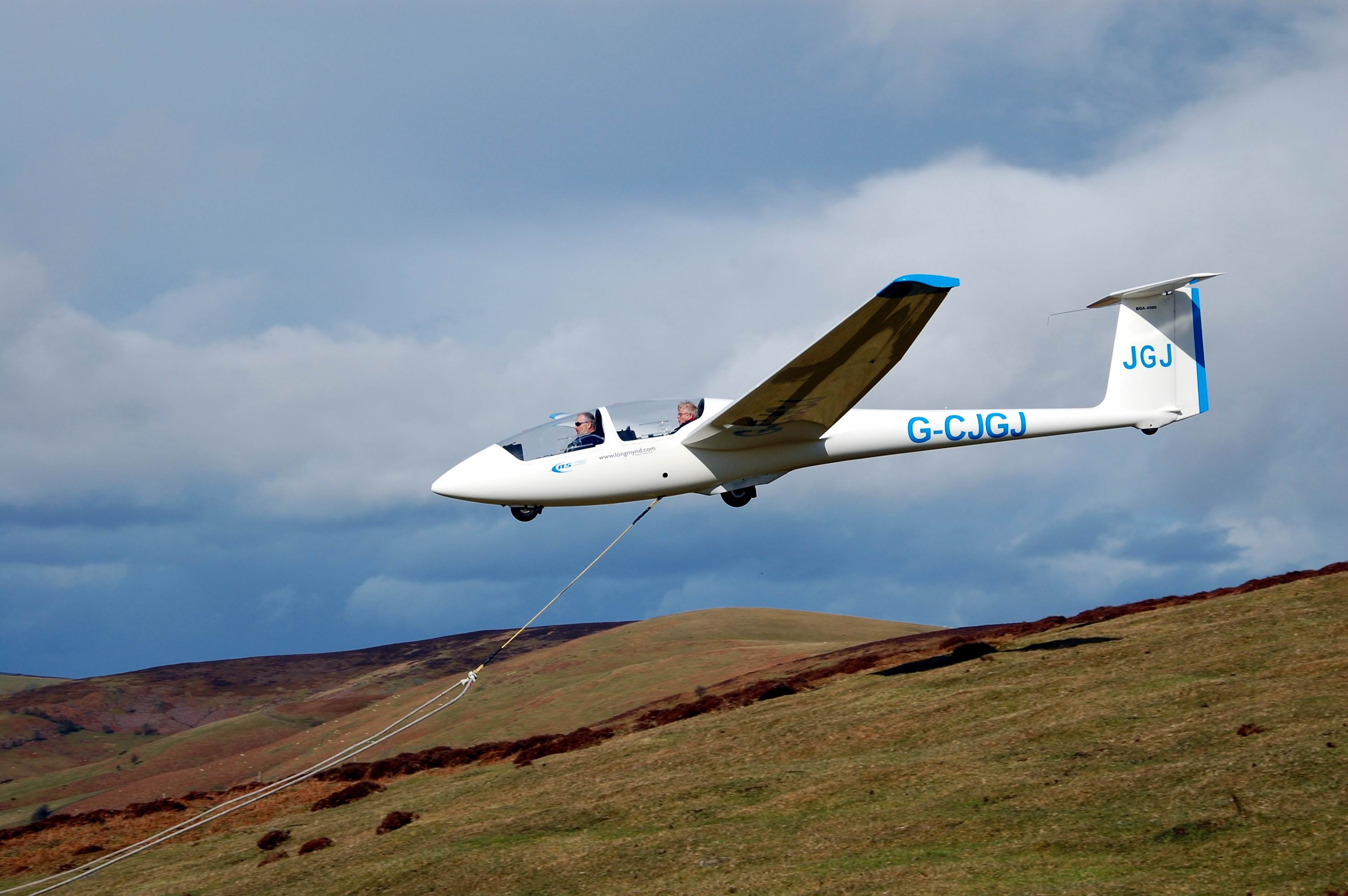
A bungee launch at the Long Mynd by the Midland Gliding Club

Bungee launching was widely used in the early days of gliding, and occasionally gliders are still launched from the top of a gently sloping hill into a strong breeze using a substantial multi-stranded rubber band, or "bungee". For this launch method, the glider's main wheel rests in a small concrete trough. The hook normally used for winch-launching is instead attached to the middle of the bungee. Each end is then pulled by three or four people. One group runs slightly to the left, the other to the right. Once the tension in the bungee is high enough, the glider is released and the glider's wheel pops out of the trough. The glider gains just enough energy to leave the ground and fly away from the hill.

=== Gravity launch ===
A glider can simply be pushed down a slope until gravity can create enough speed for it to take off.

== Cross-country ==
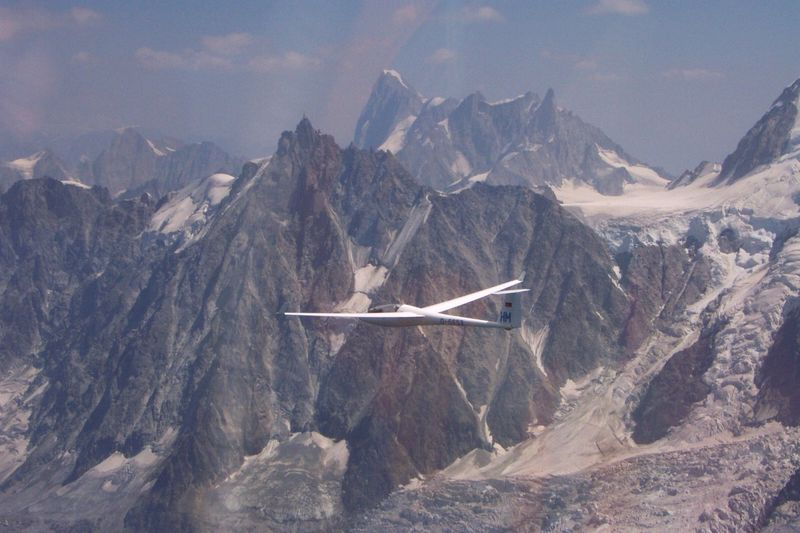
Glider on a cross-country flight in the Alps

One of the measures of a glider's performance is the distance that it can fly for each meter it descends, known as its glide ratio. Glide ratio is dependent on an aircraft's class, and can typically range from 44:1 (for modern designs in the Standard Class) up to 70:1 (for the largest aircraft). A good gliding performance combined with regular sources of rising air enables modern gliders to fly long distances at high speeds. The weather is a major factor in determining cross-country speeds. The record average speed for 1,000 kilometres (620 mi) is 203.1 kilometres per hour (126.2 mph) and required unusually good conditions, but even in places with less favorable conditions (such as Northern Europe) a skilled pilot can expect to complete flights over 500 kilometres (310 mi) every year.

As the performance of gliders improved in the 1960s, the concept of flying as far away as possible became unpopular with the crews who had to retrieve the gliders. Pilots now usually plan to fly around a course (called a task) via turn-points, returning to the starting point.

In addition to just trying to fly further, glider pilots also race each other in competitions. The winner is the fastest, or, if the weather conditions are poor, the furthest round the course. Tasks of up to 1,000 km have been set and average speeds of 120 km/h are not unusual.

Initially, ground observers confirmed that pilots had rounded the turn-points. Later, the glider pilots photographed these places and submitted the film for verification. Today, gliders carry secure GNSS Flight Recorders that record the position every few seconds from GPS satellites. These recording devices now provide the proof that the turn-points have been reached.

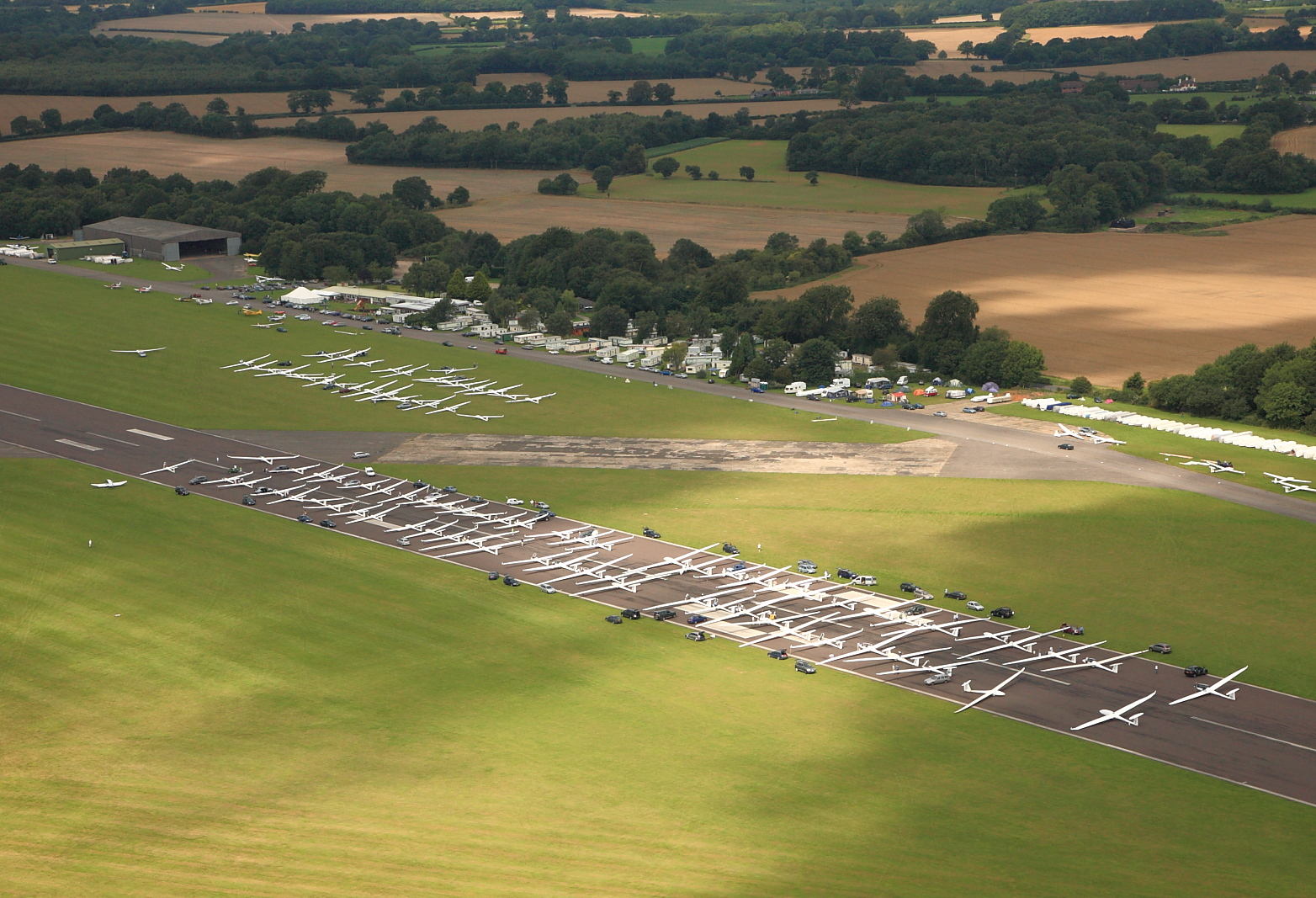
Competition grid at Lasham Airfield in 2009

National competitions generally last one week, with international championships running over two. The winner is the pilot who has amassed the greatest number of points over all the contest days. However, these competitions have as yet failed to draw much interest outside the gliding community for several reasons. Because it would be unsafe for many gliders to cross a start line at the same time, pilots can choose their own start time. Furthermore, gliders are not visible to the spectators for long periods during each day's contest and the scoring is complex, so traditional gliding competitions are difficult to televise. In an attempt to widen the sport's appeal, a new format, the Grand Prix, has been introduced. Innovations introduced in the Grand Prix format include simultaneous starts for a small number of gliders, cockpit mounted cameras, telemetry giving the positions of the gliders, tasks consisting of multiple circuits, and simplified scoring.

There is a decentralized Internet-based competition called the Online Contest, in which pilots upload their GPS data files and are automatically scored based on distance flown. Worldwide, 6,703 pilots registered for this contest in 2010.

=== Maximizing average speed ===
Soaring pioneer Paul MacCready is usually credited with developing mathematical principles for optimizing the speed at which to fly when cross-country soaring, although it was first described by Wolfgang Späte in 1938. The speed to fly theory allows the optimal cruising speed between thermals to be computed, using thermal strength, glider performance and other variables. It accounts for the fact that if a pilot flies faster between thermals, the next thermal is reached sooner. However at higher speeds the glider also sinks faster, requiring the pilot to spend more time circling to regain the altitude. The MacCready speed represents the optimal trade-off between cruising and circling. Most competition pilots use MacCready theory to optimize their average speeds, and have the calculations programmed in their flight computers, or use a "McCready ring", a rotatable bezel on the glider's variometer to indicate the best speed to fly. The greatest factor in maximizing average speed, however, remains the ability of the pilot to find the strongest lift.

On cross-country flights on days when strong lift is forecast, pilots fly with water ballast stored in tanks or bags in the wings and fin. The fin tank is used to reduce trim drag by optimizing the center of gravity, which typically would shift forward if water is stored only in the wings ahead of the spar. Ballast enables a sailplane to attain its best lift-to-drag ratio (L/D) at higher speeds but slows its climb rate in thermals, in part because a sailplane with a heavier wing loading cannot circle within a thermal as tightly as one with a lower, unballasted wing loading. But if lift is strong, typically either from thermals or wave, the disadvantage of slower climbs is outweighed by the higher cruising speeds between lift areas. Thus, the pilot can improve the average speed over a course by several percent or achieve longer distances in a given time. If lift is weaker than expected, or if an off-field landing is imminent, the pilot can jettison the water ballast by opening the dump valves.

On days with particularly strong and widespread lift pilots can attain high average speeds by alternating periods of fast flight with pull-ups, merely slowing down in areas of lift without deviating from the course. This 'dolphining' technique can result in high average speeds because the height lost can be minimised until particularly strong lift is encountered when circling would be most effective.

=== Badges ===
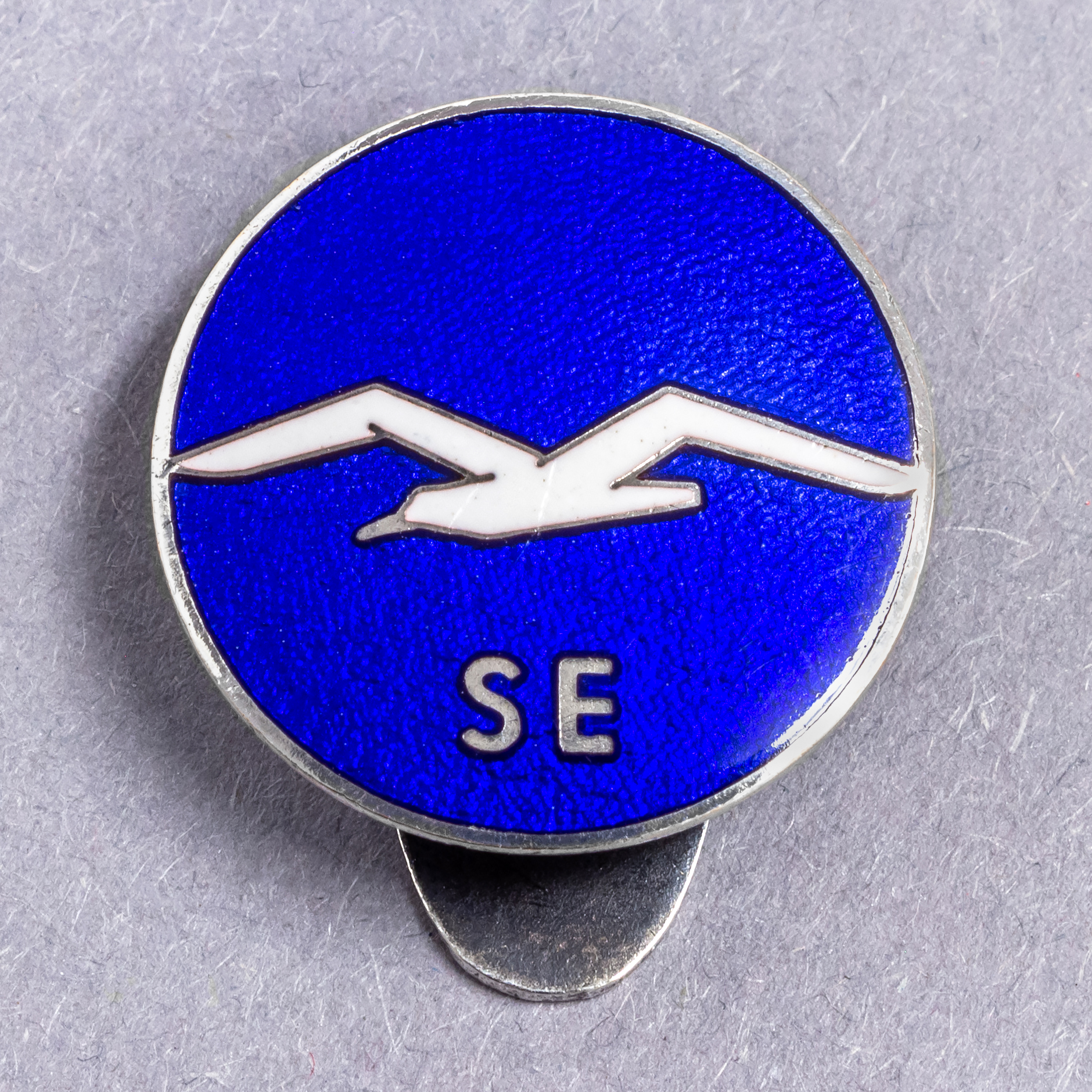
Swedish A-certificate badge

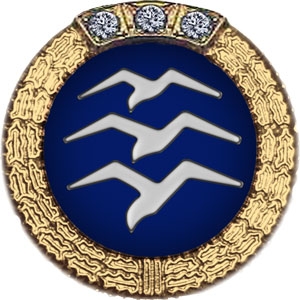
The FAI Diamond Badge

The FAI Silver badge, awarded since 1930 for a 1,000 m height gain, a five-hour flight and a 50 km cross-country flight

Achievements in gliding have been marked by the awarding of badges since the 1920s. For the lower badges, such as the first solo flight, national gliding federations set their own criteria. Typically, a bronze badge shows preparation for cross-country flight, including precise landings and witnessed soaring flights. Higher badges follow the standards set down by the Gliding Commission of the Fédération Aéronautique Internationale (FAI).

The FAI's Sporting Code defines the rules for observers and recording devices to validate the claims for badges that are defined by kilometres of distance and metres of altitude gained. The Silver-C badge was introduced in 1930. Earning the Silver Badge shows that a glider pilot has achieved an altitude gain of at least 1,000 metres (3,281 ft), made a five-hour duration flight, and has flown cross-country for a straight-line distance of at least 50 kilometres (31 mi): these three attainments are usually, but not invariably, achieved in separate flights. A pilot who has earned the Gold badge has achieved an altitude gain of 3,000 metres (9,843 ft), made a flight of five-hours duration, and flown cross-country for a straight-line distance of at least 300 kilometres (186 mi). A pilot who has completed the three parts of the Diamond Badge has flown 300 kilometres (186 mi) to a pre-defined goal, has flown 500 kilometres (311 mi) in one flight (but not necessarily to a pre-defined goal) and gained 5,000 metres (16,000 ft) in height. The FAI also issues a diploma for a flight of 1,000 kilometres (621 mi) and further diplomas for increments of 250 kilometres (155 mi).

=== Landing out ===
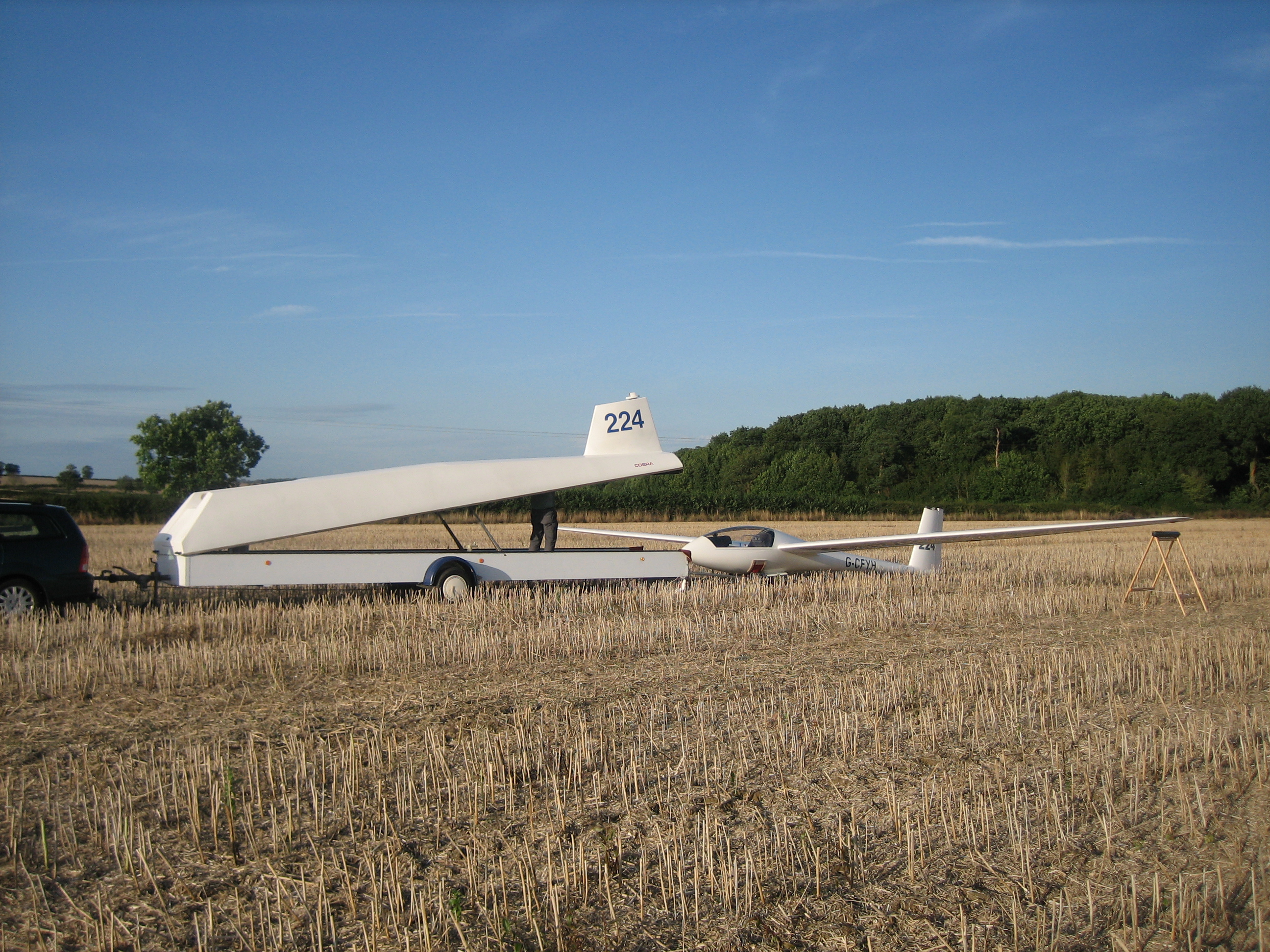
Glider and its trailer after an outlanding

If lift is not found during a cross-country flight, for example because of deteriorating weather, the pilot must choose a location to "land out". Although inconvenient and often mistaken for "emergency landings", landing out (or "outlanding") is a routine event in cross-country gliding. A location needs to be identified where the glider can land safely without damaging the glider, the pilot, or property such as crops or livestock. The glider and the pilot(s) can then be retrieved by road from the outlanding location using a purpose-built trailer. If this is not possible due to an inaccessible location such as a mountain range, the glider may be loaded into its trailer and airlifted by helicopter. In some instances, a tow-plane can be summoned to re-launch the aircraft.

=== Use of engines or motors ===
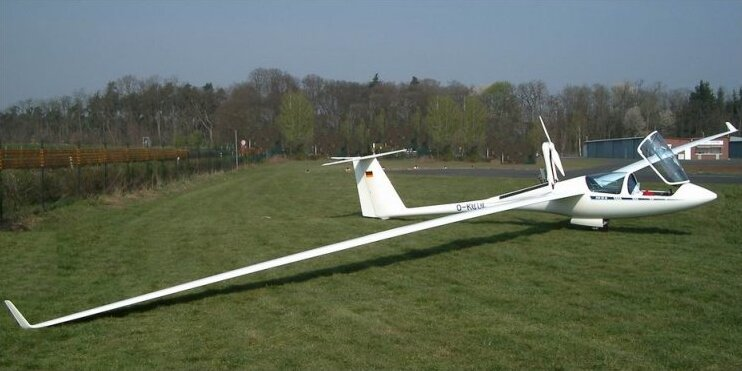
ASH25M—a self-launching two-seater glider

Although adding to the weight and expense, some gliders are fitted with small power units and are known as motor gliders. This avoids the inconvenience of landing out. The power units can be internal combustion engines, electrical motors, or retractable jet engines. Retractable propellers are fitted to high performance sailplanes, though in another category, called touring motor gliders, non-retractable propellers are used. Some powered gliders are "self launching", which makes the glider independent of a tow plane. However some gliders have "sustainer" engines that can prolong flight but are not powerful enough for launching. All power units have to be started at a height that includes a margin that would still allow a safe landing out to be made, if there were a failure to start.

In a competition, using the engine ends the soaring flight. Unpowered gliders are lighter and, as they do not need a safety margin for starting the engine, they can safely thermal at lower altitudes in weaker conditions. Consequently, pilots in unpowered gliders may complete competition flights when some powered competitors cannot. Conversely, motor glider pilots can start the engine if conditions will no longer support soaring flight, while unpowered gliders will have to land out, away from the home airfield, requiring retrieval by road using the glider's trailer.

== Aerobatic competitions ==
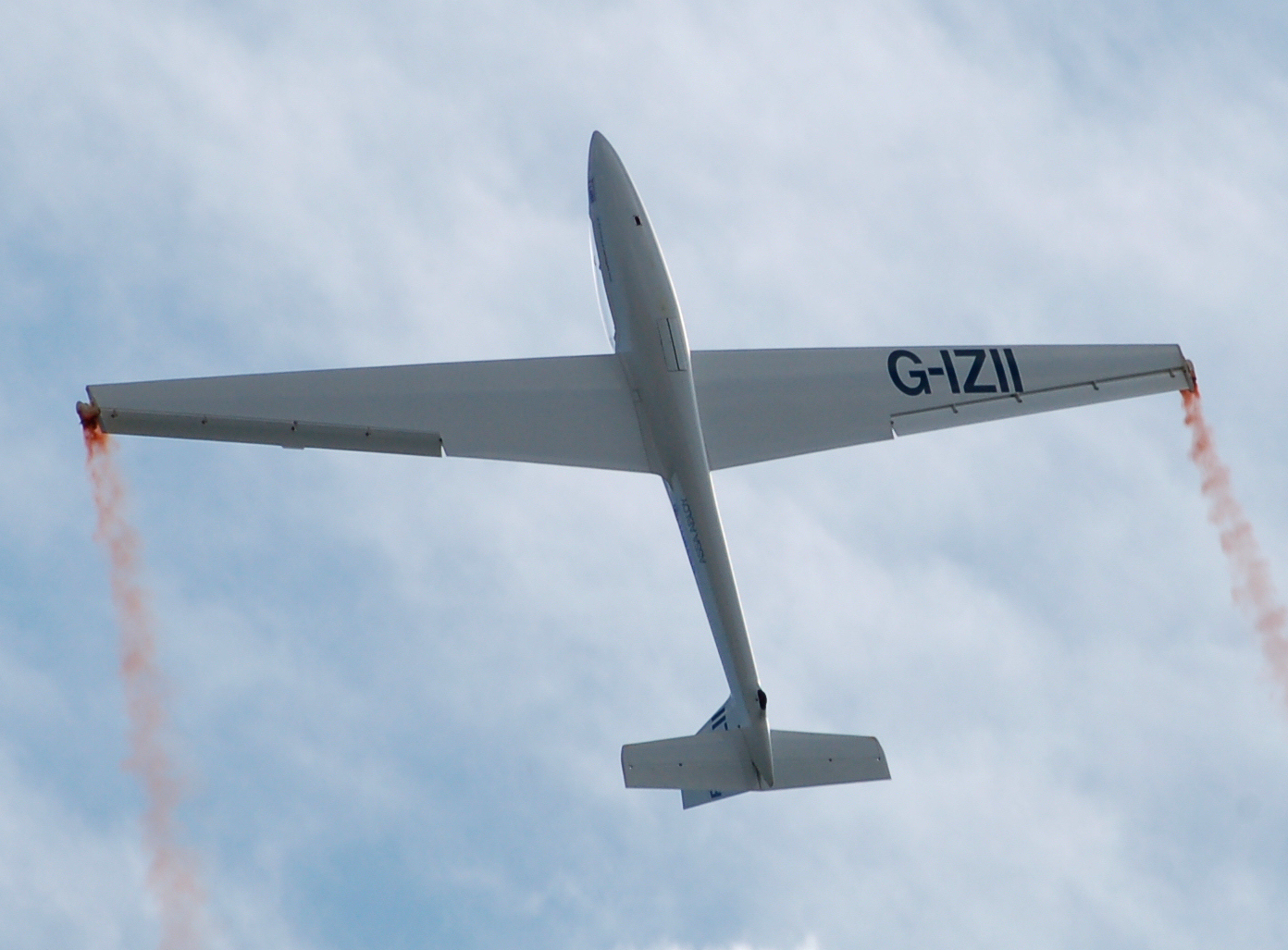
S-1 Swift—modern aerobatic glider

Georgij Kaminski' demonstration flight on the 90th anniversary of the gliding sport of Russia. S-1 Swift glider.

World and European Aerobatic competitions are held regularly. In this type of competition, the pilots fly a program of maneuvers (such as inverted flight, loop, roll, and various combinations). Each maneuver has a rating called the "K-Factor". Maximum points are given for the maneuver if it is flown perfectly; otherwise, points are deducted. Efficient maneuvers also enable the whole program to be completed with the height available. The winner is the pilot with the most points.

== Hazards ==
Unlike hang gliders and paragliders, gliders surround the pilots with strong structures and have undercarriages to absorb impacts when landing. These features prevent injuries from otherwise minor incidents, but there are some hazards. Although training and safe procedures are central to the ethos of the sport, a few fatal accidents occur every year, almost all caused by pilot error. In particular there is a risk of mid-air collisions between gliders, because two pilots might choose to fly to the same area of lift and so might collide. To avoid other gliders and general aviation traffic, pilots must comply with the Rules of the Air and keep a good lookout. They also usually wear parachutes. In several European countries and Australia, the FLARM warning system is used to help avoid mid-air collisions between gliders. A few modern gliders have a ballistic emergency parachute to stabilize the aircraft after a collision.

=== Notable incidents ===
- May 25, 2024, two gliders crashed while landing near Brackley, UK, killing one pilot.
- April 27, 2024 a motor glider crashed in Mount Beauty, Australia killing the pilot and passenger while scattering the ashes of the passenger's father.
- August 17, 2023, two gliders taking part in a gliding competition crashed when their flight paths intersected. The tail of one of the gliders was severed, causing it to crash land and killing its pilot.
- In December 2016, an aviation YouTuber, popular for his thrill seeking exploits, was killed after crashing shortly after taking off in deliberately challenging conditions.
- In 2013, four people and a dog were killed when a glider crashed with a Cessna 150 over a campground near Whistler, Canada. All occupants in the plane and glider were killed in the collision.

== Training and regulation ==
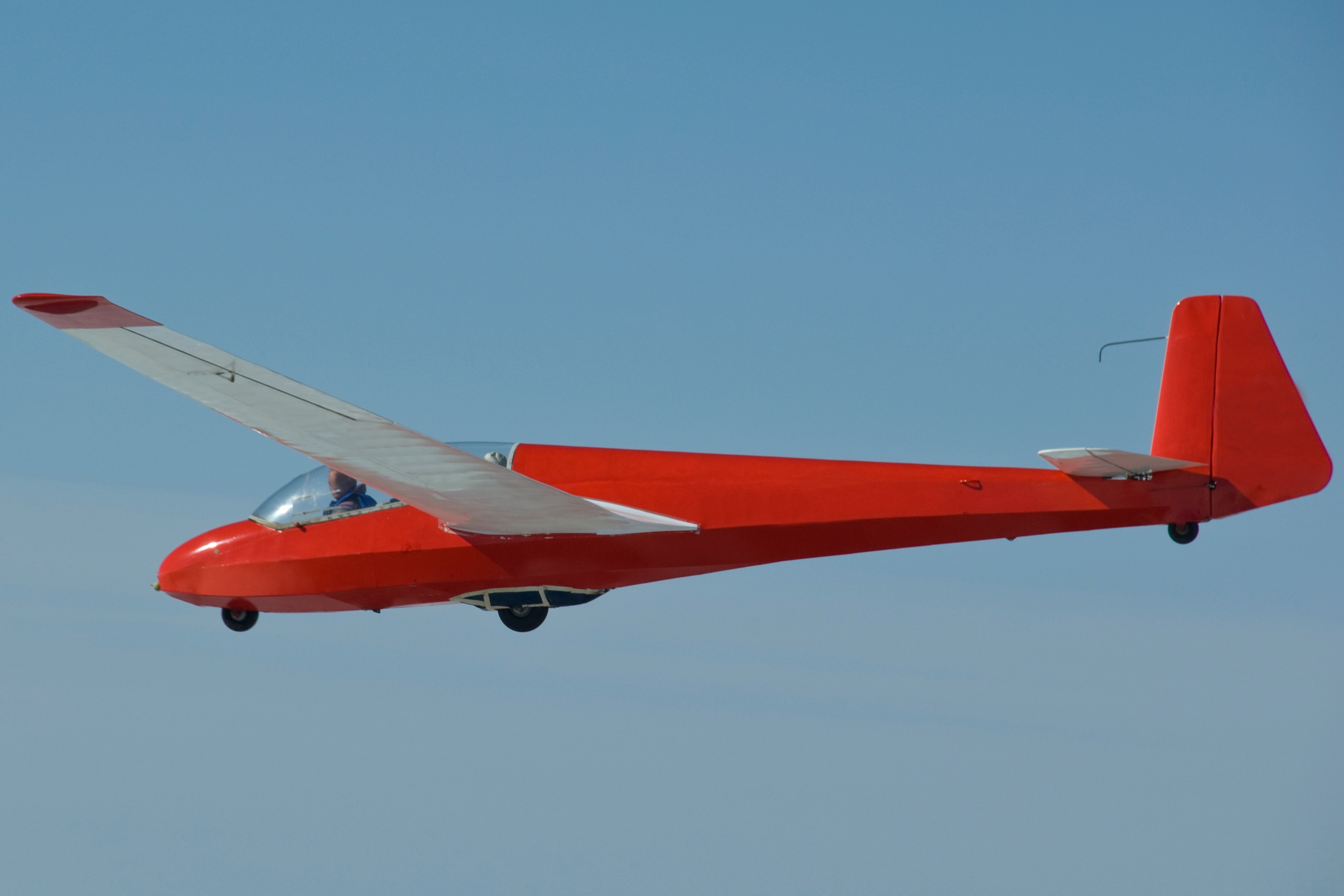
A Schleicher ASK 13, a typical training glider

In addition to national laws controlling aviation, the sport in many countries is regulated through national gliding associations and then through local gliding clubs. Much of the regulation concerns safety and training.

Many clubs provide training for new pilots. The student flies with an instructor in a two-seat glider fitted with dual controls. The instructor performs the first launches and landings, typically from the back seat, but otherwise the student manages the controls until the student is deemed to have the skill and the airmanship necessary to fly solo. Simulators are also beginning to be used in training, especially during poor weather.

After the first solo flights glider pilots are required to stay within gliding range of their home airfield. In addition to solo flying, further flights are made with an instructor until the student is capable of taking a glider cross-country and of handling more difficult weather. Cross-country flights are allowed when they have sufficient experience to find sources of lift away from their home airfield, to navigate, and to select and land in a field if necessary. In most countries pilots must take a written examination on the regulations, navigation, use of the radio, weather, principles of flight and human factors. Proposals are being made to standardise the training requirements across European countries.

In addition to the regulation of pilots, gliders are inspected annually and after exceeding predetermined flight times. Maximum and minimum payloads are also defined for each glider. Because most gliders are designed to the same specifications of safety, the upper weight limit for a pilot, after allowing for a parachute, is usually 103 kilograms (227 lb). There is also a limit, 193 centimetres (6 ft 4 in), on the tallest pilots who can safely fit into a typical glider's cockpit.

== Challenges for the gliding movement ==
According to the FAI President, gliding as a sport faces challenges in the years ahead. These include:

- Time pressures on participants: gliding typically takes whole days that many people today find harder to devote. As a result, the average age of glider pilots is increasing.
- In some countries, the need for more land for housing is threatening small airfields. These airfields may also be used for other general aviation activities, and the addition of gliding may be difficult to accommodate. This can limit the number of available airfields and so it can require longer drives to reach them.
- Airspace: in many European countries, the growth of civil aviation is reducing the amount of uncontrolled airspace. In the U.S. new security requirements, and the growth of controlled airspace around cities, has also had some impact on where to fly.
- Competition from other activities: there is now a greater variety of similar sports such as hang gliding and paragliding that may attract potential glider pilots.
- Lack of publicity: without coverage by television or popular publications, many people are unaware that gliding is even a sport. Without this knowledge the public may have a poor understanding of how flying without an engine is possible and safe.
- Increasing costs: due to higher costs of fuel and insurance, and due to greater regulation requiring equipment such as new radios, or in some cases transponders, gliding costs have increased, although without the continuous use of engines and fuel, they are still considerably lower than traditional power flying.

== Related air sports ==
The two air sports that are most closely related to gliding are hang gliding and paragliding. Although all three sports rely on rising air, there are significant differences which are listed in detail in a comparison of sailplanes, hang gliders, and paragliders. The main difference is that both hang gliders and paragliders are simpler, less sophisticated and cheaper aircraft that use the pilot's feet as the undercarriage. All paragliders and most hang gliders have no protective structure around the pilot. However, the dividing line between basic gliders and sophisticated hang-gliders is becoming less distinct. For example, hang gliders typically use fabric wings, shaped over a framework, but hang gliders with rigid wings and three-axis controls are also available. The lower air speeds and lower glide ratios of typical hang gliders means that shorter cross-country distances are flown than in modern gliders. Paragliders are more basic craft. They are also foot-launched, but their wings usually have no frames and their shape is created by the flow and pressure of air. The airspeeds and glide ratios of paragliders are generally lower still than the typical hang gliders, and so their cross-country flights are even shorter. Radio-controlled gliding uses scale-models of gliders mainly for ridge soaring; however thermic aeromodelling craft are also used.

== See also ==
- Glider (sailplane)
- Glossary of gliding and soaring
- Flying and gliding animals
- List of notable glider pilots
- Gliding competition
