= Ben Patston =

English rugby union player and cricketer

Ben Patston (born 18 June 1985 (age 39) in Norwich) is an English Rugby Union player, currently playing for New Zealand side Dunedin in the Dunedin Championship. His position of choice is fly-half, however, he has been seen to play at full-back as well.

== Career ==
He joined Bedford from Northampton Saints in the summer of 2006 as part of the ongoing link between the two clubs. He signed a contract and immediately shone along with Ross Broadfoot, another new signing. He progressed throughout his first season at the club, and scored the club's try of the season with his chip and chase effort against Rotherham Titans RFC. He is known at Goldington Road for his ability to create something out of nothing and his daring game play. He has scored two last minute drop goals in his time at the Blues, and his all-round eagerness and personality makes him a fan favourite. He is 25 years old and was born in Norwich. He also was coached by former highlanders assistant coach Barry Matthews who now is coaching Waimate in the Harmesly cup and South Canterbury in the Heartland championship.

He played cricket for Norfolk in Minor counties cricket in 2008 and 2009.
