= Mark Davis (rugby union) =

- Full name: Mark Edwin Davis
- Born: 18 September 1970 (age 56) Newport, Wales

Rugby union career
- Position: Prop
International career
Years	Team	Apps	(Points)
1991	Wales	1	(0)

Mark Edwin Davis (born 18 September 1970) is a Welsh former rugby union player for Newport and Wales.

Davis, a loose-head prop, was born and raised in Newport. He attended St Julians Comprehensive School, played one game for Pontpool RFC, before transferring to Newport RFC where he remained until the 1994 season when he moved to Newbridge RFC. Davis was selected for the 1991 Wales rugby union tour of Australia. He featured in 3 games on the tour before his selection for the test at Brisbane's Ballymore Stadium. This was to be his only Wales cap and the tourists were comprehensively beaten. He was a member of the Welsh squad for the 1991 Rugby World Cup but did not feature in the match day squads.

== See also ==
- List of Wales national rugby union players
