= Brad Houston =

Canadian ice hockey and golf coach

Biographical details
- Born: Scarborough, Ontario, Canada

Playing career
- 1960–1962: Toronto Marlboros
- 1963–1966: New Hampshire
- Position: Defenseman

Coaching career (HC unless noted)
- 1969–1972: Colgate (assistant)
- 1972–1975: Colgate

Head coaching record
- Overall: 32-47-1 (.406)

Braden "Brad" Houston was a men’s and women’s ice hockey and golf coach. Houston served as the head coach for Colgate University Men’s Ice Hockey team from 1972-1975 and Head Coach of the Colgate Golf team for 28 years and was the Head Coach of the Colgate University Women’s Ice Hockey program transitioning it from a club program (1995-1997) to a varsity program (1997-1999) before retiring in 2005.

== Head coaching record ==
Record table
Season	Team	Overall	Conference	Standing	Postseason
Colgate Red Raiders (ECAC Hockey) (1972–1975)
1972-73	Colgate	11-14-0	5-12-0	15th	
1973-74	Colgate	11-16-1	5-14-1	16th	
1974-75	Colgate	10-17-0	5-17-0	15th	
Colgate:		32-47-1	15-43-1		
Total:		32-47-1			
National champion Postseason invitational champion Conference regular season champion Conference regular season and conference tournament champion Division regular season champion Division regular season and conference tournament champion Conference tournament champion
