= Darryl Broadfoot =

Scottish journalist

Darryl Broadfoot is a Scottish football writer.

He has been chief football writer with The Herald newspaper in Glasgow, as well as a regular guest on football shows such as Sportscene on BBC One Scotland, Radio Clyde and Setanta Sports.

== Early life ==
Born in 1979, Broadfoot grew up in Castlemilk, in Glasgow, and latterly Croftfoot where he attended King's Park Secondary and showed early promise, fittingly, in both English and football. A world-class weight lifter between the ages of 15 and 18, Broadfoot was also signed to Queen's Park Football Club where he captained the pre-season under-18s team. But to his great disappointment, he was eventually released. “I was utterly devastated, but I think I decided then that if I couldn’t be a footballer, I would be a football writer,” he says. Even as a lowly copy boy, the teenager loved the cut and thrust of the newsroom of Scotland's biggest daily broadsheet. Gradually he got to write second-division match reports and a year later he signed up for the HND in Journalism at what was then Bell College in Hamilton – now University of the West of Scotland. But he continued working at The Herald every Sunday on the sports desk, getting his name in the paper.

In October 2009 Broadfoot replaced Rob Shohouse as the Head of the Scottish Football Association's Communications Department.

He is also a good friend of Andrew Robertson.
