= Barton Thompson =

American lawyer and academic

Barton "Buzz" Thompson is an American lawyer and academic who focuses on climate, ecosystem services and conservation, freshwater, oceans and sustainable development.

Thompson is currently the Robert E. Paradise Professor in Natural Resources Law at Stanford University.
