= Ross Broadfoot =

English rugby union player

- Born: Patrick Ross Broadfoot; 8 March 1985 (age 41) London, England
- Height: 6 ft 0 in (1.83 m)
- Weight: 94 kg (207 lb)
- School: Whitgift School
- University: University of Cambridge

Rugby union career
- Position: Fly-half
- Current team: Old Elthamians
Senior career
| Years | Team | Apps | (Points) |
- London Irish
| 2004-06 | Leicester Tigers | 18 | (59) |
| 2006-07 | Bedford Blues | 28 | (96) |
| 2007-10 | Cambridge University | | |
| 2007-08 | London Irish | 1 | (7) |
| 2010-11 | Richmond | 20 | (239) |
| 2011-13 | Jersey | 32 | (205) |
| 2014- | Old Elthamians | | |
International career
| Years | Team | Apps | (Points) |
| 1999-2001 | England Group Schools | | |
| – | England u-18 | | |
| – | England u-19 | | |
| – | England u-21 | | |

Patrick Ross Broadfoot (born 8 March 1985) is an English rugby union player from Lewisham, London, England who currently plays for National League 2 South side Old Elthamians as a Fly-half. He has experience in English rugby union from the fourth tier (National League 2 South) right up to the Premiership.

== Early life ==
Broadfoot was educated at Whitgift School in Croydon before moving to the University of Cambridge. He also plays cricket.

== Career ==
Broadfoot started playing rugby for Whitgift School, where he won the U15 Daily Mail Cup in 1999, before he was signed to London Irish's academy where he quickly rose through it, eventually becoming part of the London Irish squad while still a student at Cambridge University. From there, he moved to Leicester Tigers and played for their first team in the English Premiership as well as playing on loan for Bedford Blues. After a lack of opportunities at Leicester, in 2008 he moved to Cambridge University R.U.F.C., where he became captain in the same year, to focus on his studies.

While playing for Cambridge Broadfoot made a brief return to his original club, London Irish, where he was called up to provide cover to the first team squad. In 2010 after graduating from Cambridge University, he moved to Richmond F.C. in order to also work as a commodities trader in London. In 2011, he moved to Jersey where despite Jersey being a full-time club, he remained a part-time player. In his debut season for Jersey, he and teammate Michael Le Bourgeois were listed as two of the top ten kickers in National League 1 and helped his club win the league title and promotion to the Championship.

In 2013, as Jersey moved toward becoming a fully professional championship team, Broadfoot took a year out of the game and left the club. In 2015 he returned to league rugby, signing for Old Elthamians in National League 2 South.

=== Representation ===
Broadfoot represented England Group Schools between 1999-2001. In addition, he has represented England under-18s He has also represented England at under-19 and under-21 levels. While at university, he represented Cambridge in its Varsity Match against Oxford University. In 2012 he was called up to play for the Barbarians.

== Honours ==
Youth/School Rugby

- Daily Mail Cup (U15) winner (Whitgift School): 1999

Jersey

- National League 1 champions: 2011-12
- Siam Cup winners: 2012
