= Tim Gardner =

American-born Canadian painter (born 1973)

Tim Gardner (born 1973 in Iowa City, Iowa) is an American-born Canadian painter known for his watercolors of his brothers and friends involved in youthful revels often set in nature.

Gardner obtained his BFA from the University of Manitoba in 1996 followed by an MFA from Columbia University in 1999, Shortly after finishing his graduate degree Gardner sold every work in his initial commercial gallery solo exhibition at the 303 Gallery to which he had been recommended by photographer Collier Schorr who was a visiting artist in residence during Garner's tenure at Columbia. To date Gardner has had four exhibitions at 303; 2000, 2001, 2003 and 2005.

Gardner has had two solo exhibitions at Stuart Shave/Modern Art in London(2003 and 2006). His work was the subject of a museum exhibition at the Indianapolis Museum of Contemporary Art in 2005. In 2007 he was the artist in residence at the National Portrait Gallery, London. Subsequently, the new works he created while onsite were the subject of a subsequent solo exhibition therein.
