= Online Contest (gliding) =

aerokurier Online Contest logo

The aerokurier Online Contest (OLC), a worldwide decentralized soaring competition for glider, hang glider, and paraglider pilots. The OLC is operated by Segelflugszene Gemeinnützige GmbH, a German not-for-profit founded in 2000. "Segelflugszene" translates as "gliding scene" in English.

Glider pilots upload secure log files from GNSS Flight Recorders to the OLC web site, and the server automatically scores their flight performance. Scores are adjusted by a handicap factor to allow for performance differences between different glider makes and models. The scores are summarized and displayed by airfield, club, region, country, and continent, along with the overall world standings. The handicap factor, and the scoring breakdowns, allow pilots to compete against one another on any level, from local to international.

The competition runs for a full year beginning and ending in early October. There is an annual OLC Symposium and award ceremony in late October each year in Gersfeld Germany, near the Wasserkuppe. Over 12000 pilots participated in the OLC worldwide in 2006.

== IGC-OLC World League ==
OLC FAI Logo

The IGC-OLC World League is a multi-national decentralized glider race sanctioned by the Fédération Aéronautique Internationale (FAI) that runs in conjunction with the Aerokurier Online-Contest for 19 consecutive weekends during the Northern Summer season. Club members flying from their Club's home airfield on the competition weekend days are scored on an optimized 2.5 hour sprint task, all in gliding flight, with the finish altitude no lower than the start. The longest cross-country distance flown in 2.5 hours is handicapped by the glider's performance index to generate a handicapped average speed. The top three club member's speeds are added to get the club's speed score for the weekend round. Each club is ranked by total speed in their home country, then the top 5 clubs from each country are entered in the international scoring for that round. Scoring is similar to Formula-One, with each higher finishing position worth one additional point for the round. Scoring is totaled at the end of the season to declare the overall winner.
