= List of New Zealand rugby union teams =

This is the list of the main first-class rugby union teams in New Zealand, including national teams, Super Rugby teams, National Provincial Championship teams, and Heartland Championship teams. The list does not include women's teams, local club or school teams, inactive teams, such as the North and South Island teams, or non-geographic representative teams, such as the New Zealand Universities, Marist, or Barbarians sides.

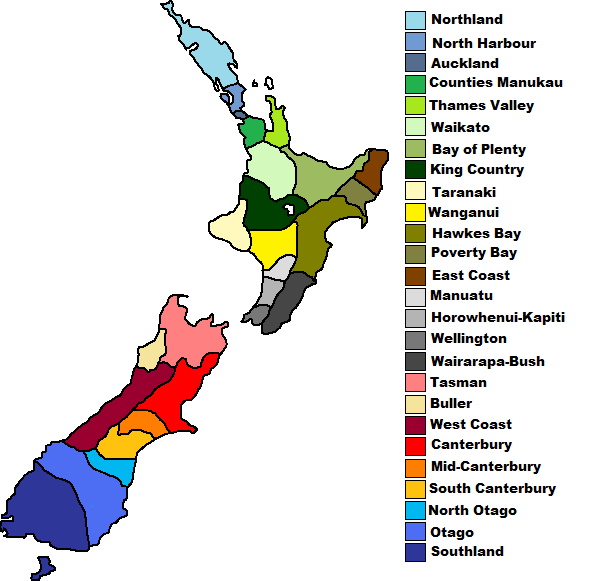
A map of NZRU provincial boundaries

== National representative teams ==
- New Zealand
- All Blacks XV
- New Zealand Maori
- All Blacks Sevens
- New Zealand U-20
- The Heartland XV
- New Zealand Schools
- New Zealand U85kg

== Super Rugby teams ==
- Blues
- Chiefs
- Crusaders
- Highlanders
- Hurricanes

== North Island unions ==
Team	Formed	Division	Notes
Auckland	1883	National Provincial Championship	
Bay of Plenty	1911	National Provincial Championship	Split from South Auckland
Counties Manukau	1955	National Provincial Championship	Formerly South Auckland 1926-1955
East Coast	1922	Heartland Championship	
Hawke's Bay	1884	National Provincial Championship	
Horowhenua-Kapiti	1893	Heartland Championship	
King Country	1922	Heartland Championship	Formerly part of South Auckland 1909-1921
Manawatu	1886	National Provincial Championship	
North Harbour	1985	National Provincial Championship	
Northland	1920	National Provincial Championship	Formerly North Auckland 1920-1994
Poverty Bay	1890	Heartland Championship	
Taranaki	1885	National Provincial Championship	
Thames Valley	1921	Heartland Championship	Formerly part of South Auckland 1909-1921
Waikato	1921	National Provincial Championship	Formerly part of South Auckland 1909-1921
Wairarapa Bush	1971	Heartland Championship	Merger with Wairarapa and Bush
Wanganui	1888	Heartland Championship	
Wellington	1879	National Provincial Championship	

== South Island unions ==
Team	Formed	Division	Notes
Buller	1894	Heartland Championship	
Canterbury	1879	National Provincial Championship	
Mid Canterbury	1904	Heartland Championship	Formerly Asburton County 1927-1952
North Otago	1904	Heartland Championship	
Otago	1881	National Provincial Championship	
South Canterbury	1888	Heartland Championship	
Southland	1887	National Provincial Championship	
Tasman	2006	National Provincial Championship	Merger of Marlborough and Nelson Bays
West Coast	1890	Heartland Championship	

== Defunct unions ==
Team	Timeframe	Changes
Bush	1890 - 1971	merged with Wairarapa in 1971
Central Vikings	1997-1998	short-term merger of Manawatu and Hawke's Bay
Golden Bay-Motueka	1920-1967	merged with Nelson in 1967
Manawhenua	1924-1933	short-term merger of Horowhenua and Manawatu
Marlborough	1888-2005	
Nelson	1885-1967	merged with Golden Bay-Motueka in 1967
Nelson Bays	1968-2005	Merger of Golden Bay-Motueka and Nelson
South Auckland	1909-1921	Split from Auckland
South Auckland	1926-1955	Split from Auckland, later became Counties
Wairarapa	1886 - 1971	merged with Bush in 1971

== See also ==
- List of defunct New Zealand rugby union teams
