= List of defunct New Zealand rugby union teams =

These New Zealand Rugby union teams are now defunct:

- Ashburton County (1927–1952) — changed to Mid Canterbury
- Bush (1890-1971) — merged into Wairarapa-Bush
- Central Vikings (1997–1998) — short-term merger of Hawke's Bay and Manawatu
- Golden Bay-Motueka (1920–1967) — merged into Nelson Bays Rugby Union
- Manawhenua (1924–1933) — short-term merger of Manawatu and Horowhenua
- Marlborough (1888–2005) — merged into Tasman
- Moana Pasifika (2022-2026) — Club disbanded in 2026 due to financial hardship
- Nelson (1885–1967) — merged into Nelson Bays Rugby Union with Golden Bay-Motuekea Rugby Union
- Nelson Bays (1968–2005) — merged into Tasman
- North Auckland (1920–1994) — changed to Northland
- South Auckland Rugby Union (1909) (1909–1921) — split three ways to Waikato, King Country and Thames Valley
- South Auckland Rugby Union (1926) (1926–1955) — changed to South Auckland Counties in 1955, then Counties Rugby Football Union until 1995 then changed to Counties Manukau Rugby Football Union
