= Rugby union in New Zealand =

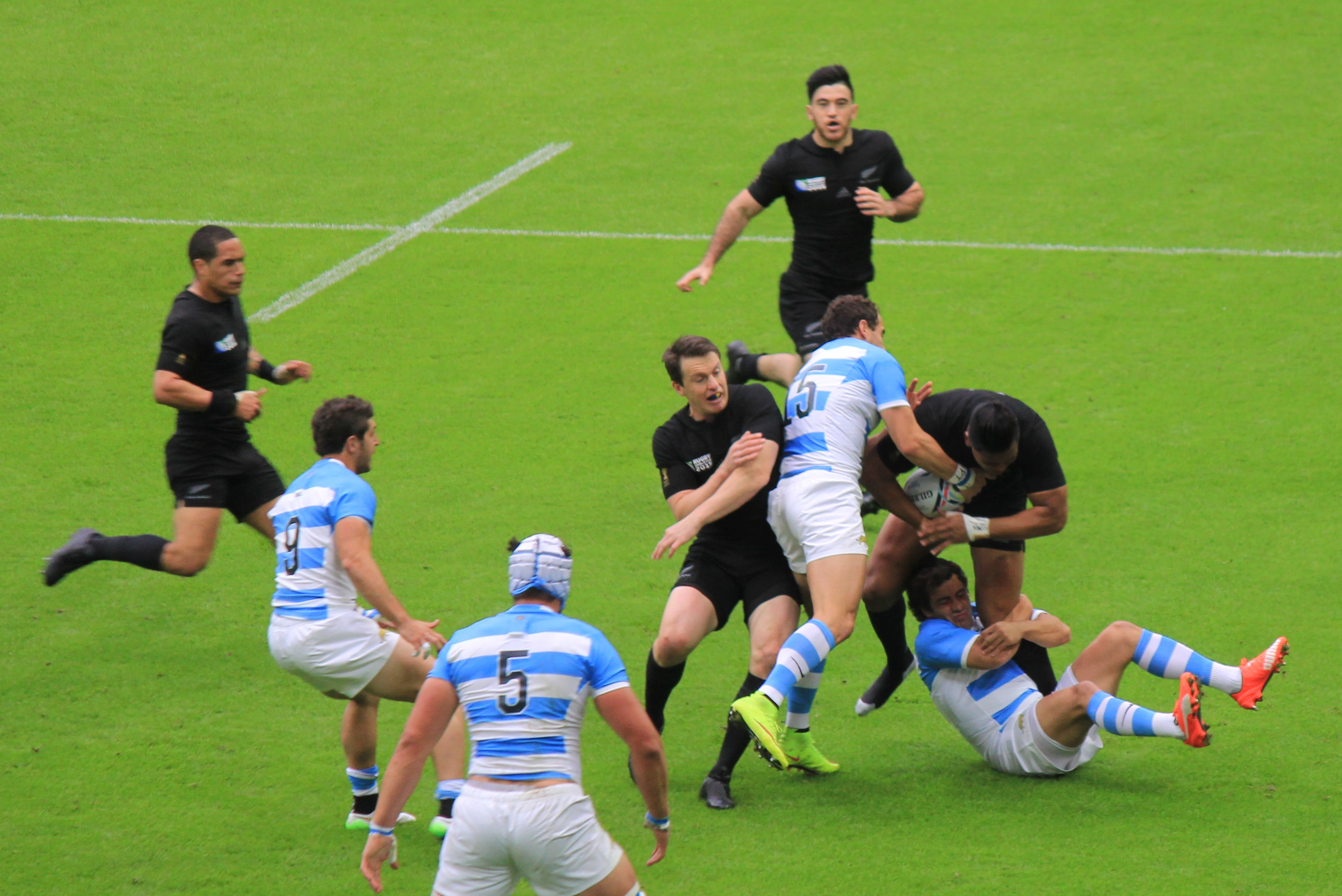
- New Zealand playing Argentina at the 2015 World Cup
- Country: New Zealand
- Governing body: NZR
- National team: New Zealand
- Nickname: All Blacks
- First played: 1870, Nelson
- Registered players: 146,893 (total); 28,648 (adults)
- Clubs: ~500

Club competitions
- Super Rugby; National Provincial Championship; Heartland Championship; Ranfurly Shield; Hanan Shield

International competitions
- Rugby World Cup; Women's Rugby World Cup; The Rugby Championship; Nations Championship; Mid-year rugby union internationals; End-of-year rugby union internationals; Rugby World Cup Sevens; Sevens World Series; World Rugby Women's Sevens Series

Audience records
- Single match: 109,874; Australia v New Zealand, (Telstra Stadium); 2000 Tri Nations Series, 15 July 2000

Rugby union (usually referred to as simply "rugby") has been played in New Zealand since 1870 and is the most popular sport in the country as well as being the de facto national sport. In a 2023 survey, 75% of respondents said they followed the sport.

In their respective World Rugby Rankings (Note: as of 20 October 2025.), the men's national team, the All Blacks, is currently ranked second and the women's national team, the Black Ferns, is currently ranked third. The country co-hosted and won the first ever Rugby World Cup in 1987, and hosted and won the 2011 Rugby World Cup. The men have won three World Cups (1987, 2011, 2015), the second most of any country after South Africa.

The New Zealand women's rugby team, the Black ferns, have won the Women's Rugby World Cup on six occasions, and were rugby sevens finalists for men and women.

The top domestic club competitions are the professional National Provincial Championship and amateur Heartland Championship, and above them the transnational Super Rugby, in which New Zealand has 5 out of 11 franchises.

== History ==
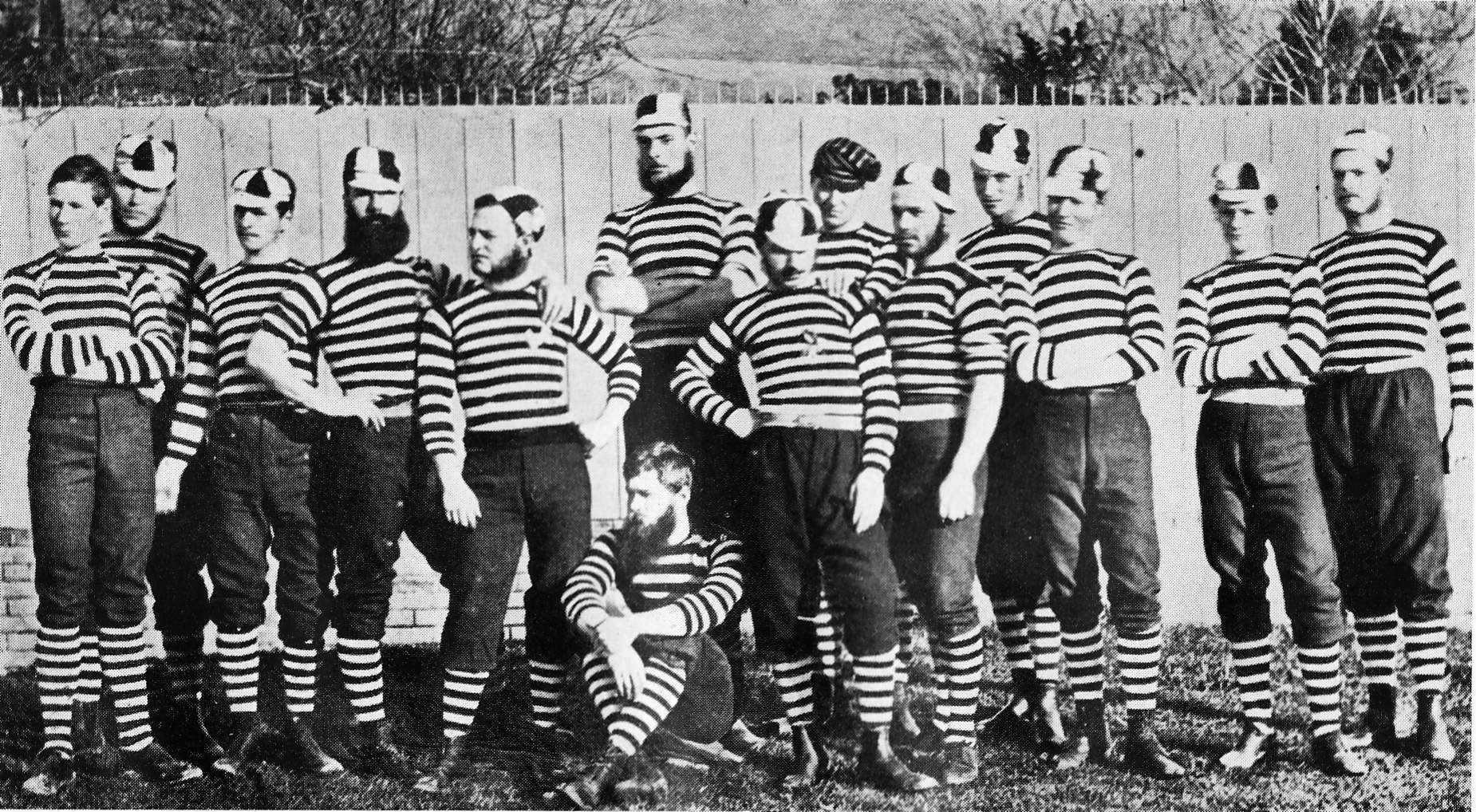
The Wellington RFU team of 1875

Before Europeans arrived in New Zealand, the Māori were playing a ball game called kī-o-rahi which greatly resembled Australian Rules Football and rugby football. It has been suggested that this may have influenced New Zealand playing styles, especially amongst the indigenous population.

Various codes of football were played in New Zealand in the years following white settlement. Christchurch Football Club, which is now the oldest rugby club in the country, was founded in 1863. It played by its own rules for many years. Rugby football was first introduced to New Zealand in 1870 by Charles John Monro, son of the then-Speaker of the House of Representatives, David Monro. He encountered the game while studying at Christ's College Finchley, in East Finchley, London, England, and on his return introduced the game to Nelson College, who played the first rugby union match against Nelson football club on 14 May it was the 15th . A visit to Wellington by Munro later that same year resulted in an organised match between Nelson and Wellington. By the following year, the game had been formalised in Wellington, and subsequently rugby was taken up in Wanganui and Auckland in 1873 and Hamilton in 1874. In 1875, the first representative team was formed, being a combined-clubs Auckland team which toured the South. It is thought that by the mid-1870s, the game had been taken up by the majority of the colony.

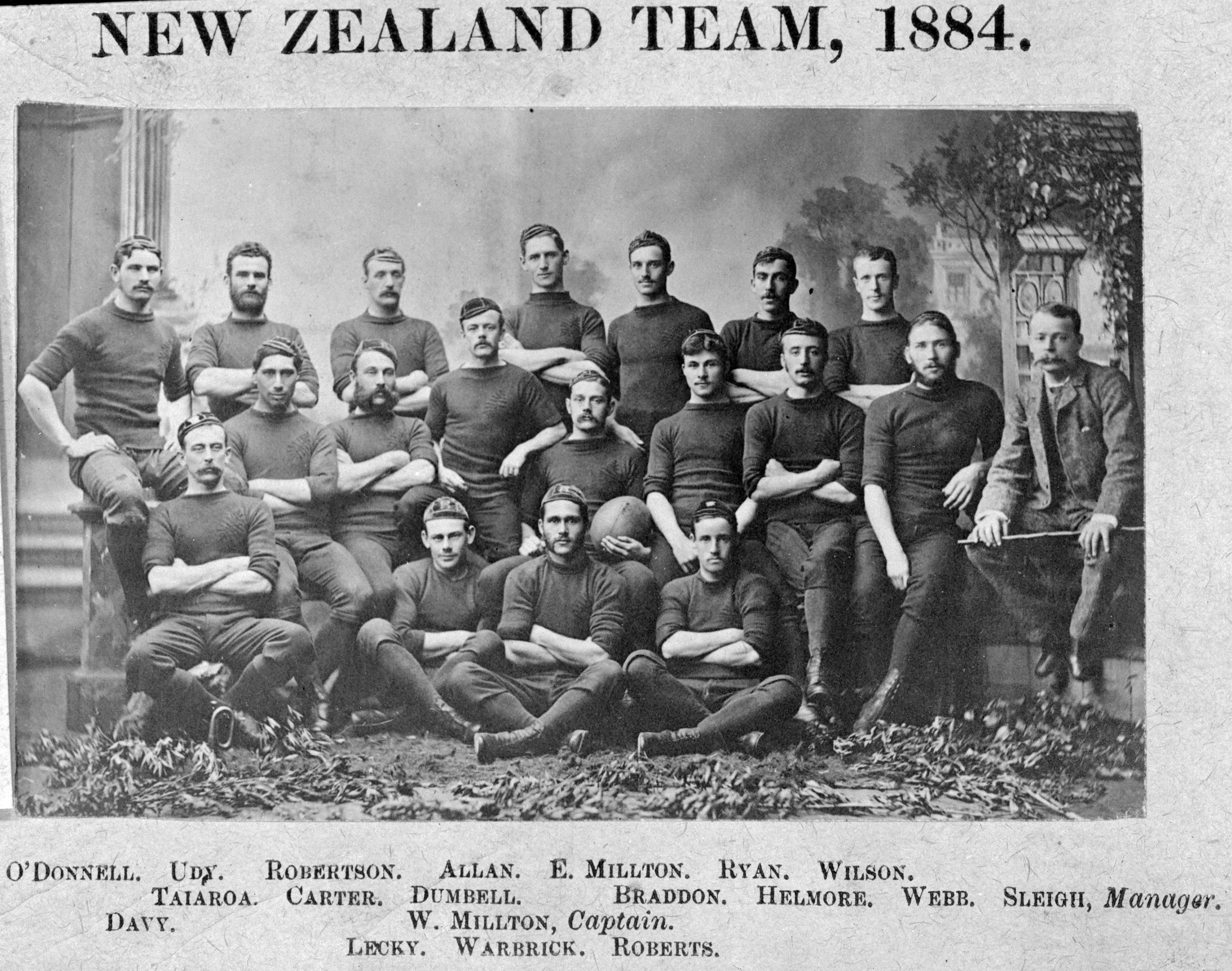
The 1884 team that toured New South Wales, Australia

The latter stages of the 1870s saw the emergence of a more formal structure, with Unions being formed in both Canterbury and Wellington during 1879. In 1882, the first international rugby side toured New Zealand, a New South Wales side that visited both islands during the latter part of the year. Two years later, a New Zealand team visited New South Wales, wearing blue jerseys with a golden fern. The team won all their games. In 1888, the first ever British Isles rugby team tour took place, visiting New Zealand and Australia. The visitors won all their New Zealand games except for one, losing to Auckland. During 1888-89, the New Zealand Native team became the first from a colony to visit Britain. In 1892 the New Zealand Rugby Football Union (NZRFU), now known as the New Zealand Rugby Union (NZRU), was established, to act as the national governing body of the sport. Following the establishment of the national governing body, the first NZRFU national sanctioned tour was undertaken in 1893, when a ten-game tour of Australia was played. The team was captained by Thomas Ellison.

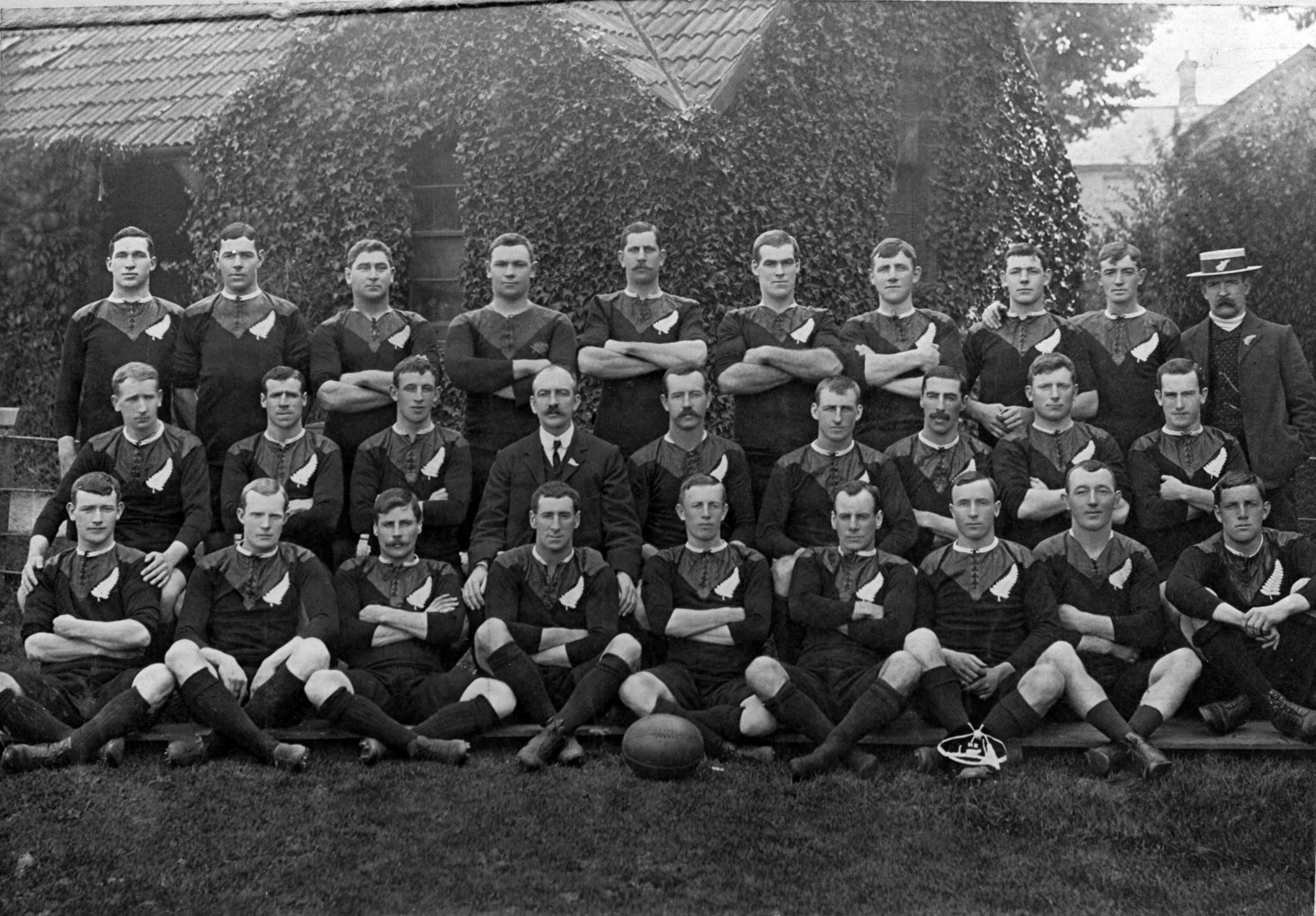
The 1905 All Blacks, named The Originals

In 1902, the governor of New Zealand, the fifth Earl of Ranfurly presented a trophy shield to the Auckland side, who were undefeated in provincial competition that year. The shield became known as the Ranfurly Shield. Three years later, a 1905 New Zealand team, who became known as the "Originals", toured the British Isles and France winning all of their games apart from controversially losing the test against Wales. As the team swept through Britain, some of the players took note of how rugby (league) was being played in the North of England. One player, Aucklander George Smith met with Sydney entrepreneur James J. Giltinan on his way home, and discussed the opportunities of such a game. Meanwhile, New Zealander Albert Henry Baskervill had contacted the Northern Union to arrange a New Zealand tour, as he had just read about the game in the Wellington Post. The NZRFU discouraged any involvement from its players and officials, nonetheless, a team departed a travelled to Sydney first, and were there labelled the All Golds, a play on All Blacks in reference to the player payments. The team went on to tour England. They played an import role in rugby league.

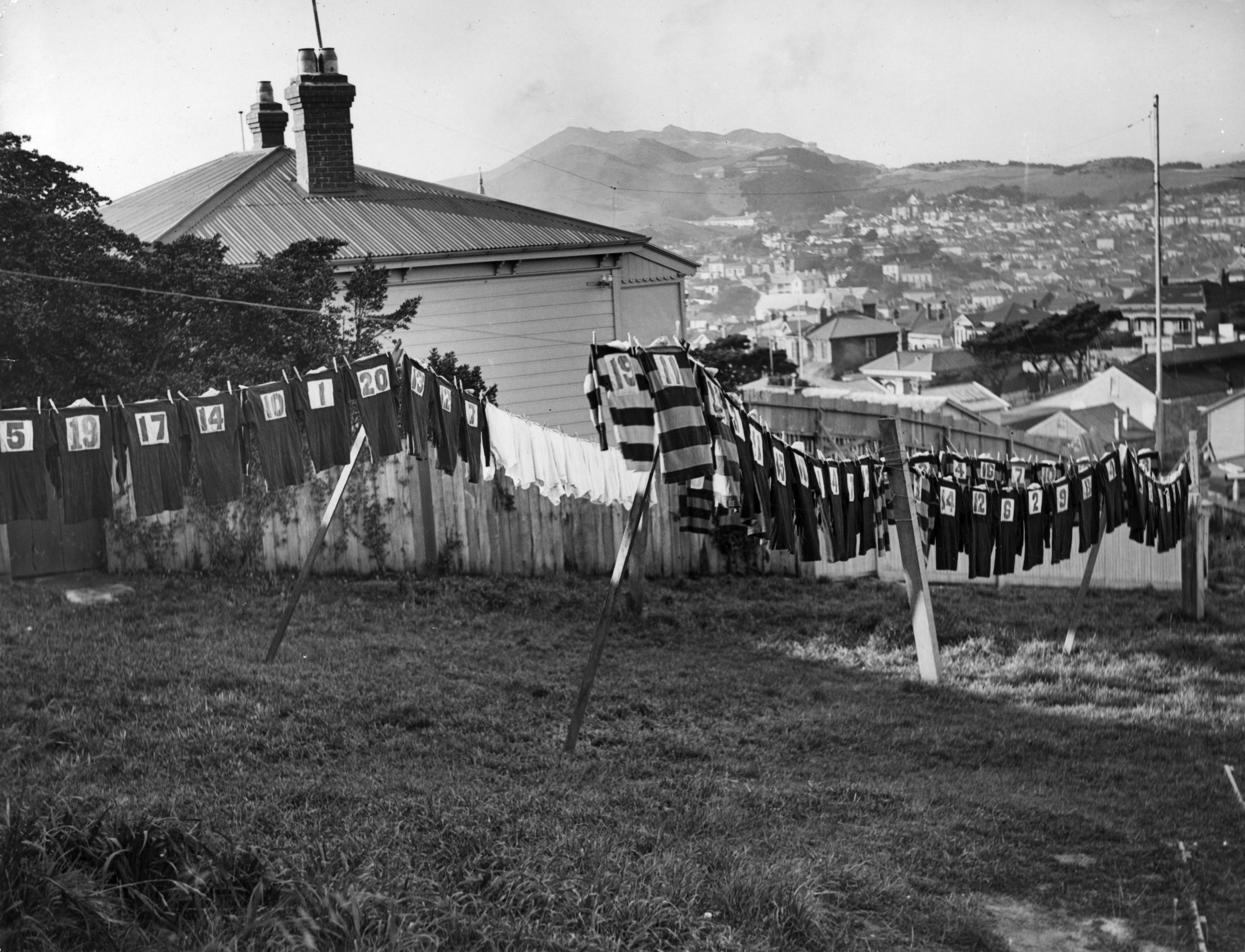
Rugby jerseys drying, Wellington c. 1930s

The 1930s saw a period of skill development for rugby in New Zealand. The 1940 All Black tour of South Africa was one of the first sporting events cancelled due to the Second World War. Rugby was however played in services sport, with games being played with South African allies during the North African desert campaign, also, most domestic competitions were suspended during this time. In 1976, the first ever season of the National Provincial Championship (succeeded in 2006 by the Air New Zealand Cup and Heartland Championship) went underway. In its inaugural format, Division One was made up of seven North Island teams and four South Island. The remaining provinces contested a split second division, though South and North teams did not meet each other, instead played their respective Island clubs. There was a separate relegation system in place for each the North and South, ensuring the number of teams from each island.

The 1981 Springbok Tour, or "The Tour", went down as one of the most controversial rugby tours ever. From July to September, the Springboks toured New Zealand. Rugby fans filled the stadiums, yet equal numbers of fans protested the games outside the stadiums. Police were divided into Red and Blue riot squads for the tour, and in preparation for possible trouble, all spectators were told to assemble in sports grounds at least an hour before kickoff. At a game at Rugby Park in Hamilton, around 350 protesters pulled down a fence and invaded the pitch. Police, already very worried, pulled the match when they found out a light plane piloted by a protester was headed to fly around the stadium. A protest turned violent in Wellington the following week, escalating the situation. During the final test match at Eden Park, a low flying plane dropped flour bombs over the pitch. A subsequent 1985 All Black tour was prevented by the High Court, but an unofficial tour took place the following year.

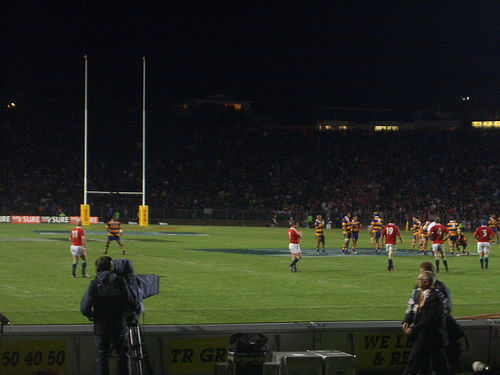
The 2005 British & Irish Lions tour to New Zealand.

In 1987, the NZRFU wrote to the International Rugby Football Board, later known as the International Rugby Board (IRB) and now as World Rugby, requesting the possibility of hosting an inaugural Rugby World Cup. The 1987 World Cup was eventually given to both New Zealand and Australia. The All Blacks made it to the final, where they would meet France. The All Blacks won and were crowned the first ever World Champions. In the 1980s, New Zealand provincial sides participated in the South Pacific Championship, along with teams from Australia and Fiji. In 1992 this type of competition was relaunched as the Super Sixes, and was expanded to the Super 10 later. As rugby entered the professional era in the mid-1990s, along with South Africa and Australia, New Zealand formed SANZAR, which would see them start a provincial rugby competition, the Super 12. The 1996 Super 12 season saw the Auckland Blues finish in second place, whilst the Waikato Chiefs 6th, the Otago Highlanders 8th, the Wellington Hurricanes 9th, and the Canterbury Crusaders 12th. The SANZAR agreement also saw the formation of the Tri Nations Series, a contest between the respective national sides, the All Blacks, Springboks and Wallabies. The All Blacks won the first series. Beginning in 2012, the Argentina Pumas entered the competition, which was renamed The Rugby Championship. New Zealand was supposed to jointly host the 2003 World Cup with Australia, but a disagreement with the IRB saw the tournament given to Australia in its entirety. In 2006, New Zealand won the right to host the 2011 World Cup.

== Culture ==
In New Zealand there are 520 clubs, 141,726 registered players and 2,309 referees. In colonial New Zealand, rugby football served to maintain loyalty to the Crown within the emigrant population, whilst introducing British culture to the Māori population. It was the New Zealand Natives' Rugby Tour of 1888/89 showed that New Zealand could compete with other nations. Similarly, the 1905-06 tour, in which the All Blacks went very close to a clean sweep tour (with just one loss against Wales), helped to create a sense of national pride around the All Blacks, as they appeared physically superior and pulled off an admirable performance on their British tour. It is also thought that this saw the emergence of the Kiwi as a national symbol. Rugby dominates New Zealand's sports media. Being the unofficial national winter sport of New Zealand, rugby attracts large sporting attendances and viewership. As many as 5,000 people have turned out to watch All Black training sessions, while the final of 2011 Rugby World Cup was the single most watched television event in New Zealand history. There is a pay TV channel dedicated to rugby in New Zealand.

=== Haka ===
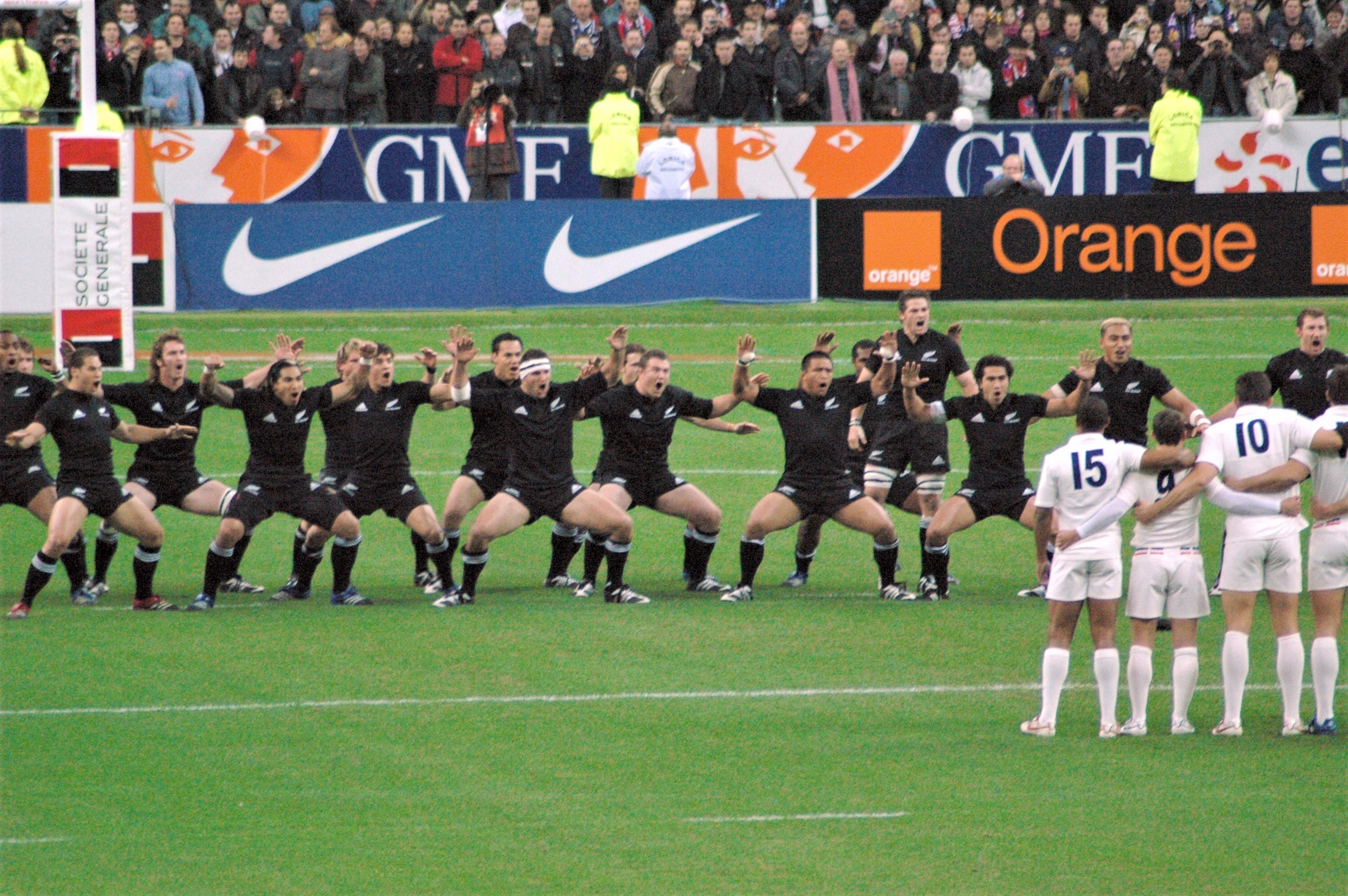
All Blacks perform a haka before a match, 2006

The haka is a traditional Māori challenge that has become closely associated with New Zealand rugby at an international level. There are thousands of variations of haka that are performed by various tribes and cultural groups throughout New Zealand; one of the best known is called Ka Mate. The All Blacks have performed a haka before matches since the late 19th century.

== Ethnicity ==
Early forms of rugby had been played in New Zealand since the 1860s. While these were initially associated with the settler elite and the military, other colonists accustomed to hard physical labour also soon took part.

In 1872, 'Wirihana' became the first recorded Māori rugby player when he turned out for Wanganui 'Country' in a 20-a-side fixture against their urban counterparts. While some all-Māori clubs were formed, such as Kiri Kiri near Thames, mixed teams were more common in areas like Poverty Bay which had substantial Māori populations.

Māori living in areas that had supported the Crown during the New Zealand Wars of the 1860s seem to have been the first to take up the sport. Jack Taiaroa and Joseph Warbrick were key members of the first representative New Zealand team, which toured New South Wales in 1884.

== Governance ==
The New Zealand Rugby (NZR) is responsible for rugby in the country. The NZRU was formed in 1892 as the New Zealand Rugby Football Union with the original representation of seven unions though there was the original significant absence of Canterbury, Otago and Southland. The NZRFU joined the IRFB in 1949. There are 26 member unions within New Zealand. Every province also has its own union. In late 2005, New Zealand won the right to host the 2011 World Cup.

== National teams ==
=== All Blacks ===
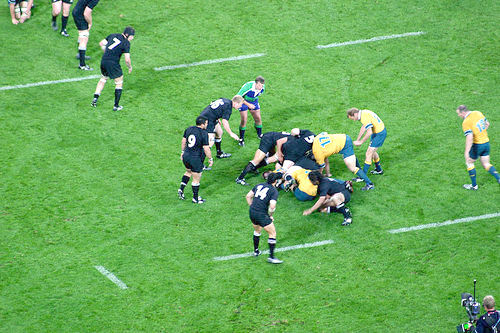
The All Blacks playing the Wallabies in August 2005

New Zealand, commonly referred to as the All Blacks, are the most successful team in international rugby. They have a positive winning record against all Test nations, and have a win record of over 74%. The first All Blacks Test match was played against Australia at Sydney Cricket Ground on 15 August 1903. New Zealand won 22 - 3, with The Sydney Morning Herald saying, 'The present New Zealand team have shown form so far in advance of every fifteen opposed to them that it seems almost impossible for Australia to put a side into the field with any hope of victory...'. The All Blacks were winners of the inaugural Rugby World Cup in 1987 and were runners-up in 1995. The All Blacks were the only team to have reached the semi-final stage at every World Cup until the 2007 World Cup where they were defeated 20-18 by France in the quarter-finals. New Zealand won its second Rugby World Cup on home soil in 2011. In 2015 New Zealand became the first country to win back to back Rugby World Cups beating Australia 34-17 in the final played at Twickenham on 31 October. The All Blacks dominate the list of winners of the World Rugby Men's 15s Player of the Year, with ten wins and is the only nation with players winning the award multiple times, Richie McCaw (2006, 2009 and 2010), Dan Carter (2005, 2012 and 2015) and Beauden Barrett (2016 and 2017).

=== Junior All Blacks ===
The Junior All Blacks are not an age grade side, but are the second national team behind the All Blacks. They were formerly known as New Zealand A, but the name was changed for marketing purposes. They competed in the Pacific Nations Cup competition alongside Australia A, Fiji, Japan, Samoa and Tonga. They won the inaugural IRB Pacific 5 Nations competition in 2006. In 2007 Australia A joined with the competition, changing its name to Pacific Nations Cup. The Junior All Blacks repeated their 2006 success in 2007 winning the competition with victories in all five of their matches including with a 50−0 thumping of their Australian counterparts at Carisbrook Dunedin. The New Zealand Māori played in the 2008 Pacific Nations Cup. No New Zealand team has played in Pacific Nations Cup since then.

=== Māori All Blacks ===
The Māori All Blacks, previously known as New Zealand Māori, is a representative side that play at home and on tour. The Maori All Blacks team is a selection of the best of New Zealand’s Maori rugby players. All contracted players are able to nominate themselves as eligible for the Maori All Blacks and, in the event a player is considered for selection, the team’s kaumatua (cultural advisor) will trace the player’s whakapapa (genealogy) to confirm his heritage and eligibility. The primary objective of this team is to provide an aspirational pathway for young Maori rugby players. The team was formerly established in 1910, and has played many of the world's top Test teams, beating teams such as England, Ireland and the British & Irish Lions.

=== Heartland XV ===
Previously known as the New Zealand Divisional XV, this team was revamped in 2006. Only players who have participated in the previous season's Heartland Championship are eligible for selection; this makes it effectively a Heartland all-star team. This team traditionally goes on second-level tours; their first tour under the Heartland name was a 2006 end-of-year tour to Argentina, where they played two provincial teams and the Argentina A side, splitting the provincial matches and losing to Argentina A.

Their second tour, in November 2008, was a two-match trip to the USA. The first match, in San Francisco, saw them defeat a Pacific Coast XV 39–12. They then travelled to Salt Lake City to take on a USA Select XV in one of the first events held in the new Rio Tinto Stadium, and came from behind to notch a 19–14 win.

Shortly after the tour, the NZRU announced that the Heartland XV would not be assembled in 2009, and would in the future tour every two years.

=== Black Ferns ===
The Black Ferns are the top national women's team in New Zealand. They are the most successful team in the history of Women's Rugby World Cup winning 6 times in total most recently in 2021.

=== Sevens ===
Sevens is a form of rugby union which involves 7 players per team rather than 15 in the regular game. The games are 7 minutes per half (10 minutes in a competition final) rather than 40 minutes per half in the 15-man game. The New Zealand Sevens team compete in the World Rugby Sevens Series, the Sevens World Cup, and the Commonwealth Games Sevens. The New Zealand Sevens team were undefeated in the Sevens events in the Commonwealth Games until 2014, when South Africa defeated them in the final. Since the inception of the Sevens Series in 1999–2000, the New Zealand Sevens team have dominated the series, winning the first six seasons of the competition (2000–2005) and 12 times in all, most recently in 2014.

=== Under 21s ===
The New Zealand Under 21s rugby union team is for players aged under 21. New Zealand Under 21 (formerly Colts) was first selected in 1955 and played annually until 2007. The Under 21s enjoyed great success on the world stage, winning world titles in 2000, 2001, 2003, and 2004.

=== Under 20s ===
New Zealand formed an Under 20 side for the first time in 2008. The catalyst for the creation of this side was World Rugby's decision to scrap its under-19 and under-21 world championships in favour of a single under-20 tournament, originally known as the IRB Junior World Championship and now known as the World Rugby Under 20 Championship. The side won the first four editions of the competition (2008–2011), and again in 2015 and 2017.

=== Under 19s ===
The New Zealand Under 19s rugby team is for players aged under 19. New Zealand Under 19 was selected for the first time in 1990, and played annually until 2007. They were strong contenders during their time, and won the IRB Under 19 World Championship in 1999, 2001, 2002, 2004, and 2007

=== Schoolboys ===
The New Zealand Schoolboys rugby union team is for secondary school students to help them aim for and achieve higher honours. Past schoolboy players include Aaron Mauger, Mils Muliaina, and Joe Rokocoko.

=== Universities ===
The New Zealand Universities rugby team is composed of the best players from New Zealand's six university clubs. The team has played in many international fixtures including famous wins over the British and Irish Lions in their 1977 tour and the Springboks in 1956. Many former NZU players have gone on to play for the All Blacks including David Kirk, Kieran Read and Conrad Smith. Today the team takes part in a biannual tour to Japan and consists mainly of amateur club players.

== Domestic competitions ==
=== Super Rugby ===
While not domestic, Super Rugby is an international competition featuring teams from New Zealand, Australia and South Africa. The competition, governed by SANZAR, was formed in 1996 as Super 12 after the game turned professional. It became Super 14 in 2006 with the addition of one team each from Australia and South Africa, and Super Rugby in 2011 when a fifth Australian team joined. The current format includes five teams from each participating country.

With the expansion to 15 teams, the competition format was dramatically changed. The league phase, originally a single round-robin, was replaced by a three-conference format, with each conference consisting of teams in one of the participating countries. Each team plays home-and-away against the other teams in its conference, plus single games against four teams in each other conference. The finals series was also changed. In the Super 12 and Super 14 eras, this was a knockout series involving the top four finishers. The knockout format was retained for Super Rugby, but now involves the three conference winners plus the top three non-winners without regard to conference. Currently, five New Zealand teams participate in the competition, these being Crusaders, Blues, Hurricanes, Chiefs and Highlanders.

The competition was further reorganised in 2016 with a permanent sixth team from South Africa and new entries based in Argentina (Jaguares) and Japan (Sunwolves). At that time, the competition was split into Australasian and African groups (with the latter including the Argentine and Japanese teams), each in turn being divided into two conferences. All of the New Zealand teams formed one conference. The finals series expanded to eight teams, with the top team from each conference, plus the top three non-winners from the Australasian group and the top non-winner from the African group, qualifying.

New Zealand teams have dominated Super Rugby for much of its history, winning 12 of the 18 titles decided to date. The Crusaders are the most successful club, having won 10 titles in 1998, 1999, 2000, 2002, 2005, 2006, 2008, 2017, 2018 and 2019. The Blues, Highlanders & Chiefs are the other New Zealand teams to have captured the title, the Blues having won in 1996, 1997 and 2003, the Chiefs winning in 2012 and 2013 and the Highlanders winning in 2015. Australia's Brumbies (two titles), Reds (one) and NSW Waratahs (one) and South Africa's Bulls (three) are the only teams from outside New Zealand to have won a title.

Club	Location	Feeder Area(s) (National Provincial Championship and Heartland Championship Provinces)
Blues	Auckland	National Provincial Championship Provinces: Auckland; North Harbour; Northland
Chiefs	Hamilton	National Provincial Championship Provinces: Bay of Plenty; Counties Manukau; Waikato; Taranaki; Heartland Championship Provinces: King Country; Thames Valley
Crusaders	Christchurch	National Provincial Championship Provinces: Canterbury; Tasman (formed by merger of Marlborough and Nelson Bays); Heartland Championship Provinces: Buller; Mid Canterbury; South Canterbury; West Coast
Highlanders	Dunedin	National Provincial Championship Provinces: Otago; Southland; Heartland Championship Provinces: North Otago
Hurricanes	Wellington	National Provincial Championship Provinces: Hawke's Bay; Manawatu; Wellington; Heartland Championship Provinces: East Coast; Horowhenua-Kapiti; Poverty Bay; Wairarapa Bush; Wanganui

=== Bunnings NPC ===
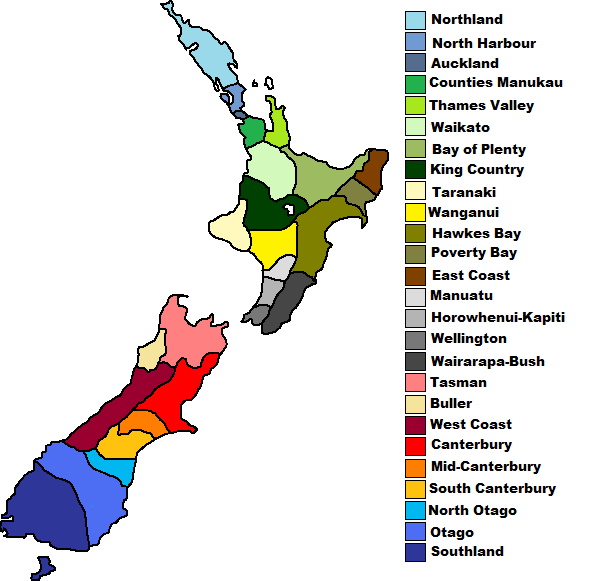
Map of all provincial unions within New Zealand.

The Bunnings NPC is the premier domestic competition in New Zealand rugby. It has previously been known as the Mitre 10 Cup, the ITM Cup and the Air New Zealand Cup as sponsorship deals changed IA fully professional competition contested by 14 provincial teams, it is the successor to Division One of the country's former domestic competition, the National Provincial Championship (NPC).

The Bunnings NPC features the following teams from the former NPC Division One:

- Auckland
- Bay of Plenty
- Canterbury
- North Harbour
- Northland
- Otago
- Southland
- Taranaki
- Waikato
- Wellington

It also features three teams from the former NPC Division Two:

- Counties Manukau
- Manawatu
- Hawke's Bay

plus one newly formed team, the merger of the former NPC Division Two teams of Marlborough and Nelson Bays:

- Tasman (formed by the merger of the Marlborough and Nelson Bays unions)

Beginning in 2011, the Mitre 10 Cup split into two divisions—the top-level Premiership and second-level Championship, each with seven teams. Promotion and relegation was reintroduced to the top level of provincial rugby; the winner of the Championship replaces the bottom team of the Premiership; the winner of the Meads Cup replaces the bottom team of the Championship.

=== Heartland Championship ===
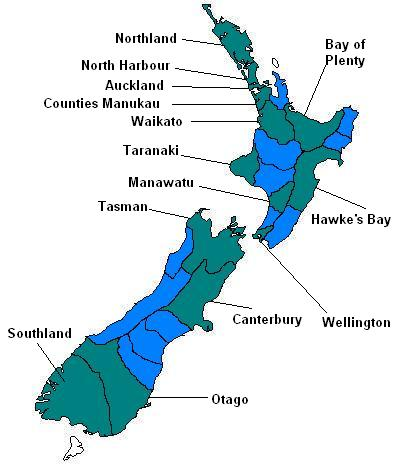
A map of NZRU provincial boundaries. The teams in teal are Air New Zealand Cup teams, whilst the teams in light blue are Heartland Championship teams.

The Heartland Championship is an amateur competition contested among 12 teams from the former NPC Divisions Two and Three. It was also founded in 2006 as a result of the reorganisation of the NPC, and is directly run by the NZRU. Its teams compete for the Meads and Lochore Cups, named after famous All Blacks Colin Meads and Brian Lochore. The participating teams are:

- Buller
- East Coast
- Horowhenua-Kapiti
- King Country
- Mid Canterbury
- North Otago
- Poverty Bay
- South Canterbury
- Thames Valley
- Wairarapa Bush
- Wanganui
- West Coast

=== Ranfurly Shield ===
The Ranfurly Shield, also known as the Log o' Wood, has been competed for on a challenge basis by provincial teams since 1904. The current holders of the shield become "defenders" in every game played on their home ground, if the opposition or "challenger" defeats them, they become the new holder of the Shield. The Shield was first presented by the Governor of New Zealand, the Earl of Ranfurly.

The current holders are Otago.

=== Club ===
Each Bunnings NPC and Heartland Championship region conducts local intra-provincial club competitions. The club level is often followed by the local media and has local support. Clubs often rely on the Pub Charity in order to survive. In total, 520 clubs are affiliated to the NZRU.

== International competition ==
=== World Cup ===
The Rugby World Cup is considered the ultimate rugby competition. The New Zealand All Blacks won the first World Cup in 1987, beating France in the final. Since then the All Blacks were favourites on several occasions, but did not win for another 24 years. New Zealand lost to Australia in the semi-final in 2003 and fell to the French team in the quarter-final of the 2007 Rugby World Cup. Intense lobbying by the NZRFU and the New Zealand Government helped New Zealand secure hosting rights to the 2011 Rugby World Cup. The All Blacks regained the World Cup on home soil in 2011. They went on to be the first country in history to win the Rugby World Cup two times consecutively, as they won the 2015 competition in England.

=== Women's Rugby World Cup ===
The Women's Rugby World Cup is considered the top rugby competition for women. The New Zealand Black Ferns first won the world cup in 1998, beating the United States in the final. Since then the Black Ferns have won in 2002, 2006, 2010 and 2017. New Zealand lost to Ireland in Pool B in 2014. and didn't qualify in 1994.

Intense lobbying by the New Zealand Government helped New Zealand secure hosting rights to the 2021 Women's Rugby World Cup by beating out neighbour Australia. It will be the first time the tournament will have been played in the southern hemisphere.

=== Tri Nations and The Rugby Championship ===
The Tri Nations, now known as The Rugby Championship, is an annual competition involving the strongest rugby nations from the Southern Hemisphere. When the competition was established in 1996, it featured New Zealand, Australia and South Africa. Originally, this involved each country playing one home and one away game against both other countries. From 2006 the competition was expanded with each nation playing both the other nations three times (except in Rugby World Cup years, when it reverted to a home-and-away series). The All Blacks won the first series in 1996, as well as the subsequent 1997 series. They have been the most dominant team in the series; during the Tri Nations era (1996–2011), they won 10 titles to the Springboks' three and the Wallabies' two.

In 2012, Argentina joined the competition, which became The Rugby Championship. With four nations now involved, the tournament returned to a straight home-and-away format except in World Cup years, when it is conducted in a single round-robin format. The All Blacks won the first three editions of the renamed competition (2012–2014), giving them a total of 13 Tri Nations and Rugby Championship titles.

The Freedom Cup is contested between New Zealand and South Africa, first as part of the Tri Nations and now in The Rugby Championship.

=== Bledisloe Cup ===
The Bledisloe Cup reflects the rivalry between Australia and New Zealand and has been contested since the early 1930s. The Bledisloe Cup was irregularly contested between 1931 and 1981, usually during tours by the two nations. During this period, New Zealand won it 19 times and Australia four times. In 1982 it became an annual contest, being contested either as a single game or in a three-test series. Between 1982 and 1995 New Zealand won the Cup 11 times and Australia three times. Since 1996 the Bledisloe Cup has been contested as part of the Tri Nations/Rugby Championship. In total, the All Blacks have won 67 Bledisloe Cup games, Australia 30, with four draws as of mid 2006.

=== World Cup Sevens ===
The Rugby World Cup Sevens is World Rugby's equivalent to the (15-man) Rugby World Cup. It is also held every four years, and was originally scheduled in the odd-numbered years in which the 15-man RWC was not held. The competition was first held in 1993. New Zealand won in 2001, were losing finalists to Fiji in 2005, and won the most recent edition in 2013 in Moscow. The 2013 edition was originally intended to be the last because of the impending establishment of an Olympic sevens tournament in 2016. World Rugby (then known as the IRB) later decided to retain the World Cup Sevens, and established a new four-year cycle in which the World Cup would be held in even-numbered non-Olympic years. As such, the next edition was held in 2018 in the San Francisco Bay Area.

=== World Rugby Sevens Series ===
The World Rugby Sevens Series, held annually since 1999–2000, is a series of several international tournaments, expanding from nine to ten for the upcoming 2015–16 series, featuring full international sevens teams. New Zealand have been the dominant team throughout the series' history, winning the first six editions (2000–2005), and again in 2007, 2008, and 2010–2014. New Zealand hosts one leg, the New Zealand International Sevens, at Westpac Stadium in Wellington.

== See also ==
- List of New Zealand rugby union teams
