= National Provincial Championship (2006–present) =

New Zealand rugby union competition

- Upcoming season or competition: 2026 Hilux NPC
- Formerly: Air New Zealand Cup (2006–2009); ITM Cup (2010–2015); Mitre 10 Cup (2016–2020); Bunnings NPC (2021-2025)
- Sport: Rugby union
- Founded: October 1975; 51 years ago
- First season: 1976
- Owner: New Zealand Rugby
- CEO: Steve Lancaster
- No. of teams: 14
- Country: New Zealand
- Headquarters: Wellington, New Zealand
- Most recent champion: Canterbury (2026)
- Most titles: Auckland (17 titles)
- Broadcasters: Sky Sport; TVNZ
- Sponsor: Toyota Hilux
- Related competitions: Farah Palmer Cup; Heartland Championship
- Website: provincial.rugby

The National Provincial Championship (NPC) is an annual, men's round-robin rugby union competition organised by New Zealand Rugby. First played in 1976, it is the second highest level of professional rugby in New Zealand. The Ranfurly Shield is also played for during the season. A concurrent women's tournament is also held, called the Farah Palmer Cup.

Since 2026, it has been known as the Hilux National Provincial Championship after Toyota Hilux, its naming rights sponsor.

Following the 2005 season the league was restructured into a two-tier competition. The National Provincial Championship would include professional and semi-professional players, and consist of the top fourteen financial and sporting best performing regional teams. For sponsorship reasons it was rebranded as the Air New Zealand Cup. The remaining teams would form an amateur competition known as the Heartland Championship.

Twenty-nine teams have competed since the inception of the competition in 1976. Auckland are historically the most successful union with seventeen titles and Canterbury is the most successful team during the professional era, having won eleven from thirteen finals. Eight other teams have won titles from both periods: Wellington (6), Waikato (3), Otago (2), Taranaki (2), Tasman (2), Bay of Plenty (1), Counties Manukau (1) and Manawatu (1).

== History ==
=== Origins and foundation ===
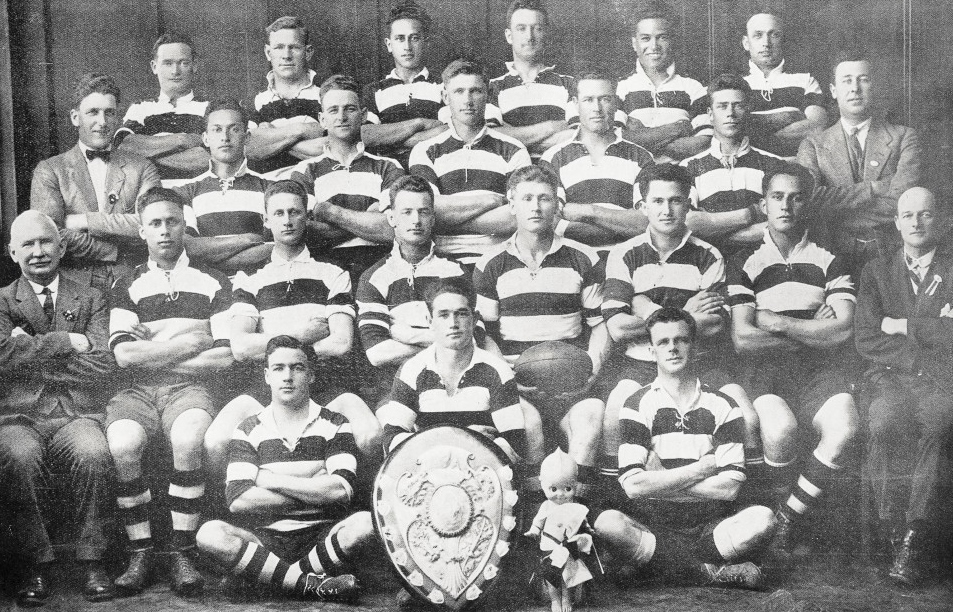
Hawke's Bay occupying the Ranfurly Shield in 1923.

The first form of competition came in 1904 with the introduction of the Ranfurly Shield as a challenge trophy. Each year, fixtures were arranged in Wellington during the annual meeting of the New Zealand Rugby Football Union, where an elected representative from each provincial union would propose dates and opponents that ideally avoided conflicts with local club competitions. Across the country, neighbouring regions organised regular matches for challenge trophies. One of the most prestigious competitions, the Hanan Shield, was established in 1946 by Timaru's former mayor, A.E.S. Hanan, and was contested by Mid Canterbury, South Canterbury, and North Otago. Another significant trophy, the Seddon Shield, was first challenged in 1906. Named after former New Zealand premier Richard Seddon, it featured representative teams from Buller, Nelson Bays, Marlborough, and the West Coast. In the North Island, starting in the King Country and moving north, eleven teams competed for the Coronation Shield.

Given the numerous competitions across New Zealand, there was a clear need for a national tournament. In 1972, Barry Smith proposed an inter-provincial competition to the Auckland Rugby Union. After gaining approval, the proposal was brought to the New Zealand Rugby Football Union's annual conference in early 1974. It included an overview of the scheme, addressing finance, travel, sponsorship opportunities, implications for club and sub-union competitions, traditional representative matches, international laws and Sunday play. Following discussions in October 1975, modifications were made and ultimately accepted by all provinces. Radio New Zealand secured sponsorship rights worth NZD 100,000 and helped market the new competition, later joined by Lion Breweries, National Mutual, and Air New Zealand.

Teams were divided into two divisions based on their performance over the previous five years. The premier division included Auckland, Bay of Plenty, Canterbury, Counties, Hawke's Bay, Manawatu, Marlborough, North Auckland, Otago, Southland, and Wellington, determined by a ranking system. The remaining provinces, Buller, East Coast, Horowhenua, King Country, Mid Canterbury, Nelson Bays, North Otago, Poverty Bay, South Canterbury, Taranaki, Thames Valley, Waikato, Wairarapa Bush, Wanganui and the West Coast were split into North Island and South Island sub-divisions, with the potential for promotion to the top division.

=== Auckland dynasty ===
Between 1980 and the early 2000s, Auckland experienced a golden era, dominating competitions and consistently retaining the Ranfurly Shield. During this time, they reached eighteen finals, finishing as runners-up multiple times, and secured over half of the available competition titles, totaling fifteen. This remarkable run included a record sixty-one Ranfurly Shield defenses, five South Pacific Championship titles, and recognition as the Halberg Awards Team of the Year in 1992.

Canterbury emerged as the only team to consistently challenge Auckland's supremacy, with several matches becoming historic. The 1985 clash, where Auckland ended Canterbury's record-equalling streak of twenty-five matches, was famously dubbed the "Match of the Century." In front of a record crowd of 52,000 at Lancaster Park, Canterbury nearly staged a stunning comeback from a 24–0 half-time deficit, but Auckland held on to win 28–23, setting a new benchmark with sixty-one consecutive defences over eight years.

Auckland's fortunes waned with the professionalisation of rugby, officially declared in August 1995. The introduction of Super 12 in 1996 marked the end of their dominance as many international players became unavailable. Notable stars like Sean Fitzpatrick, who captained the All Blacks and played 154 games for Auckland, and Grant Fox, who set a record for the most shield points (932), were pivotal during this era, along with John Kirwan, who scored forty-four tries.

=== Turning professional ===
After the 2005 season, the league underwent a restructuring to create a two-tier competition. The National Provincial Championship would now feature both professional and semi-professional players, comprising the top fourteen financially viable and high-performing regional teams. For sponsorship purposes, it was rebranded as the Air New Zealand Cup, while the remaining teams formed an amateur competition called the Heartland Championship.

This restructuring followed a review conducted by the New Zealand Rugby Union in November 2003, which prioritised issues related to the professional and amateur provincial games, including timing, costs, and the roles of the NZRU, Super 12 franchises and provincial unions in the sport's management. By December 2005, the final pools and draws for the inaugural Air New Zealand Cup were established, with the season commencing in late July. The fourteen participating teams were Auckland, Bay of Plenty, Canterbury, Counties Manukau, Hawke's Bay, Manawatu, North Harbour, Northland, Otago, Southland, Taranaki, Tasman, Waikato, and Wellington.

The competition format included two pools with a two-round system, followed by a finals series consisting of quarterfinals, semifinals, and a final. Teams competed based on their rankings from the first round, forming a top six pool and a bottom eight repechage in the second round. The top two teams from the repechage joined the top six teams in the quarterfinals. The pools were determined by seedings from the 2005 National Provincial Championship.

Following the inaugural season, the New Zealand Rugby Union held a meeting to evaluate the tournament's success and gather feedback from stakeholders and provincial unions. It was confirmed that the fourteen teams would remain for the 2007 season, though the format would be adjusted. The new structure included seven matches each week during a ten-week modified round robin, followed by quarterfinals, semifinals, and finals. Notably, this modified round robin did not require all teams to compete against one another, as a formula was established to determine which teams would not face each other based on their performance from the previous season.

=== Canterbury dominance ===
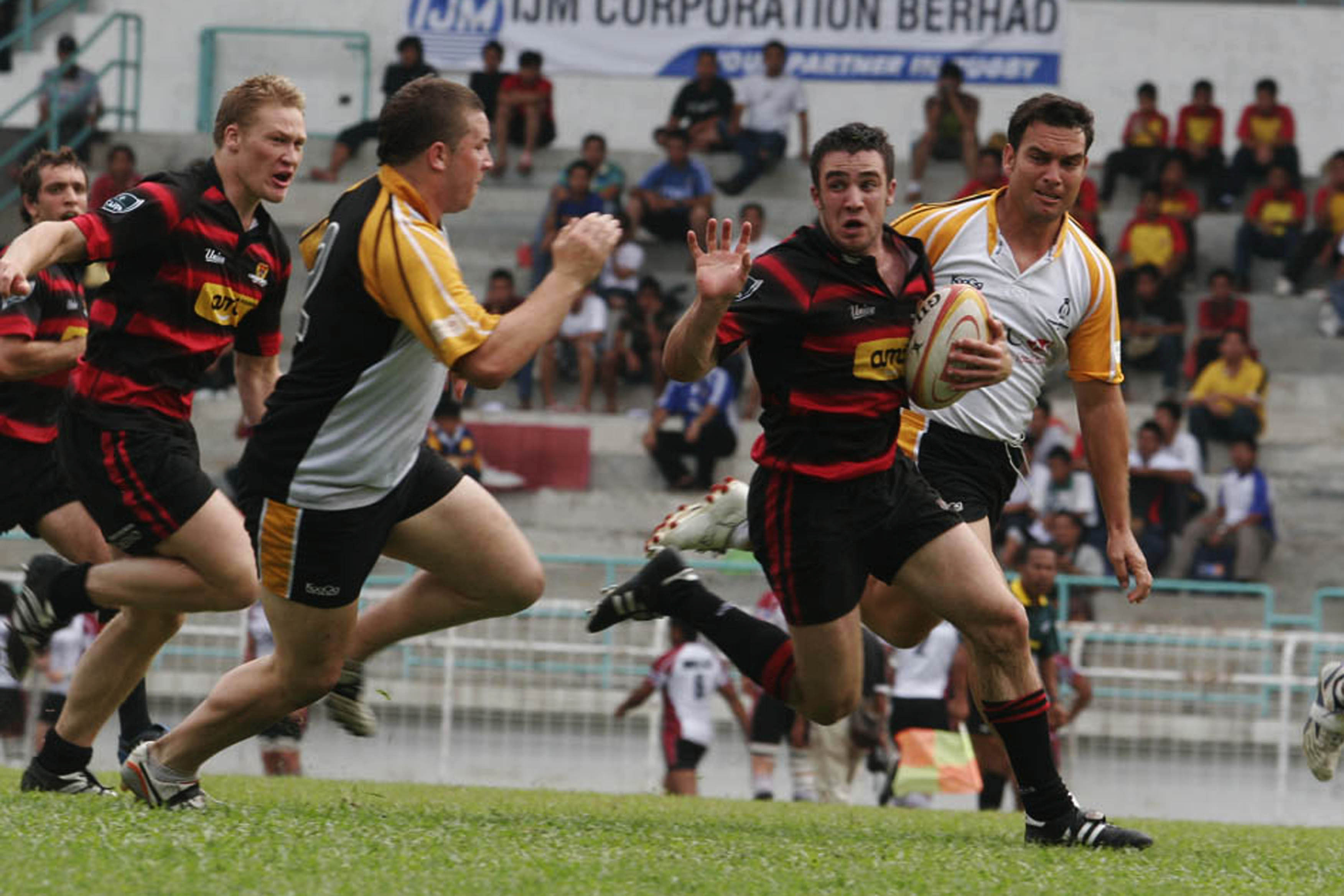
Canterbury competing in the COBRA Rugby Tens in 2008.

Canterbury had a remarkable run in the National Provincial Championship from 2008 to 2018, winning the title nine times and cementing their position as one of New Zealand's premier provincial teams. This success stemmed from a strong focus on player development, with many players going on to represent the All Blacks. The 2008 season marked the beginning of Canterbury's unprecedented dynasty, which continued until their streak was broken by Auckland in the 2018 final. They became the first team to win six consecutive titles after defeating Wellington in 2013 and also retained the Ranfurly Shield three times during this era.

During this period, Canterbury produced over twenty international players, more than any other province in New Zealand. Centurions such as Owen Franks and Sam Whitelock, along with other notable talents like Wyatt Crockett, Sonny Bill Williams, Codie Taylor and Richie Mo'unga, all began their careers with Canterbury. Each of these players made significant contributions to the All Blacks, with many playing over fifty test matches.

Few teams could match Canterbury's dominance until their neighbouring province, Tasman, became competitive and gained promotion in 2013. This led to the end of Canterbury's six-championship winning streak, as Tasman convincingly defeated them in the 2014 semi-final at Trafalgar Park. Ireland international James Lowe and former All Black Jimmy Cowan both scored tries, converted by Marty Banks, securing a memorable 26–6 victory. Canterbury also lost to Tasman during the round-robin phase of that season. The rivalry continued, with the two teams meeting again in the finals of 2016 and 2017, where Canterbury emerged victorious.

=== Renaming and newcomers ===
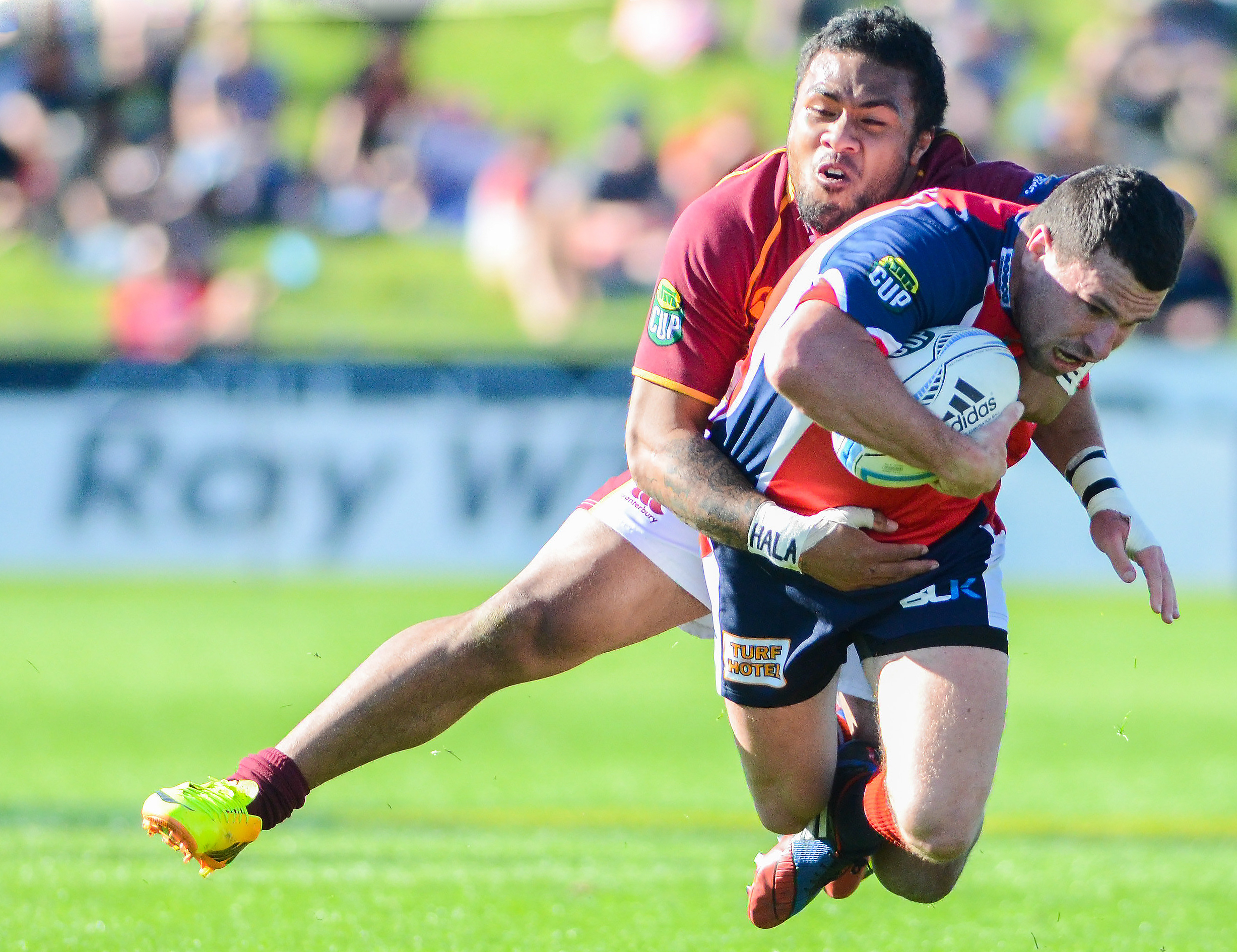
Tasman playing against Southland in 2013.

In April 2021, Bunnings, a hardware and retail store, became the new sponsor of the competition, leading to the name's return to the National Provincial Championship for the first time since the 2005 season. Additionally, the Rugby Cup was reintroduced as the competition's trophy after being replaced by three other trophies between 2006 and 2021. Following a further review by New Zealand Rugby, the competition format was also restructured, allowing fourteen teams to compete for a single title, eliminating the divisions that had been in place since the 2010 season.

Beyond the traditional Super Rugby bases of Auckland, Canterbury, Otago, Waikato and Wellington, only two other provinces have achieved notable success during the professional era, Taranaki and Tasman. Their rise began with their matchup in the 2014 final, where Taranaki claimed their first national title in history with a thrilling 36–32 victory. This marked the first time a provincial union outside the big five had won the premiership title since 1980.

Since then, both teams have secured the title twice, with Taranaki also holding the Ranfurly Shield on two occasions and Tasman winning it for the first time in 2024. During this era, notable All Blacks such as the Barrett brothers, Beauden, Jordie, and New Zealand captain Scott all represented Taranaki, while Tasman boasted talents like Will Jordan, one of the country's leading international try scorers, and Ireland international James Lowe.

== Teams ==
Locations of the 2022 Bunnings NPC teams.

The fourteen provincial unions that have participated in the current National Provincial Championship since its founding in 2006 are listed below. Ten teams are situated in the North Island and four teams in the South Island.

The NPC, which comes after Super Rugby and international rugby, constitutes the "third tier" of rugby union in New Zealand. Below this tier are numerous club competitions, which are organised by each provincial union.

With the creation of two distinct provincial competitions in 2006, thirteen teams, together with the newly established Tasman Rugby Union, remained in the newly restructured competition. The remainder formed an amateur competition called the Heartland Championship. The teams who were chosen to stay were reorganised to play professionally. In order for the area to field a squad for the 2006 season, Tasman was established in December 2005. This became the newest provincial union in New Zealand, having been created through the amalgamation of Nelson Bays and Marlborough Rugby Union.

Another one of New Zealand's newest provincial rugby unions, North Harbour was founded in 1985, which was followed by Tasman. After North Harbour being promoted to the first division in 1987, they entered the National Provincial Championship by taking first place in the third division in its inaugural year. While the former competition received further additional participants such as the Central Vikings, another two unions underwent name changes throughout its time. In 1994, the 1920-founded North Auckland Rugby Union changed its name to Northland. South Auckland Counties was established with full union status in 1955. The following year, the name was abbreviated to Counties, and in 1996 the organisation changed its name to Counties Manukau.

Following a review conducted after the 2007 season, New Zealand Rugby declared Northland and Tasman might be removed from the competition due to widespread support for a smaller Air New Zealand Cup. However, after members unanimously decided to keep the fourteen-team structure, both teams appealed the decision to be eliminated and won their case. But their existence at top level was conditional upon them meeting further requirements. The relationship between the Nelson and Marlborough unions, which broke down the previous year, needed to be repaired and kept together by Tasman. Additionally, they had to persuade the NZR of their financial viability and begin making payments on a loan they had received from the organisation worth NZD 340,000. Furthermore, Northland had to make governance changes that include a new chief executive and the current board had to resign, seeking a re-election.

Team	Union	Established	Location	Venue	Capacity	Head coach
Auckland	Auckland Rugby Union	1883; 143 years ago	Auckland	Eden Park	50,000	Steven Bates
Bay of Plenty	Bay of Plenty Rugby Union	1911; 115 years ago	Tauranga	Tauranga Domain^{[a]}	5,000	Richard Watt
Canterbury	Canterbury Rugby Football Union	1879; 147 years ago	Christchurch	One New Zealand Stadium	25,000	Alex Robertson
Counties Manukau	Counties Manukau Rugby Football Union	1955; 71 years ago	Pukekohe	Navigation Homes Stadium	12,000	Reon Graham
Hawke's Bay	Hawke's Bay Rugby Union	1884; 142 years ago	Napier	McLean Park	19,700	Brock James
Manawatu	Manawatu Rugby Union	1886; 140 years ago	Palmerston North	Central Energy Trust Arena	15,000	Wesley Clarke
North Harbour	North Harbour Rugby Union	1985; 41 years ago	Auckland	North Harbour Stadium	14,000	Jimmy Maher
Northland	Northland Rugby Union	1920; 106 years ago	Whangārei	Semenoff Stadium	18,500	Ryan Martin
Otago	Otago Rugby Football Union	1881; 145 years ago	Dunedin	Forsyth Barr Stadium	30,748	Mark Brown
Southland	Rugby Southland	1887; 139 years ago	Invercargill	Rugby Park Stadium	18,000	Matt Saunders
Taranaki	Taranaki Rugby Football Union	1885; 141 years ago	New Plymouth	Stadium Taranaki	30,000	Neil Barnes
Tasman	Tasman Rugby Union	2006; 20 years ago	Nelson	Trafalgar Park^{[b]}	18,000	Gray Cornelius
Waikato	Waikato Rugby Union	1921; 105 years ago	Hamilton	FMG Stadium Waikato	25,800	Ross Filipo
Wellington	Wellington Rugby Football Union	1879; 147 years ago	Wellington	Hnry Stadium	34,500	Trent Renata

^{a} One of the two home fields used by the Bay of Plenty Rugby Union is the Tauranga Domain. It serves as both their main stadium and training facility, with the Rotorua International Stadium serving as a temporary location for the occasional fixture.
^{b} Home matches for the Tasman Rugby Union alternate between Blenheim and Nelson. Their main training facility is located at Trafalgar Park, where their headquarters is located in the vicinity. An alternative host for games is Lansdowne Park.

== Structure and finances ==
=== Format ===
In December 2005, the final pools and draws for the inaugural Air New Zealand Cup were made. The competition was established as a result of a thorough competitions review conducted by the New Zealand Rugby Union. The season started at the end of July, and fourteen teams participated. Auckland, Bay of Plenty, Canterbury, Counties Manukau, Hawke's Bay, Manawatu, North Harbour, Northland, Otago, Southland, Taranaki, Tasman, Waikato, and Wellington were the teams that were revealed. A two-pool, two-round competition in which the unions participated was followed by a finals round including quarterfinal, semifinal, and final matches. Based on first-round rankings, teams competed in a top-six pool and a bottom-eight repechage in the second round. The top two teams from the repechage joined the top-six teams in the quarterfinals. Pools were based on the seedings at the end of the 2005 National Provincial Championship.

The New Zealand Rugby Union conducted a meeting after the inaugural season to assess how well the tournament went in its first year and to seek formal feedback from its stakeholders and the provincial unions. The meeting's conclusion confirmed that the fourteen teams currently playing would remain for the 2007 season. Later, it was revealed that the format would be altered, with seven matches being played each week during a ten-week modified round robin, followed by quarterfinals, semifinals, and final matches. The modified round robin didn't have all teams playing one another. This was based on a team's performance in competition during the previous season. A formula was established to determine which teams did not play each other.

=== Sponsorship ===

The competition was known as the Air New Zealand Cup from 2006 to 2009. Air New Zealand, the national carrier of New Zealand, held the naming rights during that time. In March 2010, it was announced that New Zealand-owned building suppliers' cooperative ITM would sponsor the tournament from 2010 to 2012. Air New Zealand opted to give up their sponsorship rights in order to concentrate their efforts on helping the New Zealand national men's team.

ITM continued owning sponsorship naming rights until another bidder beat them for the 2016 season. The Heartland Championship was also backed by the business. It was referred to as the ITM Cup during its existence. However, they wished to extend their sponsorship once their agreement expired in 2015. ITM submitted a bid, however the New Zealand Rugby Union informed them that it had not been accepted. ITM was not given the opportunity to match the new sponsor's investment, and no explanation as to why it was overlooked for both competitions the following year.

New Zealand owned home improvement and garden retailer, Mitre 10 took over sponsorship in 2016 after they were announced the new title sponsor for the national domestic rugby union competition. With the inclusion of the Farah Palmer Cup, and support of the Jock Hobbs Memorial National Under-19 tournament, Mitre 10 became the first sponsor of all major fifteens domestic rugby competitions in New Zealand.

Bunnings assumed sponsorship of the tournament prior to the 2021 season, changing the competition's name back to the National Provincial Championship. The Bunnings NPC would be the official name of the competition until the end of the 2025 season. Additionally, Bunnings would support the Heartland Championship, Super Rugby Aotearoa Under-20 competition and the Farah Palmer Cup.

In March 2024, the NPC signed a 4-year sponsorship deal with insurance firm Gallagher as an "official national partner" which sees their logo displayed on team jerseys, in stadiums and during televised matches.

Following Bunnings' exit from title sponsorship in late 2025, Toyota took over sponsorship rights for the NPC, Farah Palmer Cup and Heartland Championship, advertising their Hilux brand. The championships were subsequently renamed the Hilux NPC, Farah Palmer Cup presented by Hilux and the Hilux Heartland Championship. This began from the start of the 2026 Season.

=== Salary cap ===
The preliminary determination on a proposed salary cap from the Commerce Commission was made public in March 2006, according to the New Zealand Rugby Union. The organisation declared that it was confident that the pay cap restrictions would bring benefits to the public that would offset any reduction in competition. This was contingent upon the pay cap being strong and strictly enforced. The hiring of Craig Neil and Cameron Good to the positions of manager and advisor for the salary cap was later confirmed by Steve Tew. Along with the announcement, it was stated that each of the fourteen teams was permitted to spend up to two million NZD annually on player salaries and other benefits.

The Commerce Commission was considering overturning its ruling that allowed the New Zealand Rugby Union to impose player movement restrictions and a salary cap. The NZRU modified its employment policies between the 2006 and 2011 seasons, classifying all players as employees rather than independent contractors. Since all of the professional athletes were employed, the Commerce Act did not apply and there was no violation of the Act's anti-competitive provisions. As a result, the Commission thought about overturning its judgement.

Information about player salaries and the salary limit was made public in 2015. It was revealed that no matter if a player participates in a single game or not, the minimum worth of any contract is NZD 18,000 and that sum counts towards the salary cap. No union can spend more than a little over one million on salaries. Any individual contract cannot be worth more than NZD 55,000 per season. The NZRU pays provincial unions $50,000 for each contracted New Zealand international they have on file that participates in a World Cup. The union is required to reimburse the NZRU a pro rata sum if that player becomes available for any reason in order to have access to that athlete. Internationals who are unable to play because of test obligations are not subject to the salary cap.

== Champions ==
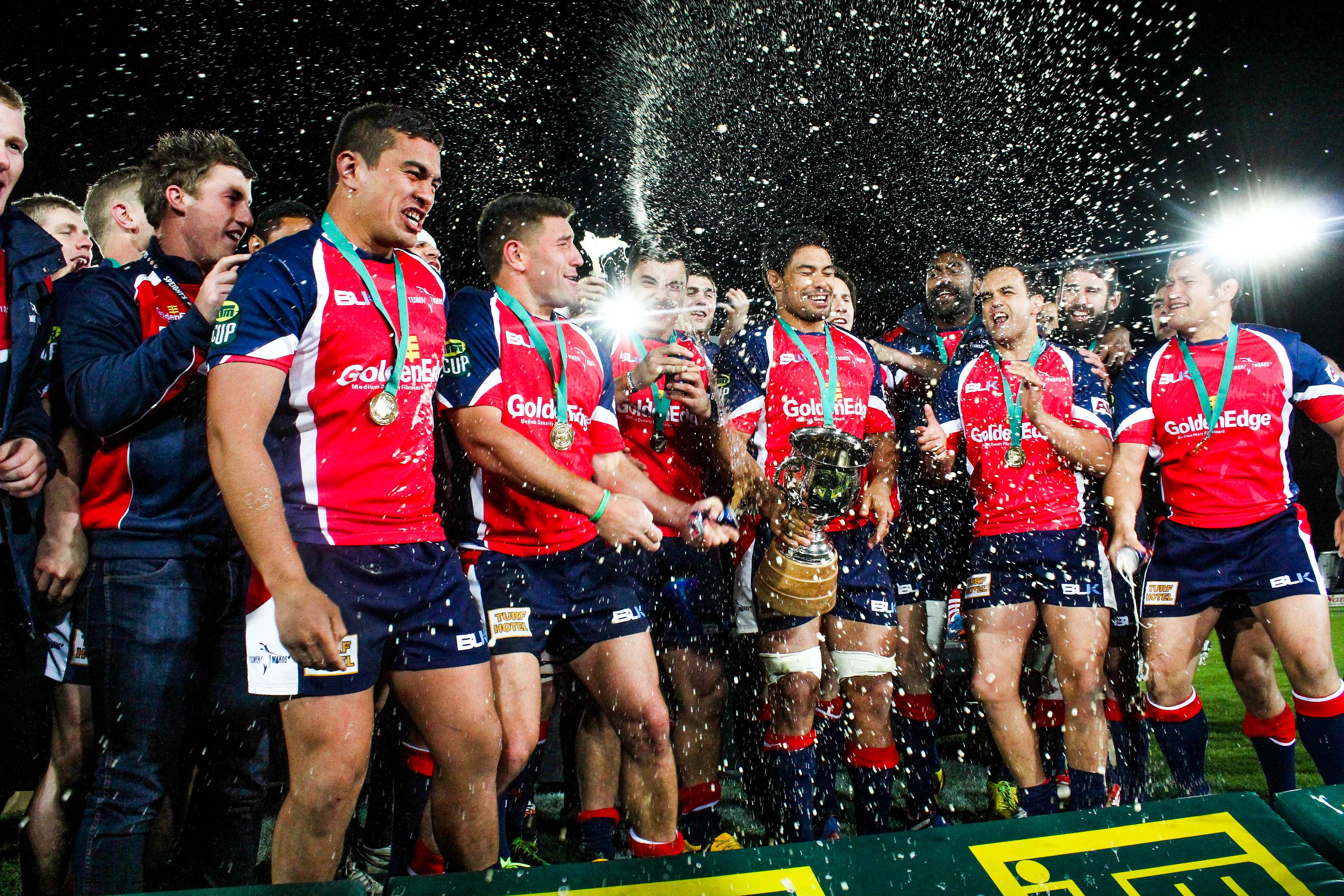
Tasman gaining promotion in 2013.

The winner of the National Provincial Championship final match is awarded the NPC Trophy. The semi-final victor with the highest seed receives home field advantage and hosts the NPC final. In 2006, Waikato defeated Wellington to become the first province to win the competition following its reorganisation after the 2005 season.

Prior to the tournament undergoing a redesign in 2006, the previous competition was split into three divisions, with promotion and relegation between the divisions. The promotion and relegation structure was reintroduced in 2011 (between the Premiership and Championship) until being removed after the 2021 season. The winner of the Premiership was crowned the competition's champion, whereas the winner of the Championship was elevated to the Premiership in order to compete for the title. Nine teams were promoted over this time. Bay of Plenty, Counties Manukau, Manawatu, North Harbour, Taranaki, Tasman, Waikato and Wellington had once all received promotion, whereas Hawke's Bay had been promoted on three different occasions.

With eleven titles, Canterbury leads all other teams in final victories; Auckland, Tasman, Taranaki, Waikato and Wellington each have two. The most final appearances of thirteen and most consecutive appearances with six in a row from 2008 to 2013 belong to Canterbury. From 2006 to 2009, Wellington was the only other team to make at least four straight appearances. Wellington has also lost a record number of six finals compared to Tasman's four, Auckland's three, Waikato's two and Canterbury's two. The only union with a flawless record is Taranaki, which won their two finals appearance in 2014 and 2023.

Edition	Year	Champion	Result	Runner-up	Venue	Location	Winning coach	Ref.
1	2006	Waikato	37–31	Wellington	Waikato Stadium	Hamilton	Warren Gatland	
2	2007	Auckland	23–14	Wellington	Eden Park	Auckland	Pat Lam	
3	2008	Canterbury	7–6	Wellington	Westpac Stadium	Wellington	Rob Penney	
4	2009	Canterbury	28–20	Wellington	AMI Stadium	Christchurch	Rob Penney	
5	2010	Canterbury	33–13	Waikato	AMI Stadium	Christchurch	Rob Penney	
6	2011	Canterbury	12–3	Waikato	AMI Stadium	Christchurch	Rob Penney	
7	2012	Canterbury	31–18	Auckland	AMI Stadium	Christchurch	Tabai Matson	
8	2013	Canterbury	29–13	Wellington	Westpac Stadium	Wellington	Scott Robertson	
9	2014	Taranaki	36–32	Tasman	Yarrow Stadium	New Plymouth	Colin Cooper	
10	2015	Canterbury	25–23	Auckland	AMI Stadium	Christchurch	Scott Robertson	
11	2016	Canterbury	43–27	Tasman	AMI Stadium	Christchurch	Scott Robertson	
12	2017	Canterbury	35–13	Tasman	AMI Stadium	Christchurch	Glenn Delaney	
13	2018	Auckland	40–33	Canterbury	Eden Park	Auckland	Alama Ieremia	
14	2019	Tasman	31–14	Wellington	Trafalgar Park	Nelson	Andrew Goodman and Clarke Dermody	
15	2020	Tasman	13–12	Auckland	Eden Park	Auckland	Andrew Goodman and Clarke Dermody	
16	2021	Waikato	23–20	Tasman	FMG Stadium Waikato	Hamilton	Ross Filipo	
17	2022	Wellington	26–18	Canterbury	Orangetheory Stadium	Christchurch	Leo Crowley	
18	2023	Taranaki	22–19	Hawke's Bay	Yarrow Stadium	New Plymouth	Neil Barnes	
19	2024	Wellington	23–20	Bay of Plenty	Sky Stadium	Wellington	Alando Soakai	
20	2025	Canterbury	36–28	Otago	Apollo Projects Stadium	Christchurch	Marty Bourke	
21	2026	Canterbury	43–24	Northland	One NZ Stadium	Christchurch	Alex Robertson	

=== Finals appearances by union ===
In the sortable table below, teams are ordered first by number of appearances, then by number of wins, and finally by season of first appearance.

Team	Total	First	Latest	Won	Lost	Win %
Canterbury	13	2008	2026	11	2	84.62
Wellington	8	2006	2024	2	6	25.00
Tasman	6	2014	2021	2	4	33.33
Auckland	5	2007	2020	2	3	40.00
Waikato	4	2006	2021	2	2	50.00
Taranaki	2	2014	2023	2	0	100.00
Hawke's Bay	1	2023	2023	0	1	0.00
Bay of Plenty	1	2024	2024	0	1	0.00
Otago	1	2025	2025	0	1	0.00
Northland	1	2026	2026	0	1	0.00

=== Second-tier champions ===
For the 2011 season, three midweek games were agreed upon by all provincial teams in a one-off arrangement to accommodate an expanded Super 15 and the Rugby World Cup. The entire competition would be played over eight weeks, reduced from twelve. The final was held the week before the World Cup began; there were no semifinals. This was necessary because, according to IRB regulations, the World Cup host was required to cease all domestic rugby action a fortnight or more before the beginning of the competition in order to give all venues enough time to display their sponsors' logos. The brand-new two division format was introduced at this time. Those placed from first to seventh made up the Premiership after the 2010 ITM Cup, and teams ranked eighth to fourteenth made up the Championship. Each team would play four crossover games in addition to every other team in their division.

The Premiership and Championship division structures were removed after the 2021 season, returning all fourteen teams to compete for a single title. This was partly because teams had requested a change to the current structure and desired that every side have the opportunity to compete for the championship. Andrew Thompson, the chairman of the Taranaki Rugby Football Union board, collaborated with the other provinces to provide a new format to the NZR.

Only two teams, Auckland and Canterbury, have never competed in the Championship tier. Northland and Otago, on the other hand, have only participated in the Championship. Only one side, Hawke's Bay, has won the Championship more than once, their 2020 victory adding to their 2011 and 2015 successes. Of the twelve teams that have participated in the Championship, there have been eight different winners. With the exception of Taranaki in its final season, no Championship team has ever won each of its four crossover matches in a single season.

Year	Champion	Winning coach	Ref.
2011	Hawke's Bay	Peter Russell	
2012	Counties Manukau	Tana Umaga	
2013	Tasman	Kieran Keane	
2014	Manawatu	Jason O'Halloran	
2015	Hawke's Bay	Craig Philpott	
2016	North Harbour	Steve Jackson	
2017	Wellington	Chris Gibbes	
2018	Waikato	Jono Gibbes	
2019	Bay of Plenty	Clayton McMillan	
2020	Hawke's Bay	Mark Ozich	
2021	Taranaki	Neil Barnes	

== Honours ==
The inaugural trophy was first displayed at the tournaments' launch at Auckland's Mt Smart Stadium in July 2006. It was also stated that it would be on display for the general public to witness during the competition's opening game, which was played in Napier between Hawke's Bay and Canterbury. Thorkild Hansen, the son of Jens Hoyer Hansen, crafted the trophy by hand. Black basalt from the Bombay Hills was used to create the polished stone base by Waihi stone carver Jeff Beckwith. The 45-centimeter-tall cup was constructed of 2.7 kilograms of sterling silver and weighed 3.9 kilograms.

=== Ranfurly Shield ===
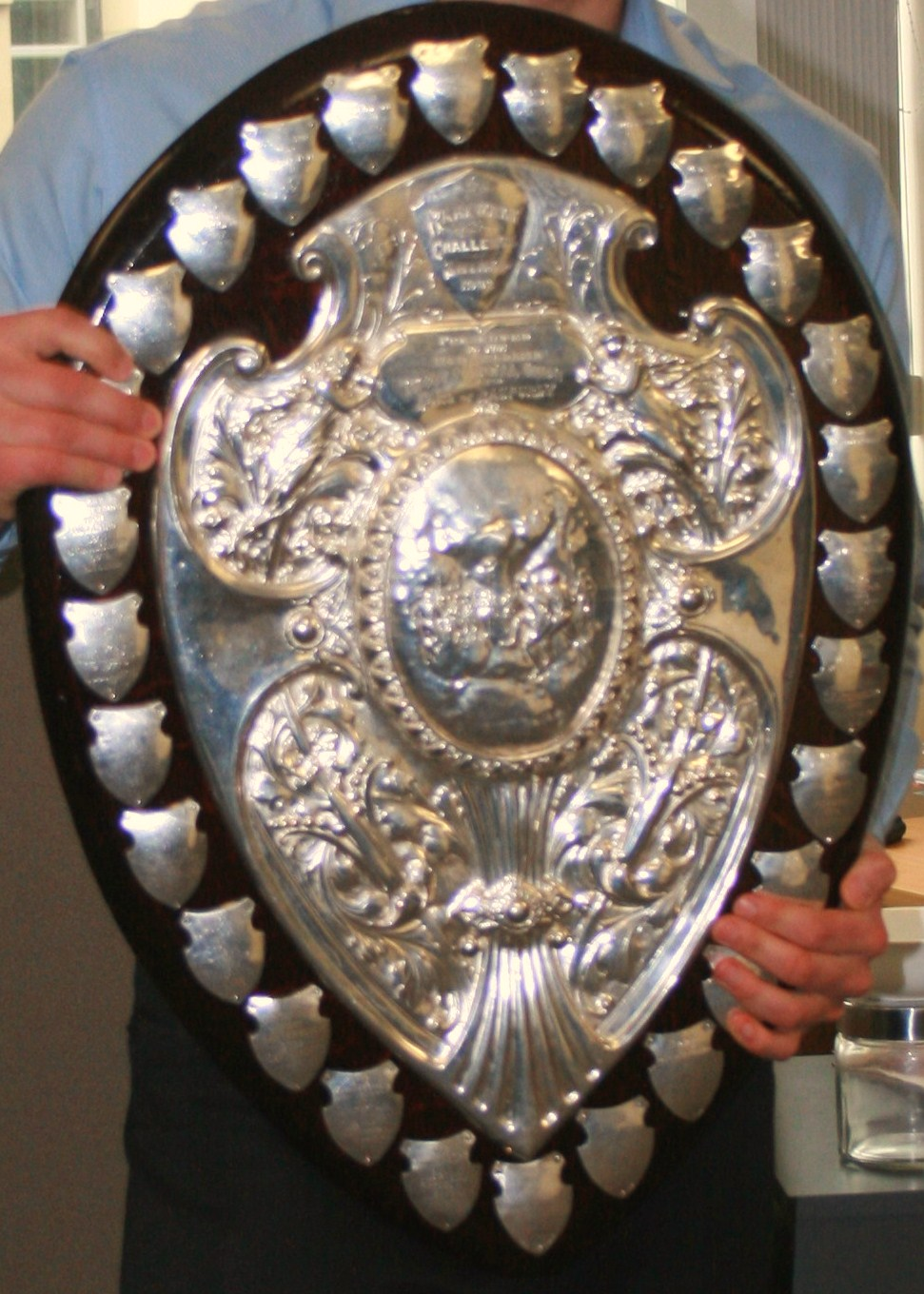

The Ranfurly Shield, colloquially known as the Log o' Wood, is perhaps the most prestigious trophy in New Zealand's domestic rugby union competition. First presented to Auckland in 1902, the Shield is based on a challenge system, rather than a league or knockout competition as with most football trophies. The holding union must defend the Shield in challenge matches, and a successful challenger becomes the new holder of the Shield. The Shield holder at the end of each season is required to accept at least seven challenges for the following year. All home games during the regular season, but not during knockout playoffs, in the NPC or Heartland Championship are automatic challenges. The remaining Shield defences must be made up of challenges from unions in the other domestic competition. For example, since North Harbour, an Air New Zealand Cup team, held the Shield at the end of the 2006 season despite losing their home quarter-final to Otago, they were forced to defend the Shield against two Heartland Championship teams during the 2007 pre-season, since they had only five home games scheduled in the 2007 Air New Zealand Cup regular season, which they did against Thames Valley and Horowhenua Kapiti. Having successfully done so, all their home fixtures in the round-robin phase were Shield defences until they lost the shield to Waikato. The Shield continues to change hands throughout the regular season; to continue the 2007 example, the week after gaining the Shield from North Harbour, Otago lost at home to Canterbury, who held the Shield until losing at home in the final week of the regular season to Auckland; hence, at the end of the 2007 season, Auckland held the Shield. The Shield is currently held by Counties Manukau, who won it from Northland in a 22–19 victory on 26 September 2026.

=== Inter-union trophies ===
Trophy	Inaugurated	Season	Holder	Challenger	Ref
Brian Purdy Battle of the Bridge Memorial Trophy	2002; 24 years ago	2026	North Harbour	Auckland	
Bruce Robertson Trophy	2024; 2 years ago	2025	Northland	Auckland, Counties Manukau, Hawke's Bay	
Chiefs Country Cup	2018; 8 years ago	2026	Waikato	Bay of Plenty, Counties Manukau, Taranaki	
Coronation Cup	1953; 73 years ago	2025	Manawatu	Wellington	
Donald Stuart Memorial Shield	1853; 173 years ago	2025	Otago	Southland	
Fred Lucas Memorial Trophy	—	2026	Auckland	Wellington	
Harry Saundercock Memorial Trophy	1965; 61 years ago	2025	Canterbury	Wellington	
Heta (Peter) Te Tai Trophy	2022; 4 years ago	2025	Northland	Southland	
John Drake Boot Memorial Trophy	2009; 17 years ago	2024	Bay of Plenty	Auckland	
John F. Henning Trophy	1967; 59 years ago	2025	Taranaki	Wellington	
Jonah Tali Lomu Memorial Trophy	2016; 10 years ago	2024	Counties Manukau	Wellington	
Kel Tremain Memorial Trophy	1993; 33 years ago	2016	Hawke's Bay	Manawatu	
Kevin Gimblett Memorial Trophy	2005; 21 years ago	2015	Canterbury	North Harbour	
Lindsay Colling Memorial Trophy	2005; 21 years ago	2024	Otago	Auckland	
Lion Red Challenge Cup	–	2024	Counties Manukau	North Harbour	
MacRae-Shelford Bay Cup	2017; 9 years ago	2025	Hawke's Bay	Bay of Plenty	
Nathan Strongman Memorial Trophy	2022; 4 years ago	2026	Waikato	Bay of Plenty	
Newstalk ZB Trans Harbour Trophy	1986; 40 years ago	2026	North Harbour	Auckland	
Payne Trophy	1922; 104 years ago	2026	Canterbury	Otago	
Peter Burke Trophy	2012; 14 years ago	2022	Bay of Plenty	Taranaki	
Ryan Wheeler Memorial Trophy	2001; 25 years ago	2025	Waikato	Taranaki	
Stan Thomas Memorial Trophy	1975; 51 years ago	2022	Waikato	Auckland	
Supporters' Club Cup	—	2024	Canterbury	Auckland	

=== Player awards ===
The Duane Monkley medal, named in honour of the legendary Waikato player who played 135 games for the province between 1987 and 1996, was unveiled by New Zealand Rugby in 2017. The player of the year award is decided by a season-points system. Match officials choose their players of the match and award three points, two points, and one point for the game's top three performers. Prior to 2017, it was simply given to the best player during the season and was selected by a committee of committee members, retired players and media representatives.

Season	Player	Position	Team	Ref
2006	Richard Kahui	Centre	Waikato	
2007	Isa Nacewa	Centre	Auckland	
2008	Jamie Mackintosh	Prop	Southland	
2009	Mike Delany	First five-eighth	Bay of Plenty	
2010	Robbie Fruean	Centre	Canterbury	
2011	Aaron Cruden	First five-eighth	Manawatu	
2012	Robbie Fruean	Centre	Canterbury	
2013	Andrew Ellis	Half-back	Canterbury	
2014	Seta Tamanivalu	Centre	Taranaki	
2015	George Moala	Centre	Auckland	
2016	Jordie Barrett	Fullback	Canterbury	
2017	Jack Goodhue	Centre	Northland	
2018	Luke Romano	Lock	Canterbury	
2019	Chase Tiatia	Fullback	Bay of Plenty	
2020	Folau Fakatava	Half-back	Hawke's Bay	
2021	Stephen Perofeta	Fullback	Taranaki	
2022	Bryn Gatland	First five-eighth	North Harbour	
2023	Etene Nanai-Seturo	Wing	Counties Manukau	
2024	Timoci Tavatavanawai	Wing	Tasman	
2025	Josh Jacomb	First five-eighth	Taranaki	

== See also ==
- Rugby union in New Zealand
- History of rugby union in New Zealand
- List of New Zealand rugby union teams
- Heartland Championship
- National Provincial Championship (1976–2005)
- Ranfurly Shield
- Farah Palmer Cup
