= South Auckland Rugby Union (1926–1955) =

South Auckland
Club information
- Full name: South Auckland Rugby Union
- Colours: Red, Black and White
- Founded: 1926

The South Auckland Rugby Union was a governing body for Rugby Union in the area south of Auckland and north of Waikato from 1926 until 1955.

== History ==
The South Auckland union (the second union by that name) was founded in 1926 by amalgamating several clubs and sub-unions in the South Auckland area which had been affiliated with the Auckland Rugby Union to that stage. It lasted until 1955 when it became a full union and was renamed as "South Auckland Counties", later as the Counties Rugby Football Union (shortened to "Counties") in 1956.
