= South Auckland Rugby Union (1909–1921) =

South Auckland
Club information
- Full name: South Auckland Rugby Union
- Colours: Blue and Black
- Founded: 1909

The South Auckland Rugby Union was a governing body for Rugby Union in the area south of Auckland from 1909 until 1921.

== History ==
The Union was founded at Te Aroha on 8 May 1909 through amalgamating several clubs and organisations in the southern part of the Auckland Province that were previously affiliated to the Auckland Rugby Union as sub-unions. The union also included Rotorua, Ōpōtiki, Whakatāne, Te Puke, Tauranga, and Taupō until April 1911 when they cumulatively split to form the Bay of Plenty Rugby Union. The remaining unions in the area continued as South Auckland until the team title was changed in 1921 to the Waikato Rugby Union instead. The remaining South Auckland area that did not join the new Waikato Union formed their own unions; King Country and Thames Valley respectively.

After 1921 the now separate unions would occasionally play together as "South Auckland" against touring sides, such as against New South Wales during their 1923 tour.

== Ranfurly Shield ==
South Auckland never held the Ranfurly Shield. They were beaten 21-5 by Auckland in their sole shield challenge in August 1911.

23 August 1911	Auckland	21–5	South Auckland	Alexandra Park, Auckland
	Try: Dougie McGregor (2), R.B. Magee, Harold Hayward, James Stewart, T.M. Wilkes; Pen: Joe O'Leary		Try: S.Darby; Con: A. Hyde	Referee: C.W. Oram (Auckland)
