= George Tod =

George Tod may refer to:

- George Tod (surveyor), British surveyor and hothouse builder
- George Tod (judge) (1773–1841), American politician, jurist and soldier
- George Tod (footballer) (1880–1930), Scottish footballer

== See also ==
- George Todd (disambiguation)
