= Tod (given name) =

Tod is a given name. Notable persons with that name include:

== Given name ==
- Tod Ashley (born 1965), American singer-songwriter
- Tod Bowman (born 1965), American legislator from Iowa
- Tod Scott Brody (1956–2015), American film producer, editor, and photographer
- Tod Brown (1936–2023), American Roman Catholic bishop
- Tod Brown (baseball) (born 1971), American baseball coach
- Tod Bunting (born 1958), American Adjutant General of Kansas
- Tod Robinson Caldwell (1818–1874), American lawyer and governor of North Carolina
- Tod Carroll, American writer and film producer
- Tod Carter, American animation director
- Tod Davies (born 1955), American writer and publisher
- Tod Dockstader (1932–2015), American composer of electronic music
- Tod Ensign (died 2014), American veteran's rights lawyer
- Tod Fennell (born 1984), Canadian actor
- Tod Frye, American computer game programmer
- Tod Goldberg (born 1971), American mystery author
- Tod Gordon (born 1955), American wrestling promoter
- Tod Hanson (born 1963), British painter and graphic artist
- Tod Hartje (born 1968), American ice hockey center
- Tod Howarth (born 1957), American guitarist
- Tod Johnston, Australian radio and television host
- Tod Kowalczyk (born 1966), American basketball coach
- Tod R. Lauer (born 1957), American astronomer
- Tod Leiweke (born 1960), American sports executive
- Tod Lending, American film producer and director
- Tod Lindberg, American political expert
- Tod Long (born 1970), American sprinter
- Tod Machover (born 1953), American composer
- Tod McBride (born 1976), American football cornerback
- Tod H. Mikuriya (1933–2007), American psychiatrist and medical cannabis advocate
- Tod Murphy (born 1963), American college basketball coach and former National Basketball Association player
- Tod Ohnstad (born 1952), American labor union official and assemblyman
- Tod Papageorge (born 1940), American photographer
- Tod Sacerdoti, American businessperson
- Tod Strike, Australian actor and singer
- Tod Williams (born 1943), American architect, of Tod Williams Billie Tsien Architects
- Tod Williams (filmmaker) (born 1968), American film director (and son of the architect)
- Tod D. Wolters (born 1960), American United States Air Force general

== Nickname ==
- Tod Brynan (1863–1925), American baseball player
- Tod Campeau (1923–2009), Canadian ice hockey player
- Tod Collins (1874–1932), Australian rules football player
- Tod Davis (1924–1978), American baseball player
- Tod Dennehey (1899–1977), American baseball player
- Tod Eberle (1886–1967), American football and basketball coach
- Tod Goodwin (1911–1997), American football player
- Tod Rockwell (1900–1952), American football player and coach
- Tod Sloan (baseball) (1890–1956), American baseball player
- Tod Sloan (ice hockey) (1927–2017), Canadian ice hockey player
- Tod Sloan (jockey) (1874–1933), American jockey
- Tod Sweeney (1919–2001), British Army officer

== Fictional characters ==
- Tod Hackett, protagonist of the 1939 novel The Day of the Locust
- Tod Stiles, a character on the television show Route 66
- Tod, a boy in Tod of the Fens, Elinor Whitney Field's 1928 children's novel
- Tod, a red fox from The Fox and the Hound
- Tod Waggner, played by Chad Donella in the 2000 movie Final Destination

== See also ==
- Tod (disambiguation)
- Tod (surname)
- Tó, nicknames
- Ton (given name)
- Todd (given name)
