= Tod =

Tod or TOD may refer to:

== People and fictional characters ==
- Tod (given name), a list of people and fictional characters with the given name or nickname
- Tod (surname), a list of people and a fictional character with the name
- Tod Andrews, American actor Theodore Edwin Anderson (1914–1972)
- Tod Browning, stage name of American film director, film actor, screenwriter, vaudeville performer and carnival sideshow and circus entertainer Charles Albert Browning Jr. (1880–1962)
- Tod Morgan, American boxer Albert Morgan Pilkington (1902–1953)
- Tod Robbins, a pen name of American mystery and horror author Clarence Aaron Robbins (1888–1949)
- Tod Slaughter, stage name of English actor Norman Carter Slaughter (1885–1956)
- ToD, French former professional Warcraft III and Starcraft II player Yoan Merlo (born 1985)
- Tod., taxonomic author abbreviation of Agostino Todaro (1818–1892), Italian botanist

== Places ==
- El-Tod, Egyptian City and Archeological Site
- Mount Tod, near British Columbia, Canada
- Mount Tod (Antarctica), near Amundsen Bay
- Tod, informal name for Todmorden, a town in Yorkshire, England
- Tod Creek, a locality within the Municipal District of Pincher Creek No. 9 in Alberta, Canada
- Tod Reservoir, Eyre Peninsula, South Australia
- Tod River, Eyre Peninsula, South Australia

== Transportation codes ==
- Tioman Airport IATA airport code
- Todmorden railway station, West Yorkshire, England, National Rail station code

== TOD ==
- Top of descent, an aviation term
- Torque-on-Demand, trade name for a vehicle four wheel drive system
- Total Overdose, a 2005 video game
- CZW Tournament of Death, annual professional wrestling event
- Transit-oriented development, a form of land use planning
- Foresters' Association of Turkey (Türkiye Ormancılar Derneği)
- Transfer on death, a financial account designation for estate planning

== Other uses ==
- TOD (video format), a digital video format by JVC
- Tod, a male fox
- Tod (unit), an English unit of weight

== See also ==
- Tod's, an Italian company which produces luxury shoes and other leather goods
- El-Tod, a village and archaeological site in Egypt
- Todd (disambiguation)
