= Tod (surname) =

Tod is a surname. Notable people with the surname include:

== People ==
- Andy Tod (born 1971), Scottish footballer
- Archibald Tod (584–1656), Scottish landowner, twice Provost of Edinburgh
- David Tod (1805–1868), American politician and industrialist
- George Tod (surveyor), British surveyor and hothouse builder
- George Tod (judge) (1773—1841), American politician and judge
- George Tod (footballer) (1880–1930), Scottish footballer
- Isabella Tod (1836–1896), Scottish suffragist
- James Tod (1782–1835), British colonial officer and political agent
- James Tod of Deanston (1795–1858), Scottish lawyer and landowner
- James Tod (seigneur) (c.1742–1816), Canadian seigneur
- Joanne Tod (born 1953), Canadian lecturer and painter
- Jodi Tod (born 1981), New Zealand netball player
- John Tod (1779–1830), American politician
- Sir Jonathan Tod (1939–2025), British Royal Navy officer
- Malcolm Tod (1897—1968), British actor
- Quentin Tod (1884—1947), British actor and dancer
- Ronnie Tod (1905–1975), British Army officer

== Fictional characters ==
- the title character of The Tale of Mr. Tod, a children's book written and illustrated by Beatrix Potter

== See also ==
- Senator Tod (disambiguation)
