= Sacerdoti =

Sacerdoti is an Italian surname. Notable people with the surname include:

- Jonathan Sacerdoti, British journalist
- Piero Sacerdoti (1905–1966), Italian insurer and university professor, general manager of Riunione Adriatica di Sicurtà
- Tod Sacerdoti
