= ControlTrac =

Brand name

ControlTrac four-wheel drive is the brand name of a selectable automatic full-time four-wheel drive system offered by Ford Motor Company. The four-wheel drive system was designed and developed at BorgWarner under its TorqTransfer Systems division in the mid 1980s. BorgWarner calls the system Torque-On-Demand (TOD). ControlTrac was the first automatic system to use software control and no planetary or bevel geared center differential. Instead of a planetary or bevel geared center differential, the system uses a variable intelligent locking center multi-disc differential.

== Availability ==
ControlTrac made its debut on January 12, 1995, for the 1995 model year on the second generation Ford Explorer mid-size sport utility vehicle. A heavy-duty version of ControlTrac was introduced in 1996 for the 1997 model year on the first generation Ford Expedition full-size sport utility vehicle.

Vehicles available with automatic ControlTrac four-wheel drive
Vehicle	Model Year	Transfer case
Ford Explorer	MY1995–2010	two-speed
Ford Expedition	MY1997–present	two-speed
Ford Expedition EL/Max	MY2007–present	two-speed
Lincoln Navigator/L	MY1998–2006, 2018-Present	two-speed
Lincoln Navigator	MY2007–present	single-speed*
Lincoln Navigator L	MY2007–present	single-speed*

*Does not have Four Low mode with low range off road reduction gearing.

The fifth generation 2011 Ford Explorer (U502) replaced automatic ControlTrac four-wheel drive with automatic Intelligent four-wheel drive and Terrain Management.

== Design and development ==
The idea for an electronically controlled four-wheel drive system emerged at BorgWarner in 1985. BorgWarner's original design called for using both a software controlled electromagnetic multi-disc (also called multi-plate) clutch pack and a planetary or bevel geared center differential together. The first prototype system was crude, and its original clutch pack controller was a rheostat.

The geared center differential would be used to allow the front and rear drive shafts to turn at different rotational speeds so as to eliminate any "drivetrain binding" or "torque windup" while the system was being used on pavement. The intelligent multi-disc clutch would be used to progressively transfer torque back-to-front and front-to-back between the front and rear drive shafts when needed and would also lockup providing a permanently locked front 50:50 rear torque distribution.

Within a year, the controller had become larger and more complex. A breadboard electronic version complete with sensor amplifiers and large control modules consumed the entire back end of a station wagon. Input data came from variable reluctance sensors installed at the front drive shaft, rear drive shaft, throttle, brakes, and steering. The goal was to control clutch actuation by controlling current.

However, as the development process continued, engineers at BorgWarner discovered that, with clever software programming, they could control the variable electromagnetic multi-disc clutch to a point where it would allow the front and rear drive shafts to turn at different rotational speeds on its own, without the aid of a planetary or bevel geared center differential. In Auto mode the new software algorithms allowed the multi-disc clutch pack's friction and clutch discs to slip as needed, simulating a planetary or bevel geared center differential, making a geared differential redundant. Thus, the geared differential was abandoned and therefore never included on the final production version of the four-wheel drive system.

We asked ourselves: Why do we need a differential? There was all of that iron, all that weight, all that cost. And here, we saw that we could control the clutch pack very precisely without it.

— Ronald A. Schoenbach

The design team gained confidence in their concept in 1989, when they made a breakthrough in the multi-disc clutch's control system. Development of closed-loop control smoothed its operation. Using it, the multi-disc clutch made smaller adjustments, but did it more frequently. The microprocessor would review input from sensors every 20 milliseconds and decide if the front axle needed more torque. Using this technique, the unit's computer watched for drive wheel slip. If it sensed as little as half an rpm difference between the front and rear axles, it sent a power signal to the multi-disc clutch. The clutch engaged, diverting torque to the front axle in 10 percent increments, until it alleviated the drive wheel slip. As a result, the system could control runaway drive wheel speed in as little as a third of a wheel revolution.

== Off road testing ==
Early in the development, BorgWarner had employed a sintered bronze clutch material that exhibited an operating condition commonly known as "stick slip." The slippage had inspired engineers to replace it with a paper-based material mounted atop metal. The paper offered a better coefficient of friction and solved the slippage problem. BorgWarner's automatic transmission components division is credited for the solution.

However, heat proved to be a persistent issue. Excessive heat buildup would burn out the new clutch material. To solve the problem, engineers studied the clutch's torque capacity. It was determined that excessive heat buildup was caused by inadequate clutch torque capacity. Engineers increased the system's capacity and equipped a fleet of test vehicles, which they took to the Anza-Borrego desert in southern California. They made a total of 11 trips, subjecting the prototypes to heat, mountain driving, and deep sand with the intelligent multi-disc clutches being called upon for almost continuous delivery of torque. At first, the environment quickly burned out the clutches. But as engineers gained knowledge, the clutches improved. Eventually, the engineers were able to improve the clutch packs enough that the test vehicles could be virtually destroyed from hard off-road use, but the clutch packs would still look good.

== Modes ==
ControlTrac has different drive modes as well as different operational behavior for those drive modes depending on which vehicle it is used in. For example, the Ford Expedition used a new auto lock feature in Auto mode. Auto mode with auto lock was not available on the Explorer at that time.

=== Two High mode ===
Predominantly, Explorer was not equipped with Two High mode except in the 1995-1996 model years. In model years 1998-up no Two High was available. Only Auto, Four High and Four Low modes were offered. Two High mode was unique to the Expedition, though it was discontinued between the 1999–2002 model years. Two High mode was reintroduced on the redesigned second generation Expedition (U222) for the 2003 model year and featured a new full front axle disconnect system with vacuum operated front locking hubs that would disconnect the front axle, front differential, and front drive shaft when not needed for quieter, more fuel-efficient operation on pavement. Ford claimed that the improved Two High mode could help increase fuel economy up to half-a-mile per gallon of gasoline. In Two High mode, torque is routed to the rear drive wheels only, imitating rear-wheel drive.

=== Auto mode ===
Auto mode was featured on both Explorer and Expedition and allows for all-weather, full-time four-wheel drive capability on pavement as needed. In Auto mode, the engine's torque is normally routed to the rear drive wheels. A misconception about the system is that it continuously shifts into and out of four-wheel drive as needed. This is not true, for when Auto mode is selected, the front axle hubs are permanently engaged, locking them to the front axle shafts, front differential, and front drive shaft. This is so the front drive shaft always rotates (turns) when the vehicle is being driven at speed. The computer control system needs the front drive shaft to turn, so that it can monitor and compare the rotational speed of both the front and rear drive shafts. If the rear drive shaft starts to turn faster than the front, the system interprets that (along with input from other sensors) as traction loss. When traction loss is detected, torque is sent forward to the front differential in 10 percent increments, via the center multi-disc clutch. As it does so, intelligent control software allows the center multi-disc clutch to behave like a geared center differential, such that "driveline binding" and "torque windup" do not occur.

In the early 2000s, ControlTrac was updated and introduced in 2002 with more advanced software programming, building on the system's artificial intelligence. The four-wheel drive system's updated artificial intelligence allowed the system to predict traction loss before it happened, so that torque can be transferred before it was needed. This improvement meant the system could operate more like other "always-on" full-time four-wheel drive systems as it no longer had to "wait" for traction loss to take action. Another improvement was front-to-rear "torque biasing" capability in Auto mode. ControlTrac's intelligent multi-disc differential could now send all 100 percent of the engine’s torque forward, biasing it to the front differential if severe traction loss was anticipated, predicted, or detected.

=== Four High and Four Low modes ===
Four High and Four Low modes were also featured on both Explorer and Expedition. Four High mode tells the intelligent locking multi-disc differential to lock, providing a permanently locked 50:50 torque distribution. The front and rear drive shafts are fully locked, forcing them to rotate at the same speed regardless of tractive conditions. Four Low mode also tells the intelligent locking multi-disc differential to lock, however it instructs the BorgWarner transfer case to select low range off-road reduction gearing. Reduction gearing is utilized to reduce the vehicle's speed to a manageable crawl, and to increase (multiply) the supplied torque coming from the engine. Thus the drive wheels have ample torque to move the vehicle at low speeds. It is also used to control downward speeds while descending steep gradients and to improve the vehicle's off-road crawl ratio.

Both Four High mode and Four Low mode cannot be used on pavement as "driveline binding" and "torque windup" can occur, causing damage to the four-wheel-drive system.

== AdvanceTrac ==
The automatic ControlTrac four-wheel drive system can be coupled with AdvanceTrac electronic stability control, which includes four-wheel electronic traction control. The combination of these two systems is innovative due to a vehicle equipped as such, can continue to move forward with only one wheel having traction. AdvanceTrac's four-wheel electronic traction control system uses the vehicle's four-wheel four-sensor four-channel anti-lock braking system (ABS) and is programmed with additional anti-slip logic to simulate differential locks via aggressively "brake locking" either the front or rear drive axle differentials. By ABS brake locking the front and rear differentials, up to 100 percent of torque can be sent to any one drive wheel, allowing the vehicle to keep moving, even with two of its drive wheels (one front, one rear) completely off the ground.

== ControlTrac II ==
ControlTrac II was a Ford four-wheel drive system based on a viscous coupling unit. The viscous coupling replaced the typical center differential used in four-wheel drive applications. The system worked normally in front wheel drive but in addition to the front wheels being driven, a shaft is powered that runs to the viscous coupling in the rear. If the front wheels slip, the viscous coupling progressively releases torque to the rear wheels. Additionally, the ControlTrac II system provided a mechanical lock of four-wheel drive though there was no low range provided by the system.

ControlTrac II has since been replaced by the automatic Intelligent four-wheel drive system, a similar system with the viscous coupling replaced by a computer controlled clutch. The Intelligent 4WD system functionally acts similar to the ControlTrac II system, with the front wheels being driven predominately with torque being sent to the rear wheels only as conditions dictate. The Intelligent 4WD system also lacks the mechanical lock provided by ControlTrac II.
