= Senator Todd =

Senator Todd may refer to:

- Andrew L. Todd Sr. (1872–1945), Tennessee State Senate
- Nancy Todd (born 1948), Colorado State Senate
- Robert Smith Todd (1791–1849), Kentucky State Senate
- Robert Todd (pioneer) (1754–1814), Kentucky State Senate
- S. J. Todd (1821–1902), Wisconsin State Senate
- Walker Todd (1780s–1840), New York State Senate

== See also ==
- Senator Tod (disambiguation)
