= BrightRoll =

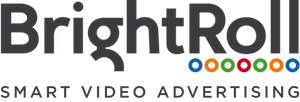
- Type: Subsidiary
- Industry: Advertising
- Founded: 2006; 20 years ago
- Founder: Tod Sacerdoti; Dru Nelson
- Headquarters: San Francisco, California, United States
- Parent: Yahoo! (2014–2017); Yahoo! Inc. (2017–present)
- Website: www.brightroll.com

BrightRoll was a programmatic video advertising platform that was acquired by Yahoo. BrightRoll's video platform became Yahoo's primary video advertising marketplace and demand-side platform. The BrightRoll brand was discontinued by Verizon Media, the parent company of Yahoo, in favor of Verizon Media Video SSP (re-brand of AOL's One Video Platform) after the company merged. Yahoo and AOL consolidated their ad platforms during 2017–2018 to phase out duplicate platforms.

BrightRoll was founded in June 2006 by Tod Sacerdoti, who became the company's CEO, and Dru Nelson. Its headquarters were in San Francisco, California, with offices across the United States, Canada, and Europe.

In November 2014, Yahoo! announced that it would acquire BrightRoll for $640 million.

== Funding ==
BrightRoll raised $36 million in capital, with the last round of funding closing in November 2011. Principal investors include Dave Welsh, Adams Street Partners, Rob Theis, Scale Venture Partners, Evangelos Simoudis, Trident Capital and Jon Callaghan of True Ventures.
