= George Todd =

George Todd may refer to:

- George M. Todd (died 1864), Confederate guerrilla leader during the American Civil War
- George Davidson Todd (1856–1929), American politician, mayor of Louisville, Kentucky, 1896–1897
- George Todd (Australian footballer) (1903–1986), Australian rules footballer
- George Todd (rugby league), English rugby league footballer of the 1930s

== See also ==
- George Tod (disambiguation)
