= Viscous coupling unit =

Clutch using viscous fluid to transfer torque

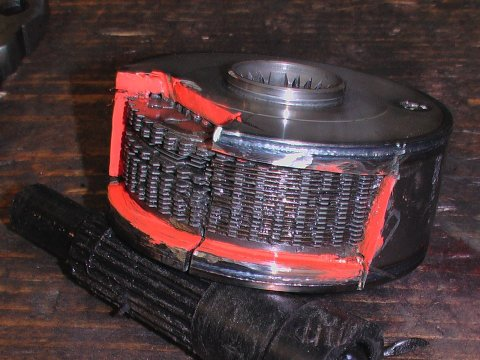
An example of a viscous coupling unit opened up

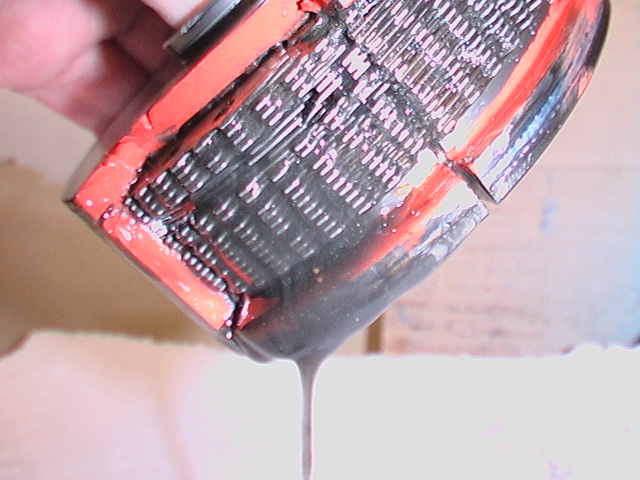
The fluid inside the VC

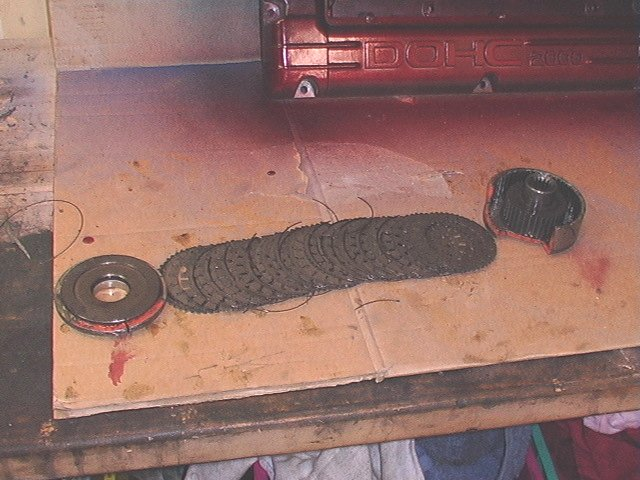
Completely disassembled

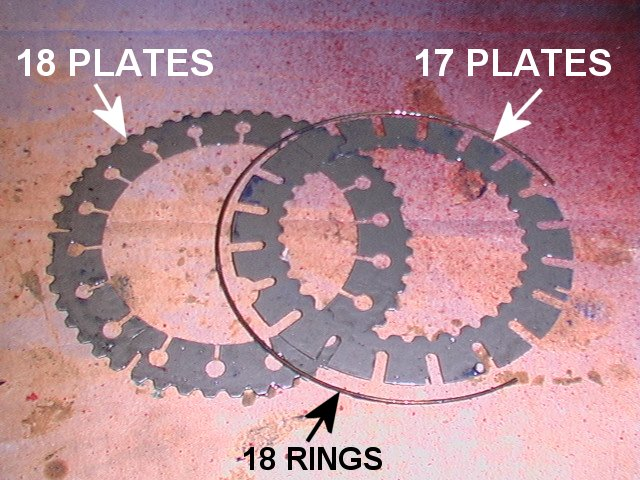
The internal plates

A viscous coupling is a sealed mechanical device that transfers torque and rotation between two shafts by means of a viscous fluid. One use is in automobiles as a differential, especially in four-wheel drive vehicles. The device works automatically without computers or electronics to link the rear axle to the front so that when one set of wheels starts to slip, torque will be transferred to the other axle.

== Design ==
Rotary viscous couplings for torque transmission or as torsional dampers have been used since the 1920s. The units typically have thin rotating plates and filled with a highly viscous fluid. One set of plates is connected to the power source and the other to the driving hub. The principal mechanism for transferring torque is based on the shearing of the viscous fluids and the unit's function is dependent on the rotation of the elements or plates inside. Thus, the coupling functions due to the viscous drag acting on the plates.

Units with interleaved, perforated plates, and filled with viscous fluids are used in automotive systems to transmit torque. Four-wheel-drive vehicles need to accommodate the differences in speed between the front and rear wheels while turning corners on dry, hard roads, as well as when wheels on one of the axles spin on slippery surfaces. A viscous coupling unit between the front and rear drive shafts provides for minor speed differences between the plates and functions like a limited-slip differential when there is a greater speed difference between the front and rear drive shafts.

The device consists of circular plates with tabs or perforations, fitted very close together in a sealed unit. Alternate plates are connected to a driving shaft at one end of the assembly and a driven shaft at the other end. The unit is filled with a dilatant fluid, often silicone-based, to about 80% by volume. When the two sets of plates are rotating in unison, the fluid stays cool and remains liquid. During operation, the shear friction between the silicone oil and the plates of a viscous coupling will generate heat and increase the temperature of the silicone fluid, inflate the volume, increase the internal pressure, and thus transfer more torque.

When the plates start rotating at different speeds, the shear effect of the tabs or perforations on the fluid causes it to heat and become nearly solid, as the viscosity of dilatant fluids increases rapidly with shear. The fluid in this state will effectively "glue" the plates together and transmit power from one set of plates to the other. The size of the tabs or perforations, the number of plates, and the fluid used will determine the strength and onset of this mechanical transfer.

This type of device differs from fluid couplings, such as torque converters, in that it uses the medium's viscosity to transfer torque rather than its momentum. This makes it potentially useful even on very small scales and requires less cooling. The torque transmitted is sensitive to the difference between the input and output speeds but is almost independent of their common rate.

== Vehicles ==
Viscous couplings are used as the center differential in some four-wheel-drive (4WD) vehicles.

The first mass-produced viscous couplings for a permanent 4WD off-road-capable vehicle were in the AMC Eagle, which was produced from 1980 to 1988 model years. American Motors Corporation (AMC) utilized a single-speed model 119 New Process central differential viscous coupling filled with a liquid silicone-based material. The unit permanently linked the front and rear axle differentials for quiet and smooth transfer of power to the axle with the greatest traction, on wet or dry pavement.

Viscous couplings are used as the center differential in cars such as the Toyota Celica GT-Four, and also as a limited-slip differential (LSD) in rear axles. They offer a less expensive alternative for implementing four-wheel drive than technologies like the mechanical-transfer Torsen differentials.

Volvo, Subaru, Land Rover, Vauxhall/Opel, and many others have also used viscous couplings in their drivelines at various times. They are now mostly superseded by electronically-controlled devices.

== See also ==
- Hele-Shaw clutch
