= Senator Tod =

Senator Tod may refer to:

- David Tod (1805–1868), Ohio State Senate
- George Tod (judge) (1773–1841), Ohio State Senate
- John Tod (1779–1830), Pennsylvania State Senate

== See also ==
- Senator Todd (disambiguation)
