= Tod Sacerdoti =

American businessperson

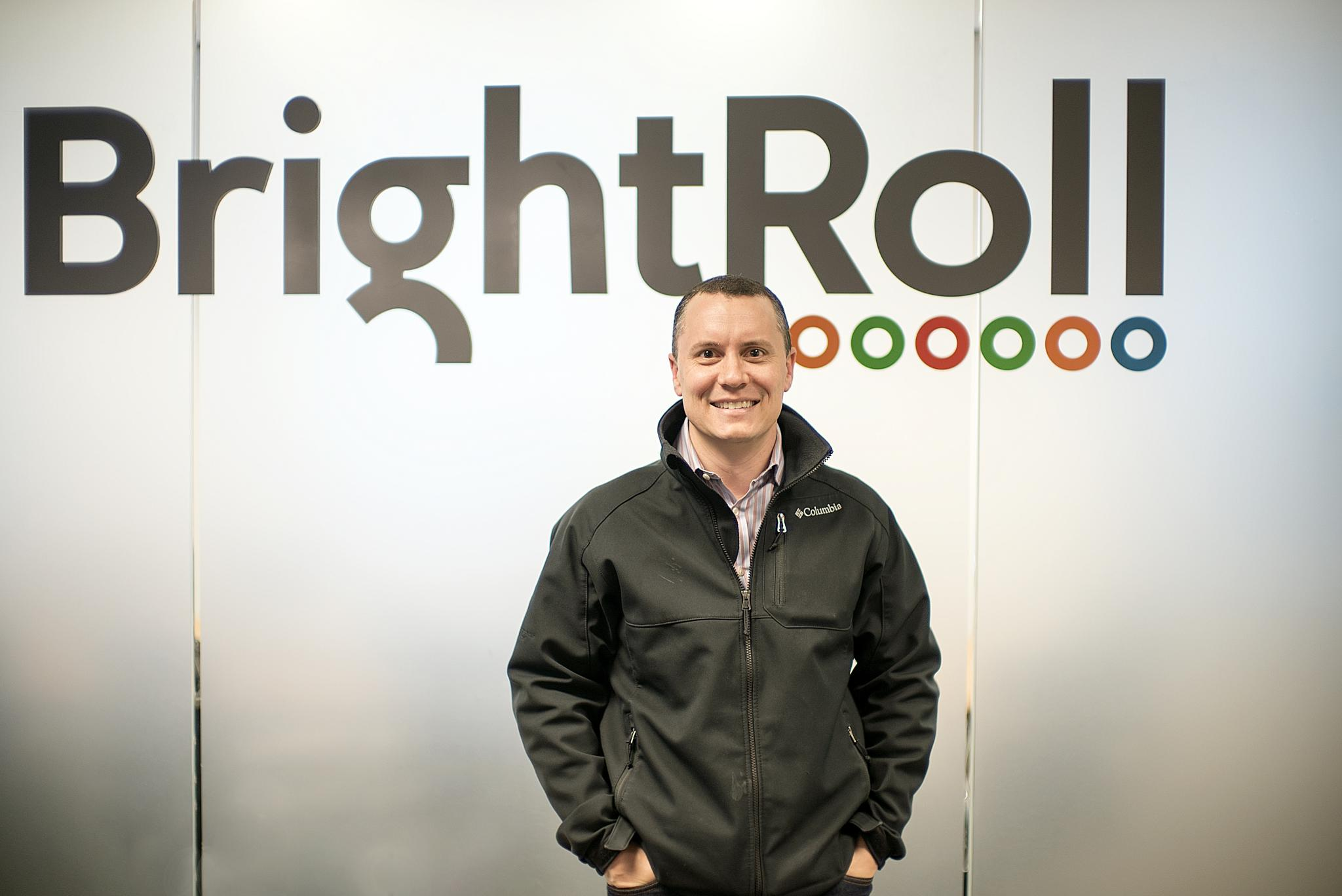
- Education: Yale University; Stanford University
- Occupations: Business executive and investor
- Known for: Founder of BrightRoll

Tod Sacerdoti is an American businessperson and investor. He is the founder and CEO of Pipedream. He is also a general partner at Flex Capital. Sacerdoti previously founded and was CEO of BrightRoll from 2006 until its acquisition by Yahoo! for $640 million in 2014. Following the acquisition, he was Vice President of Display and Video Advertising Products at Yahoo until 2017.

== Education ==
During high school Sacerdoti was a competitive badminton player. Sacerdoti received his undergraduate education from Yale University, where he was president of the fraternity Sigma Alpha Epsilon, and then received an MBA from the Stanford Graduate School of Business.

== Career ==
Sacerdoti began his career as an investment banking analyst at Robertson Stephens. He later worked as Director of Business Development at Spoke Software, and eventually at Plaxo as Director of Revenue and Business Development. In 2006 he founded the company BrightRoll with business partner Dru Nelson, and was the company’s CEO.

In 2014 Sacerdoti sold BrightRoll to Yahoo for $640 million. Following this, he joined Yahoo and was the company’s Vice President, Display and Video Advertising Products. In 2016, Sacerdoti was one of the key figures on the response team to various public technical problems and ad traffic issues. Sacerdoti has stated that traditional media is unable to keep up with digital media in terms of ad revenue, largely because of software that automates ad selling and buying. He has also been an investor in other private companies.

After leaving Yahoo, Sacerdoti worked as an investor at Flex Capital. In 2019, he and seven former BrightRoll employees founded Pipedream, an integration platform for building workflows and connecting cloud services. In November 2025, Workday announced a definitive agreement to acquire Pipedream, and in February 2026 the company said it had closed the acquisition.

== Recognition ==
In 2012 Sacerdoti was named to the forty under forty of the San Francisco Business Times. He then received a Bronze Stevie Award for innovator of the year in computer software in 2013. In 2014 Sacerdoti was awarded the EY Entrepreneur of the Year – Media, Entertainment and Communications Award.
