= George Tod (footballer) =

Scottish footballer

Personal information
- Full name: George Tod
- Date of birth: 1880
- Place of birth: Glasgow, Scotland
- Date of death: 1930 (aged 49–50)
- Position: Wing-half

Senior career*
Years	Team	Apps	(Gls)
1899–1900	Linthouse		
1900–1907	Preston North End	131	(4)
1907–1908	Grimsby Town	0	(0)
Total		131	(4)
- * Club domestic league appearances and goals

George Tod (1880–1930) was a Scottish footballer who played in the Football League for Preston North End.
