= George Tod (surveyor) =

George Tod was a British surveyor and hothouse builder who provided colour illustrations and descriptions of 26 "glass houses," chiefly of his own design, in an 1807 publication. The text presents plans, elevations and sections of hothouses, greenhouses, conservatories, and an aquarium built in different parts of England for various noblemen and gentlemen, including a hothouse and greenhouse in the gardens at Frogmore. In a review in The Literary Panorama of 1807, Tod's book is priced at £2. 12s. 6d., and is praised for giving greenhouse examples that could be reproduced "by any ingenious workman".
