= Lancelot Errington =

Lancelot Errington, also Launcelot or Lancelott, (1657–1745) was a master mariner noted for his capture of Lindisfarne during the Jacobite rising of 1715.

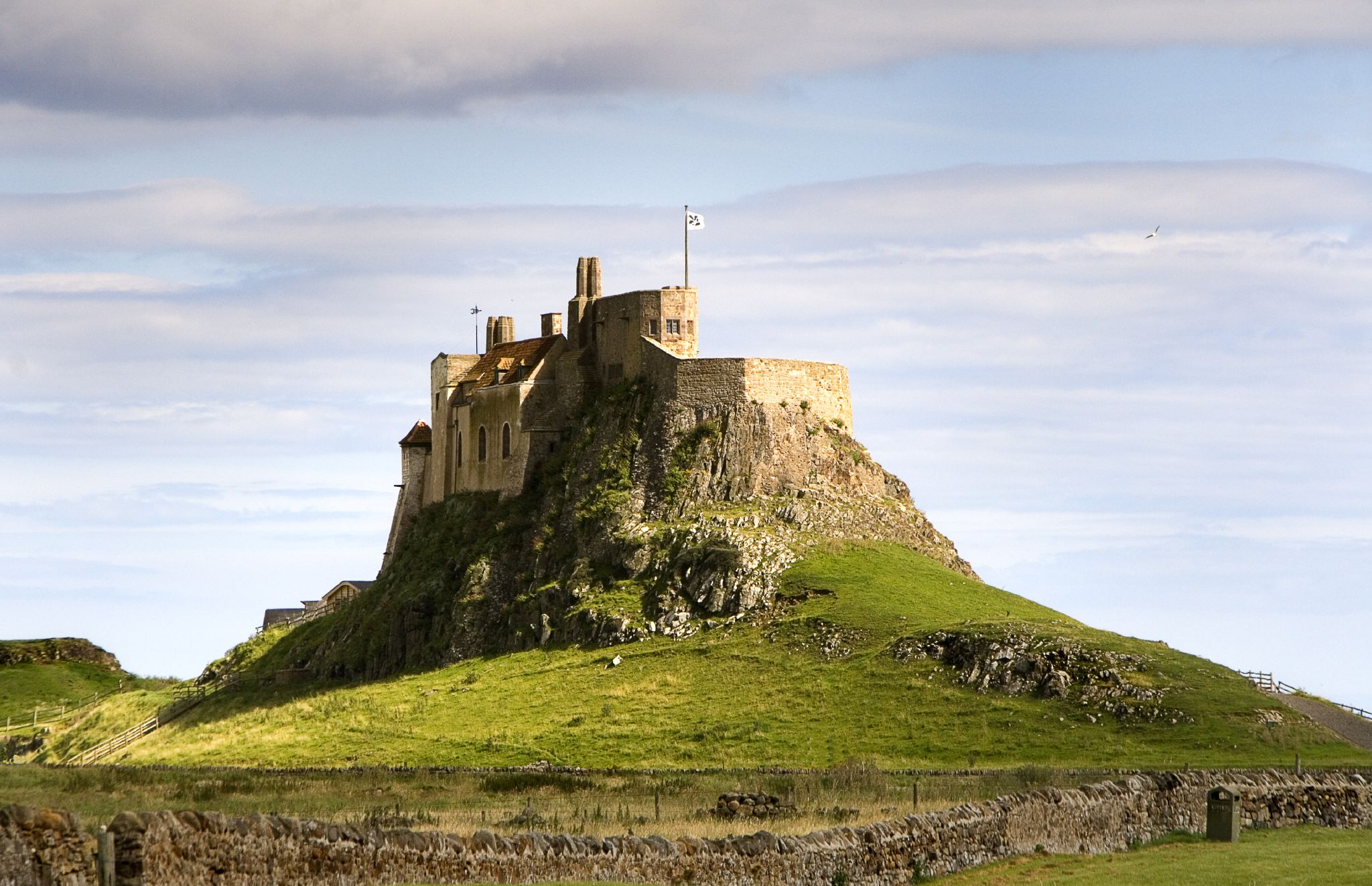
Lindisfarne Castle

== Background ==
After the Glorious Revolution of 1688–89 resulted in the Roman Catholic Stuart king, James II of England and VII of Scotland, fleeing to exile in France, James' daughter and her husband, William III and Mary II, ascended the British throne as joint sovereigns, and were succeeded by the Protestant House of Hanover. In 1715, James II's son James Francis Edward Stuart, also known as the Old Pretender, attempted to regain the throne by launching a Jacobite rising in Scotland.

Lancelot Errington is known to have come from Denton in Newburn, an "ancient and respectable family in Northumberland." His parents were Major Gilbert Errington and Margaret Babington, and he married his cousin, Catherine Errington. Lancelot was one of a number of locals who supported the Jacobite cause, led by Thomas Forster, Member of Parliament for the county of Northumberland. Their first objective was to gain a landing site in Northumberland, and Lindisfarne was selected.

== Capture ==
On 10 October 1715, Lancelot and his nephew Mark Errington visited the castle on Lindisfarne. Some sources say that Lancelot asked the Master Gunner, who also served as the unit's barber, for a shave. While inside it became clear that most of the garrison was away. Later that day he returned with Mark, and claimed that he had lost the key to his watch. They were allowed in, overpowered the three soldiers present, and claimed the castle for the Jacobites. Some sources say that he gave brandy to the soldiers in order to incapacitate them.

Reinforcements did not arrive to support the Erringtons, so when a detachment of 100 men arrived from Berwick to retake the castle they were only able to hold out for one day, before being captured.

== Later life ==
Lancelot, along with his nephew, was able to tunnel out of Berwick Tolbooth and escape. A pardon was issued and he was able to live out the rest of his life as a publican in Newcastle upon Tyne. He lived until December 1745, long enough to witness the final Jacobite rising of 1745. His widow Catherine died at Cramlington in 1756.
