= Lamberton Skerrs =

- Headland
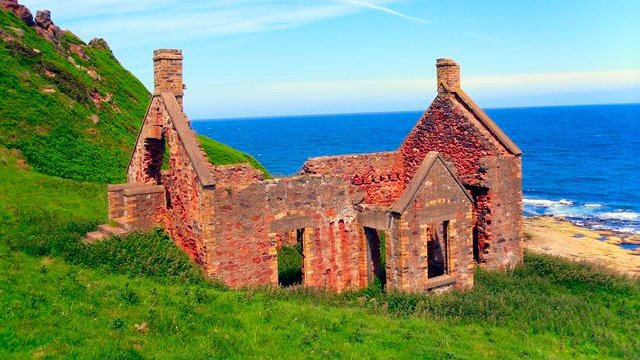
- Fishery Ruin

- Location within Scotland
- Coordinates: 55.822844°N 2.051128°W
- Grid position: NT968588
- Location: Scotland

Lamberton Skerrs is towards the southernmost point on the east coast of Scotland. It was the scene of a building known as the "Smuggler's Bothy" which was built by the famous smuggler John Robertson in about 1760 and stands on the cliffs overlooking the North Sea. He smuggled tea and was in partnership with a Swedish shipping line. The cover for the operation was fishing but the building was actually later used as a fishery cottage. It was eventually destroyed by vandals who set it alight. A rusted net winch and storage caves built into the rocks are all that remains of the fishery.

The East Coast Main Line railway runs right by the location before passing over the border at Marshall Meadows Bay and stopping at Berwick-Upon-Tweed.

== See also ==
- Lamberton, Scottish Borders
