= List of extreme points of England =

This is a list of the extreme points of England: the points that are farther north, south, east or west than any other location, as well as the highest and lowest points.

== England (including islands) ==
- Northernmost point – Marshall Meadows Bay, Northumberland at 55°48′N 2°02′W
- Northernmost settlement – Marshall Meadows, Northumberland at 55°48′N 2°02′W
- Southernmost point – Pednathise Head, Western Rocks at 49°51′N 6°24′W
- Southernmost settlement – St Agnes, Isles of Scilly at 49°53′N 6°20′W
- Westernmost point – Crim Rocks, Isles of Scilly at 49°53′N 6°27′W
- Westernmost settlement – St Agnes, Isles of Scilly at 49°53′N 6°21′W
- Easternmost point – Lowestoft Ness, Suffolk at 52°29′N 1°46′E
- Easternmost settlement – Lowestoft, Suffolk at 52°28′N 1°45′E

== England (mainland) ==
- Northernmost point – Marshall Meadows Bay, Northumberland at 55°48′N 2°02′W
- Northernmost settlement – Marshall Meadows, Northumberland at 55°48′N 2°02′W
- Southernmost point – Lizard Point, Cornwall at 49°57′N 5°12′W
- Southernmost settlement – Lizard, Cornwall at 49°57′N 5°12′W
- Westernmost point – Land's End, Cornwall at 50°04′N 5°43′W
- Westernmost settlement – Sennen Cove, Cornwall at 50°04′N 5°42′W
- Easternmost point – Lowestoft Ness, Suffolk at 52°29′N 1°46′E
- Easternmost settlement – Lowestoft, Suffolk at 52°28′N 1°45′E
- Highest point – Scafell Pike, Cumberland.
- Lowest point – Holme Fen, Huntingdonshire.

== See also ==
- Extreme points of the United Kingdom
- Extreme points of Europe
- Extreme points of Earth
- Geography of England
