= Berwick Town Hall =

Municipal building in Berwick, Northumberland, England

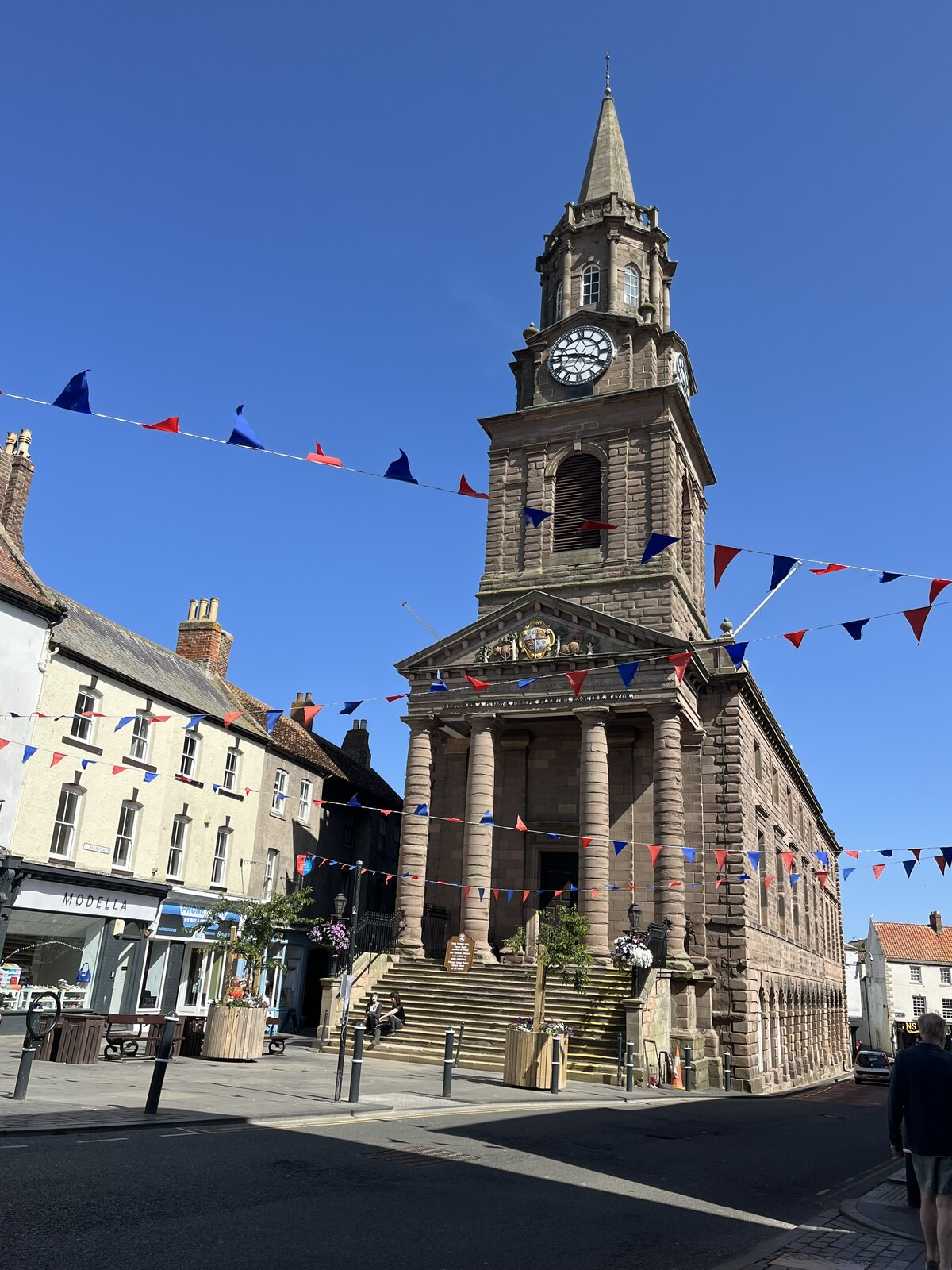
- View from Marygate

- Shown in Northumberland
- 55.7694°N 2.0030°W
- Location: Berwick-upon-Tweed

History
- Built: 1760

Site notes
- Architect(s): Samuel and John Worrell
- Architectural style: Neoclassical style

Listed Building – Grade I
- Official name: The Town Hall
- Designated: 1 August 1952
- Reference no.: 1290051

Berwick Town Hall is a municipal facility in Marygate, Berwick-upon-Tweed, England. The town hall, which was the headquarters of Berwick-upon-Tweed Borough Council, is a Grade I listed building.

== History ==
The current building was commissioned to replace an earlier tolbooth which dated back to the late 13th century. The tolbooth was rebuilt in the late 16th century, and again in 1669. Lancelot Errington, a master mariner noted for his capture of Lindisfarne during the Jacobite rising of 1715, was arrested and held at the tolbooth along with his nephew in October 1715, but they managed to tunnel out of the building, escape and were subsequently pardoned. The tolbooth was demolished in 1750 in order the facilitate the construction of the eastern end of the current building.

The construction of the new building, which was undertaken by local builder, Joseph Dodds, began at the western end in 1754. It was designed by Samuel and John Worrell in the neoclassical style and, after the eastern end had been completed, it opened as Berwick Town Hall in 1760. The design involved a symmetrical main frontage facing west along Marygate; it featured a tetrastyle portico, approached by a flight of steps, with Tuscan order columns supporting a frieze with the inscription "Finished MDCCLIV William Temple Esq, Mayor" and a pediment above containing the borough coat of arms; Pevsner described the monumental portico as "Vanbrughian". A 150-foot (46 m) belfry and clock tower with a weather vane, designed in a similar design to St Martin-in-the-Fields, towered above the portico. In 1754 the bells of the old tollbooth were recast into a new ring of eight by Thomas Lister and Thomas Rach of London, and installed in the tower along with a new clock (which chimed the quarters on three of the bells).

Internally, the principal room was the assembly hall on the first floor: it featured a Venetian window at the east end and was used, among other things, for the Court of quarter sessions. There was also a separate Council Chamber, committee room and offices provided on the same floor. Prison cells were established on the top floor. The basement storey was largely taken up by shops, and in the open space under the east end of the hall a weekly egg and butter market was held.

After the Second World War the proposed demolition of the town hall was considered by the borough council, but after a campaign by the architect, Sir Albert Richardson, opposing the proposal, it was extensively refurbished instead. As part of the refurbishment a new clock was provided by Charles Potts in 1947, which sounds the Westminster Quarters on the bells. Queen Elizabeth II, accompanied by the Duke of Edinburgh, toured the restored building with Richardson on 10 July 1956.

The town hall served as the meeting place of Berwick-upon-Tweed Borough Council until it was abolished in April 2009 and subsequently became the meeting place of Berwick-upon-Tweed Town Council.

Works of art in the town hall include a portrait of Robert Home, who served as town clerk in the mid 19th century, by the former President of the Royal Scottish Academy, Daniel Macnee.

Eastern end

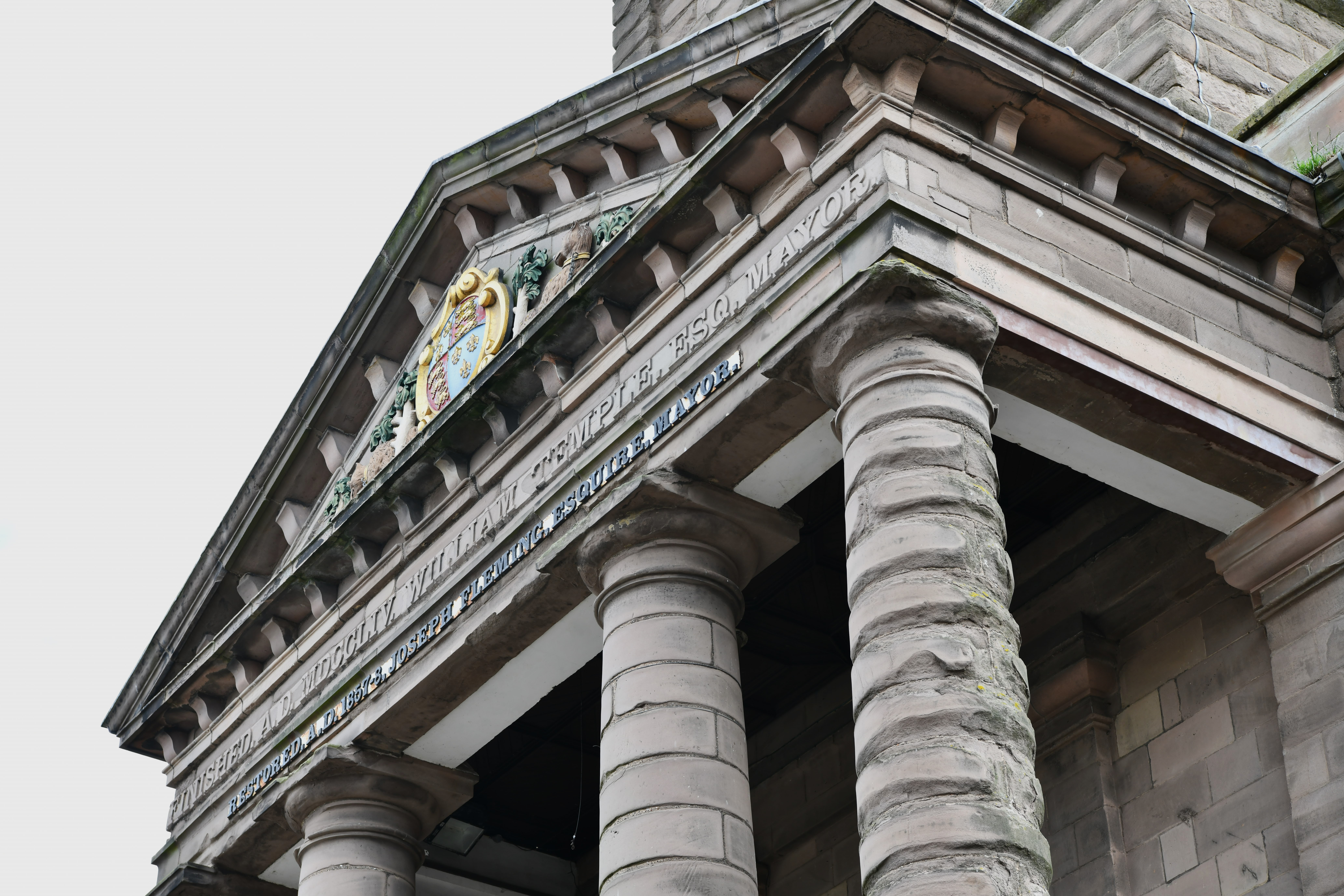
Portico

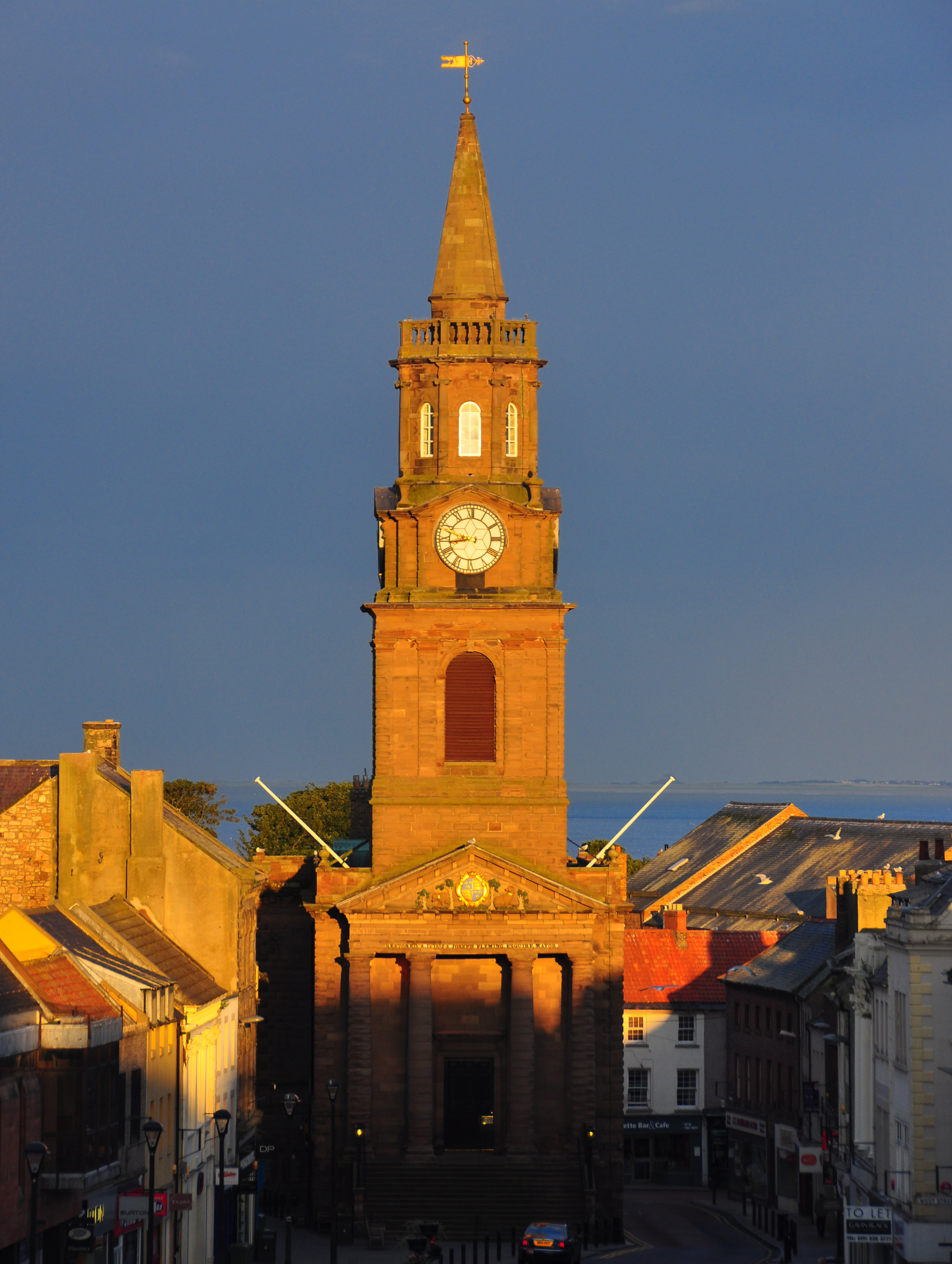
The tower at sunset

== Bells ==
The tower above the building has a ring of eight bells and a curfew bell. Lester and Pack of the Whitechapel Bell Foundry cast the tenor, third, fourth and treble bells in 1754 and the fifth and sixth bells in 1759. Charles Carr of Smethwick cast the second and curfew bells in 1894. Mears and Stainbank of the Whitechapel Bell Foundry cast the seventh bell in 1901.
