= Anne Hepple =

British writer and editor (1877–1959)

Anne Hepple Dickinson
- Born: Anne Hepple Batty; 16 October 1877; Widdrington, England, UK
- Died: 10 November 1959 (aged 82); Kendal, Westmorland, England, UK
- Occupation: Writer
- Spouse: William Bain Dickinson
- Children: 2
- Relatives: Agnes Ancroft (half-sister)
- Writing career
- Pen name: Anne Hepple
- Language: English language
- Period: 1928-1956

Anne Hepple Dickinson, née Batty, (16 October 1877 – 10 November 1959), was a British writer and editor, who wrote over 25 romantic novels under the pseudonym Anne Hepple. She was the first editor of The Woman's Magazine in London from 1931 to 1934.

== Life ==
Anne Hepple Batty was born on 16 October 1877 in Widdrington, Northumberland, England. Daughter of Jane Emma, née Dodds (1857–1878) and George Batty (1852–1910). She had two brothers: Joseph (1876–1910) and John George Batty (1879–1887), a halfbrother: George Lennox Batty (1884–1979), and a half-sister: Agnes Mary Batty (1890–1982), who also was a writer as Agnes Ancroft.

She married William Bain Dickinson at Berwick Parish Church in 1903, and they had a daughter: Hepple (1905), and a son: Bain (1907). They lived in Castle Terrace, Berwick-upon-Tweed, England, and other locations in the Berwickshire area.

After her children were grown, she started to published as Anne Hepple. She published her first novel in 1928. In the 1930s, Anne moved to London to become editor of The Woman's Magazine, a monthly publication around thirty pages in length, which cost a shilling. Her name was prominently displayed on the front cover of the magazine under the title. She answered readers’ questions in the column “Letters Grave and Gay”, and in 1933 and 1934 wrote an editorial page. The magazine mixed fiction with practical articles on dress making, cooking, decorating, travel, and so on. A number of her short stories appeared in the magazine, and some of her novels were serialized in the magazine before being published in book form.

Anne Hepple Dickinson died at her daughter's house in Kendal, Westmorland, England, on 10 November 1959.

== Works ==
- Jemima Rides [1928]
- The Untempered Wind [1930]
- Gay Go Up [1931]
- The Runaway Family [(1929?)/1932]
- The Old Woman Speaks [1933]
- Scotch Broth [1933]
- Ask Me No More [1934]
- Annals Of A Little Shop [1935]
- And Then Came Spring [1935]
- Heyday And Maydays [1936]
- Touch-Me-Not [1936]
- Touch-Me-Again [1936]
- Sweet Ladies [1936]
- Heydays and Maydays [1937]
- Susan Takes A Hand [1938]
- Riders Of the Sea [1938]
- Evening At The Farm [1939]
- The Piper in the Wind [1939]
- The Taking Men [1940]
- The Green Road To Wedderlee [1942]
- The North Wind Blows [1942]
- Sigh No More [1943]
- Sally Cockenzie [1944]
- Can I Go There? [1945]
- Family Affairs and Ships and Things [1947]
- The House Of Gow [1948]
- Jane Of Gowlands [1949]
- The Mettlesome Piece [1951]
- Janet Forsythe [1956]
- I Want You To Come Here To Me [?]
