= Marshall Meadows Bay =

Bay and northernmost point of England

Marshall Meadows Bay Northernmost point of England
- Bay
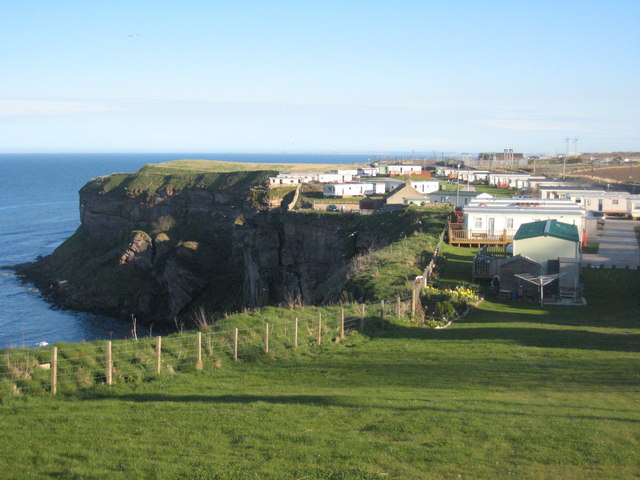
- Caravan site above the bay
- Interactive map of Marshall Meadows Bay
- Coordinates: 55.8111°N 2.0343°W
- Grid position: NT 9845 5689
- Location: Northumberland, England, UK

Marshall Meadows Bay is a small bay located on the Northumberland coast, England, 2 1/2 miles (4 kilometres) north of Berwick-upon-Tweed. Just to the north of the bay lies the Anglo-Scottish border and the northernmost point of England. Across the border in Scotland is the county of Berwickshire in the Borders region.

The hamlet of Marshall Meadows lies to the west of the bay, and is the most northerly inhabited place in England. The Marshall Meadows Manor House Hotel is here, along with a farm and a caravan site. There is a disused tunnel from the caravan site to the bay below, and there is a small cave 300 m (1,000 ft) north of this tunnel, plus another small cave just around the corner of Marshall Meadows Point. Nearby is the A1 trunk road and the East Coast Main Line railway.

The Berwickshire Coastal Path from Berwick to Eyemouth runs along the clifftop at Marshall Meadows Bay. The cliffs are about fifty metres high. Borders Buses operates a regular service between Berwick and St Abbs, stopping at New East Farm, a short walk from Marshall Meadows Bay.

== Land's End to Marshall Meadows Bay ==
The length of the English mainland is delineated by the distance between Marshall Meadows Bay and Land's End in Cornwall, the southwesternmost point on the mainland (but not the southernmost, which is Lizard Point). The distance is 556 miles (895 km) by road or 426 miles (686 km) as the crow flies. The traversal of the length of England is sometimes used to define charitable events such as walks and cycle-rides. A variant is the Four Points Challenge, to walk to each of the four extremities of England and return to the starting point. Marshall Meadows Bay is closer to Stavanger in Norway than it is to Land's End.

== History of the northernmost point of England ==
The location of the northernmost point of England has varied over time, dependent upon the location of the Anglo-Scottish border. The Kingdom of England emerged from various Anglo-Saxon kingdoms in the early 10th century, with the Humber and Ribble rivers on its northernmost border. The Kingdom of Northumbria was unified with Anglo-Saxon England in the mid 10th century, extending England's borders northwards to the River Forth and Edinburgh. Lothian was lost to the Scots at the Battle of Carham in 1018, and Tweedmouth became England's northernmost point, with the River Tweed as the border. Control of Berwick-upon-Tweed alternated between England and Scotland in the following centuries, with the town being finally retaken by the English in 1482. The current border was established at Marshall Meadows Bay in the Treaty of Fotheringhay of 11 June 1482.

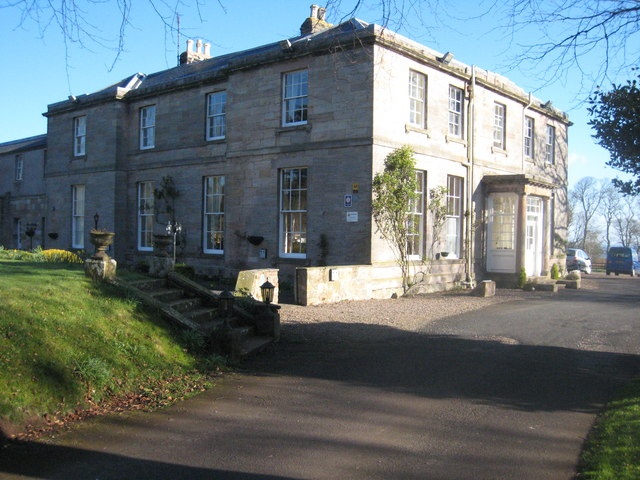
Marshall Meadows House

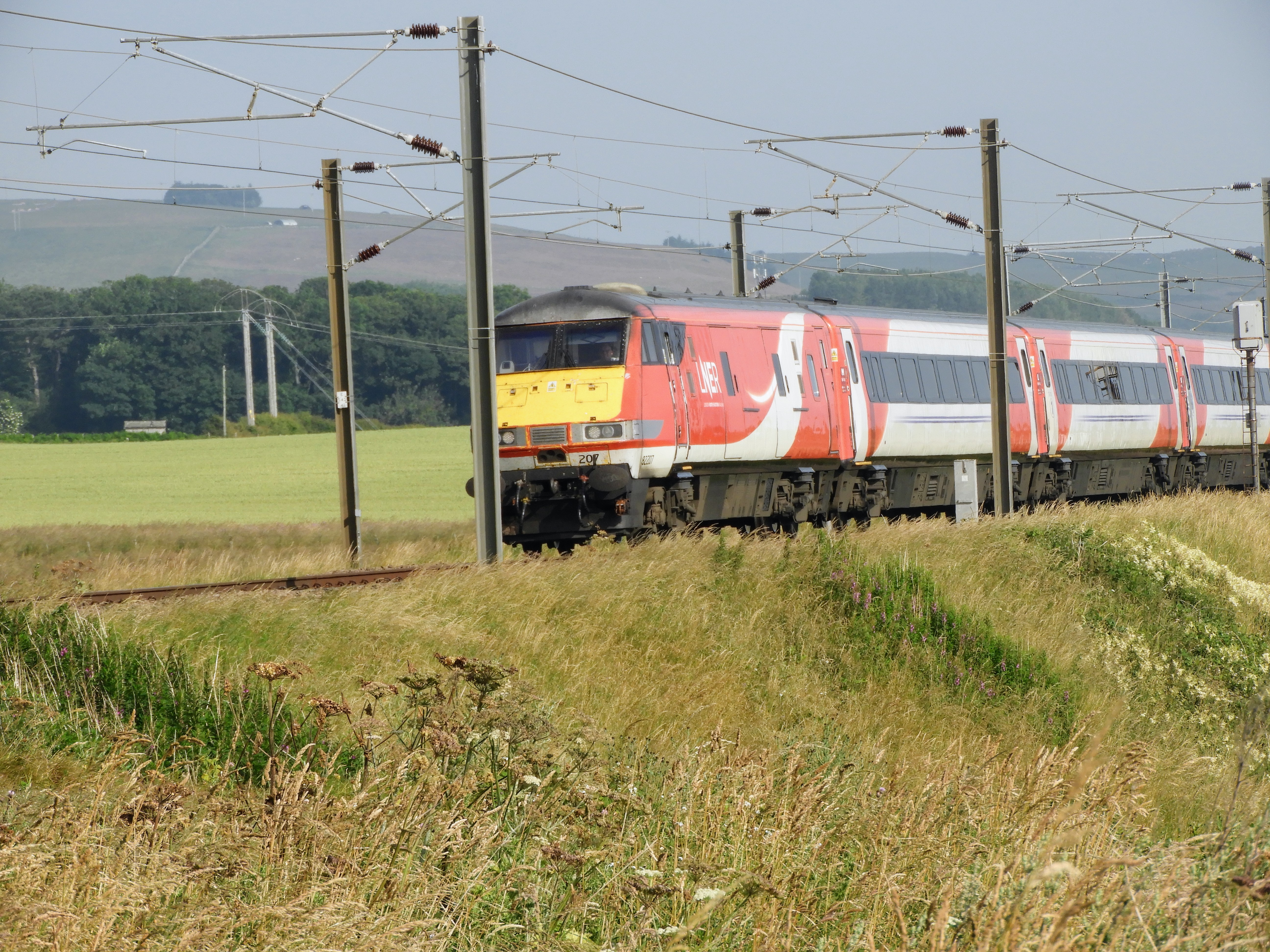
East Coast Main Line at
Marshall Meadows

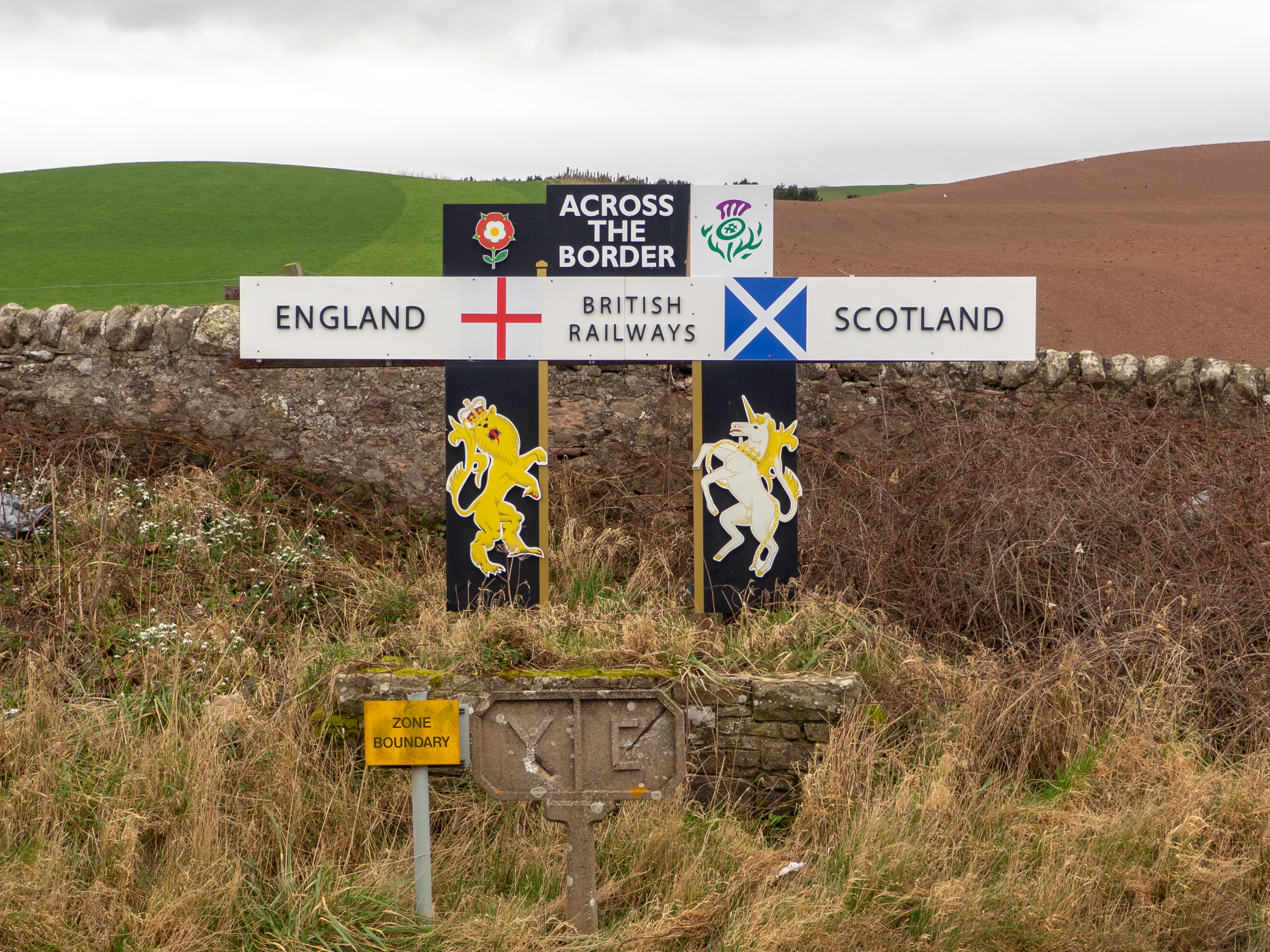
The Border on the East Coast Main Line

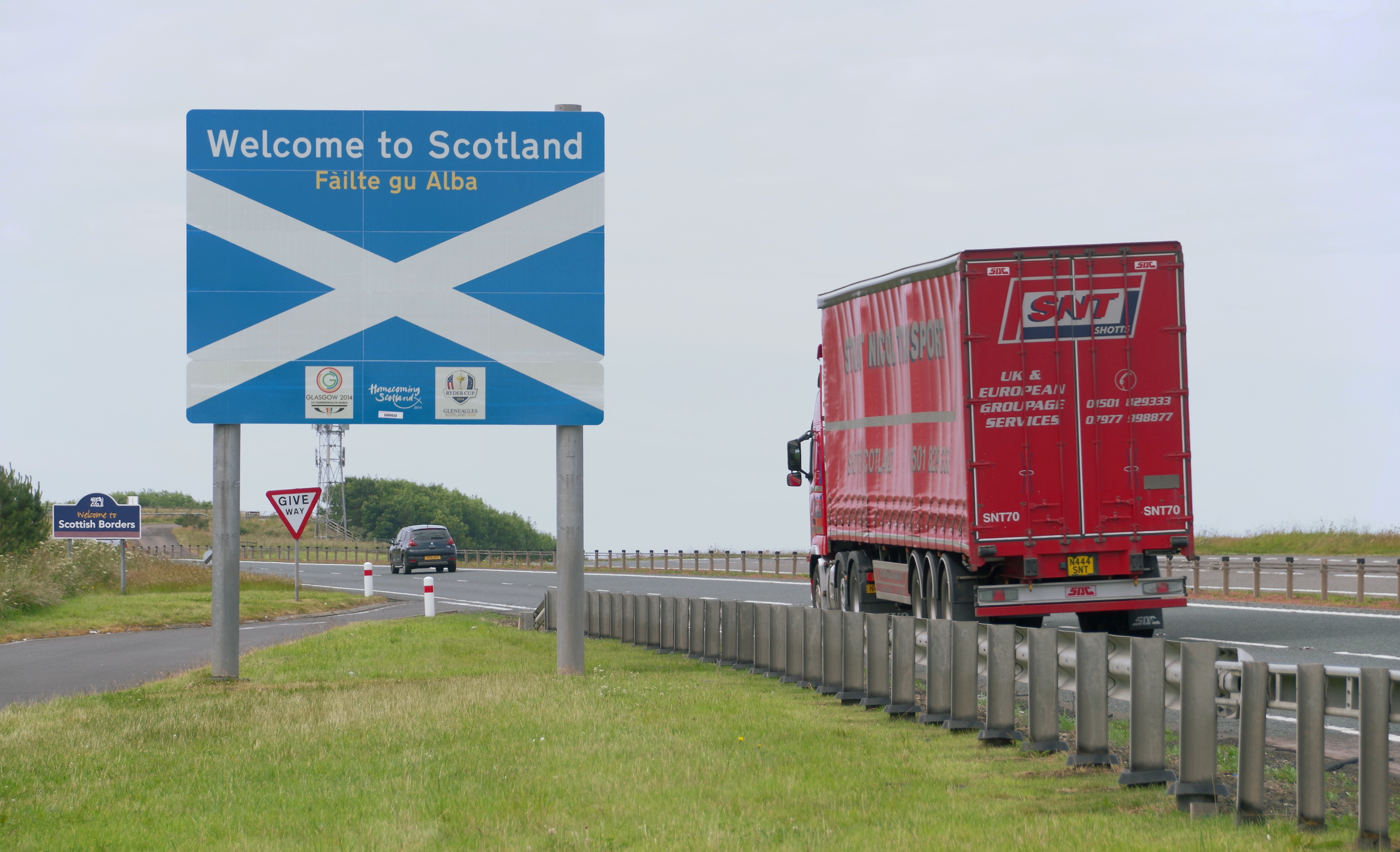
The Border on the A1

== See also ==
- Lizard Point, southernmost point of mainland England.
- Land's End, westernmost point of mainland England.
- Ness Point, easternmost point of England.
- Lamberton Skerrs, to the north of Marshall Meadows Bay in Scotland
