= List of ships named Berwick =

A number of ships have been named for Berwick-upon-Tweed:

- Berwick (1795 ship) was launched at Calcutta in 1795. She made three voyages for the British East India Company. On her maiden voyage, which was under the auspices of the EIC, she carried rice from Bengal for the British government to alleviate grain shortages in England. When she arrived in England she changed her registry to that of Great Britain. Between her second and third voyages for the EIC Berwick was a West Indiaman, sailing primarily to Barbados. In the 1820s she sailed to Van Diemen's Land. She made her third voyage for the EIC in 1825. She was wrecked in 1827 on a return voyage from India.
- Berwick Packet (1798 ship) was a smack launched at Berwick in 1798. She sailed for some years for the Old Ship Company, of Berwick, in the packet trade between London and Berwick. After a change of ownership and homeport around 1806, Berwick Packet traded more widely. In 1808 she repelled an attack by a French privateer. In 1809 Berwick Packet served briefly as a transport in an army-navy campaign. She then returned to mercantile trade until she was wrecked in November 1827 on a voyage from the Baltic.

== See also ==
- HMS Berwick – any one of ten vessels of the Royal Navy
