= Thomas Smith (English soldier) =

English soldier

Thomas Smith (fl. 1600–1627), was an English soldier, of Berwick-upon-Tweed, as he styles himself on the title-page of the first edition (4to, 1600) of "The Art of Gunnery: wherein is set forth a number of serviceable secrets and practicall conclusions belonging to the Art of Gunnerie, by Arithmeticke skill to be accomplished: both pretie, pleasant and profitable for all such as are professors of the same facultie". In the dedication to Peregrine Bertie, lord Willoughby, "lord-governor of the town and castle of Berwick-upon-Tweed, and lord-warden of the east marches of England", he describes himself as "but one of the meanest soldiers in this garrison", though he claims to have been "brought up from childhood under a valiant captain in military profession, in which I have had a desire to practise and learn some secrets touching the orders of the field and training of soldiers, as also concerning the art of managing and shooting in great artillery". From the open preference which he gives to theory over practice it may be inferred that "he never buckled with the enemy in the field". In 1627 he published "Certain Additions to the Booke of Gunnery, with a Supply of Fire-Workes" (4to), in which he still styles himself "Soldier of Berwick-upon-Tweed".

He speaks also, in 1600, of having written "two or three years since, Arithmeticall Military Conclusions, and bestowed on my Captain, Sir John Carie, knight: the which, God sparing my life, I mean to connect and enlarge and perhaps put to the press". It does not seem to have been published.
