= Minister of South Berwick =

Christian minister in Medieval Scotland

The Minister of South Berwick was the head of the medieval house of non-mendicant Augustinian Trinatarian friars (also known as Red Friars) in the Scottish border town of South Berwick. The income of the house was allocated equally towards the upkeep of the brethren, the sustenance of the poor and the poor travellers and the recovery of crusader captives. The house was founded before 1240–8. Each house comprised a minister and five brethren. The names of all of the ministers are incomplete.

== List of ministers ==
- Adam 1296
- Andrew de Scotlandwell (Fontescocie) 1387 – x1414
- John de St Andrews (Andirstoun) x1414 – 1428?
- John Gutherie (Butheoy) x1446 – 1447 (Note: Gutherie given provision by minister-general of the Order of Trinitarian Friars and was in possession before 8 October 1446. He was also in possession of the rectory of the church of Kettins in Angus on 11 December 1447 which was in the possession of Gutherie's predecessor John de St Andrews.)
- Edward Gray 1446 – 1447 (Note: Gray was given the commend to Kettins on the death of John de St Andrews (this was after a nomination to the Pope for the post by the king and dauphin of France). He did not have possession at the time of receiving a comissio privationis against Restoun for its possession on 8 October 1446.)
- William Restoun 1446 (Note: Restoun had some sort of amorphous claim to Kettins when Gray obtains the comissio privationis in opposition to him.)
- David Craig (Crach) 1456 – 1458
- Robert Clegston (Clugston) 1456 – 1474
- Thomas Lothian 1466
- John Ker 1471

== Bibliography ==
- Watt, D. E. R.; Shead, N. F., eds. (2001), The Heads of Religious Houses in Scotland from Twelfth to Sixteenth Centuries, The Scottish Record Society, New Series, Volume 24 (Revised ed.), Edinburgh: The Scottish Record Society, ISBN 0-902054-18-X, ISSN 0143-9448
- Cowan, Ian B.; Easson, David E. (1976), Medieval Religious Houses: Scotland With an Appendix on the Houses in the Isle of Man (2nd ed.), London and New York: Longman, ISBN 0-582-12069-1
