= Lamberton, Scottish Borders =

Coordinates: 55.808°N 2.055°W

Lamberton
- Location within the Scottish Borders
- OS grid reference: NT967572
- Council area: Scottish Borders
- Lieutenancy area: Berwickshire
- Country: Scotland
- Sovereign state: United Kingdom
- Post town: BERWICK-UPON-TWEED
- Postcode district: TD15
- Police: Scotland
- Fire: Scottish
- Ambulance: Scottish
- UK Parliament: Berwickshire, Roxburgh and Selkirk
- Scottish Parliament: Ettrick, Roxburgh and Berwickshire

Lamberton is a hilly, former landed estate in Berwickshire, Scotland, its eastern boundary being the North Sea. It is 4 miles (6.4 km) north of Berwick-upon-Tweed, on the Great North Road (today the A1).

== Original family ==
Adam de Lamberton gave a charter of a third part of his land of Lamberton to his grandson, Galfrido de Hasswell between 1190 and 1200.

In the National Archives of Scotland (RH1/2/59) there is a charter of Sir Peter de Mordington, knt., son of the deceased Sir William de Mordington, as superior, in favour of Simon de Baddeby of certain lands in Lamberton, dated 1270. A William de Lamberton was superior c. 1318.

== Barony ==
Some records give Lamberton as a feudal barony; others that it became part of the vast barony assigned to Coldingham Priory. (It may be partly both).

== Renton family ==
A charter (RH1/2/98) dated November 21, 1325 of Agnes de Mordington, in favour of John de Raynton, thereafter designated as "of Lamberton", appears to herald the long possession of Lamberton by this family, descendants of the ancient foresters of Coldingham Priory. "Robert de Renton, Lord of Lamberton" was in possession in 1407. In 1632 David Renton of Billie held "the forty husbandlands (1040 acres) of Lambertoun within the lordship of Coldingham".

By the 18th century the Rentons had passed their ancient estate of Billie to the Homes, but retained Lamberton. The Rentons of Lamberton were in the early 19th century represented by Alexander Renton of Lamberton (d. before March 1831), who was served his father's heir in the lands and mains of Lamberton in 1774, and whose only child, a daughter Susanna, married Robert Campbell, a Colonel in the 42nd (Royal Highland) Regiment of Foot. Their son, Charles Frederick (1819 - 1891), Colonel in the 87th Regiment of Foot, hyphenated his surname. The Campbell-Rentons of Lamberton, and, later, Mordington House, also failed in the male line with the death in 1948 of Robert Charles Campbell-Renton.

== Lamberton kirk and royal connections ==
Only ruins of the nave and chancel of Lamberton Kirk remain, as the burial-place of the Rentons of Lamberton. Lamberton Kirk was the church where, in July 1503, Margaret Tudor the daughter of King Henry VII of England, met the representatives of King James IV of Scotland. The meeting was celebrated with a tournament on Lamberton Moor featured English and Scottish knights from both England. The marriage led to the eventual succession of James VI and I to the throne of England.

On 17 April 1573, during the Marian civil war, Lord Ruthven finalised terms with the English commander William Drury, Marshall of Berwick, at Lamberton Kirk, to bring an English army and artillery to capture Edinburgh Castle, which was held by William Kirkcaldy of Grange for Mary, Queen of Scots.

=== Links with the Earls of Eglintoun ===
Susanna Montgomerie (died 27 July 1754) was the third daughter of Alexander Montgomerie, 9th Earl of Eglinton by his third wife, Susanna Kennedy, daughter of Sir Archibald Kennedy of Culzean. She married (before 1 August 1739) John Renton of Lamberton and had two daughters: Susan Renton who married Sir Robert Murray of Clermont and Hillhead, 6th Bart (died 1771); and Eleonora Renton who married (22 August 1770) Charles Kirkpatrick Sharpe of Hoddom (1750–1813).

== Irregular marriages ==
The now demolished Old Toll House at Lamberton, situated just across the border in Scotland, was famous for its irregular marriages. From 1798 to 1858 keepers of the Toll, as well as questionable men-of-the-cloth used to marry couples in the same fashion as at the more familiar Gretna Green. The site of the house is marked by a plaque.

== Smallholdings ==
Lamberton today consists largely of smallholdings compulsorily purchased, under an Act of Parliament, from the last Campbell-Renton laird, to provide a living for soldiers returning from The Great War. However, the land was not suited to crops, the holdings were too small for anything other than subsistence living, and today the original holdings are generally merged with others to make larger farms. Some modern house-building activity has taken place over the past decade along the original A1 (now bypassed). There is no town or village, as such, just scattered housing, with views over the North Sea.

== Foulden, Mordington and Lamberton Community Council ==
The regional authority today is the Scottish Borders Council, based some 40 miles (65 km) to the west at Newtown St. Boswells, Roxburghshire. Lamberton also returns three elected councillors to the Foulden Mordington & Lamberton Community Council, similar to an English parish council. Meetings between April 2020 and April 2021 were held on-line due to the COVID-19 pandemic. From May 2021, the Community Council has resumed face to face meetings with the community councillor team at Foulden Village Hall.

== See also ==
- Lamberton Skerrs
- Lambroughton or Lamberton - in North Ayrshire.
