= Tweedy John Todd =

English doctor (1789-1840)

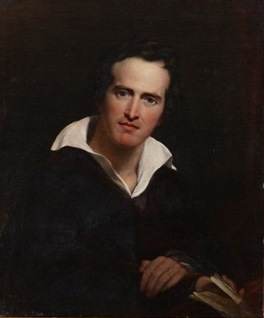
- Portrait of Tweedy John Todd by John Partridge
- Born: 1789; Berwick-Upon-Tweed
- Died: 4 August 1840 (aged 50–51); Hurst, West Sussex
- Citizenship: British
- Occupations: Naturalist; Doctor; Navy Surgeon

Tweedy John Todd (1789–1840) (also known as Tweedie John Todd, or John Tweedy Todd) was an English doctor, Royal Navy surgeon and naturalist who conducted early experimental work on healing and regeneration in animals.

== Biography ==
=== Early life ===
Tweedy John Todd was born in 1789 in Berwick-Upon-Tweed where his father was a borough treasurer. Todd studied medicine at the University of Edinburgh, but did not complete his degree, joining the Royal Navy instead in 1809.

=== Navy career ===
Todd began his career as a Royal Navy surgeon working in the Royal Naval Hospital at Plymouth. He later sailed to the East Indies and the Cape of Good Hope and was appointed surgeon on the flagship of Sir Robert Stopford aged only 23. While at the Cape of Good Hope aboard HMS Lion, he performed experiments on the Torpedo electric ray, which were published in the Philosophical Transactions of the Royal Society.

Todd retired from the navy in 1816, and lived in Italy for 6 or 7 years. Following this he returned to his studies and completed two medical degrees, first at the University of Montpellier, then at the University of Aberdeen before ultimately settling in Brighton in 1829, where he developed a medical practice.

=== Scientific work ===
While studying and then working as a physician in Brighton, Todd continued to publish papers on natural history, including work on fireflies in The Luminous Power of Some of the Lampyrides in 1827. In 1831 wrote The Book of Analysis. A New Method of Experience, in order to encourage physicians and scientists to apply the Baconian method of inductive reasoning to medicine and the other natural sciences.

Todd began experiments on healing using newts at the British Naval base in Naples, and continued when he moved to Brighton. He conducted a series of experiments on the newts and other animals such as worms to study the processes of healing and regeneration of wounds and amputated body parts. These were the first experiments that proved that nerves have a role in healing, and that amphibian limbs cannot regenerate if the nerves are cut. He observed the healing process microscopically and collaborated with histologist Charles Ager to produce over 3,000 microscope slides to illustrate his findings. These slides are amongst the earliest surviving examples of the use of Canada balsam as a mountant.

Todd's research was not well known in the second half of the 19th century, but was the basis of many studies in the early 20th century, and more recently the importance of Todd's work has been acknowledged by medical historians.

Todd died from tuberculosis on 4 August 1840, in Hurst, Sussex. He was aged 50 or 51. After his death his large collection of microscope slides came to the attention of Richard Owen, who was then the conservator of the Hunterian Museum at the Royal College of Surgeons in London, but would later become the first director of the Natural History Museum. Owen was impressed by the quality of the slides and in 1841 he purchased 1,500 of them for £150 (equivalent to £13,454 in 2025) to use in the teaching of surgeons. The slides are considered to be important in the history of medicine, histology and microscopy and they remain in the College's collection today.

== Published works ==
- Some Observations and Experiments Made on the Torpedo of the Cape of Good Hope in the Year 1812. John T. Todd Phil. Trans. R. Soc. Lond. 1816 106, 120-126, published 1 January 1816
- The Regeneration of Parts in the Aquatic Salamander Quarterly Journal of Science, Literature and Arts 1823
- The Luminous Power of Some of the Lampyrides 1827
- The Book of Analysis: Or, a New Method of Experience, Whereby the Induction of the Novum Organon [Of F. Bacon] Is Made Easy of Application, 1831, Published by John Murray, London
