= Marshall Meadows House =

Georgian mansion in Northumberland, England

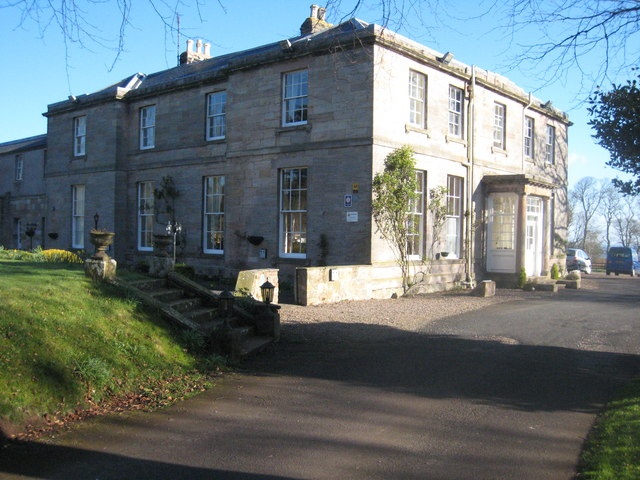

- Location within Northumberland

General information
- Location: Near Berwick-upon-Tweed, Northumberland, England
- Coordinates: 55°48′10″N 2°2′4″W
- Inaugurated: 18th century

Marshall Meadows House is a Georgian mansion and the most northerly hotel in England, located north of Berwick-upon-Tweed, Northumberland, in northeastern England. Currently trading as Marshall Meadows Manor House, the hotel is set in 15 acres (6.1 ha) of grounds only 275 metres (902 ft) from the border with Scotland.

== Early Residents ==
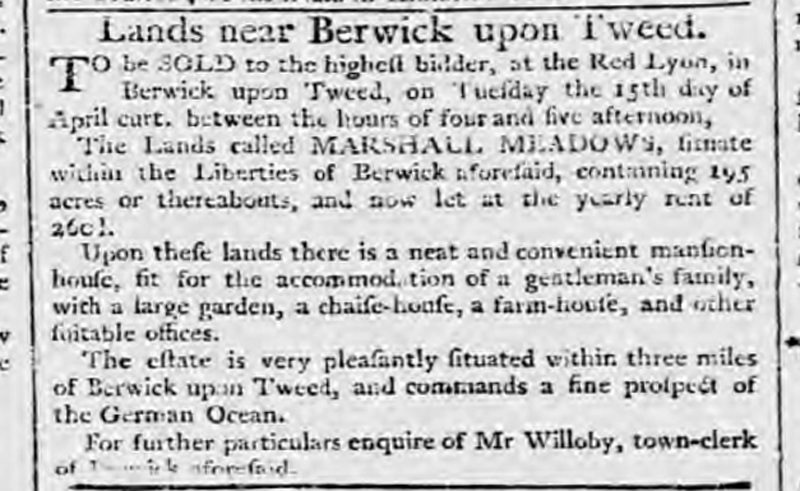
Ad in 1788

Marshall Meadows was built in 1780 by a wealthy merchant who spared no expense on the materials that went into its construction. The sandstone blocks were imported and the windows were very lavish. The identity of the builder of the house is not known but it seems that he did not live there long as in 1788 it was for sale. The advertisement is shown.

George Hogarth (1749-1832) was one of the earliest residents of the house. He is shown to be living here by 1799. He was a merchant owning a business called Hogarth and Company which traded in salmon fishery licences in Aberdeen. He also was the Deputy Lieutenant of Berwick-On-Tweed. He died in 1832 and his nephew David Murray became the owner of the house. His relative William Murray (1780-1851) inherited the house after his death. William died in 1851 and the house was advertised for sale in the newspaper (ad is shown at this reference).

== The Swanston family ==
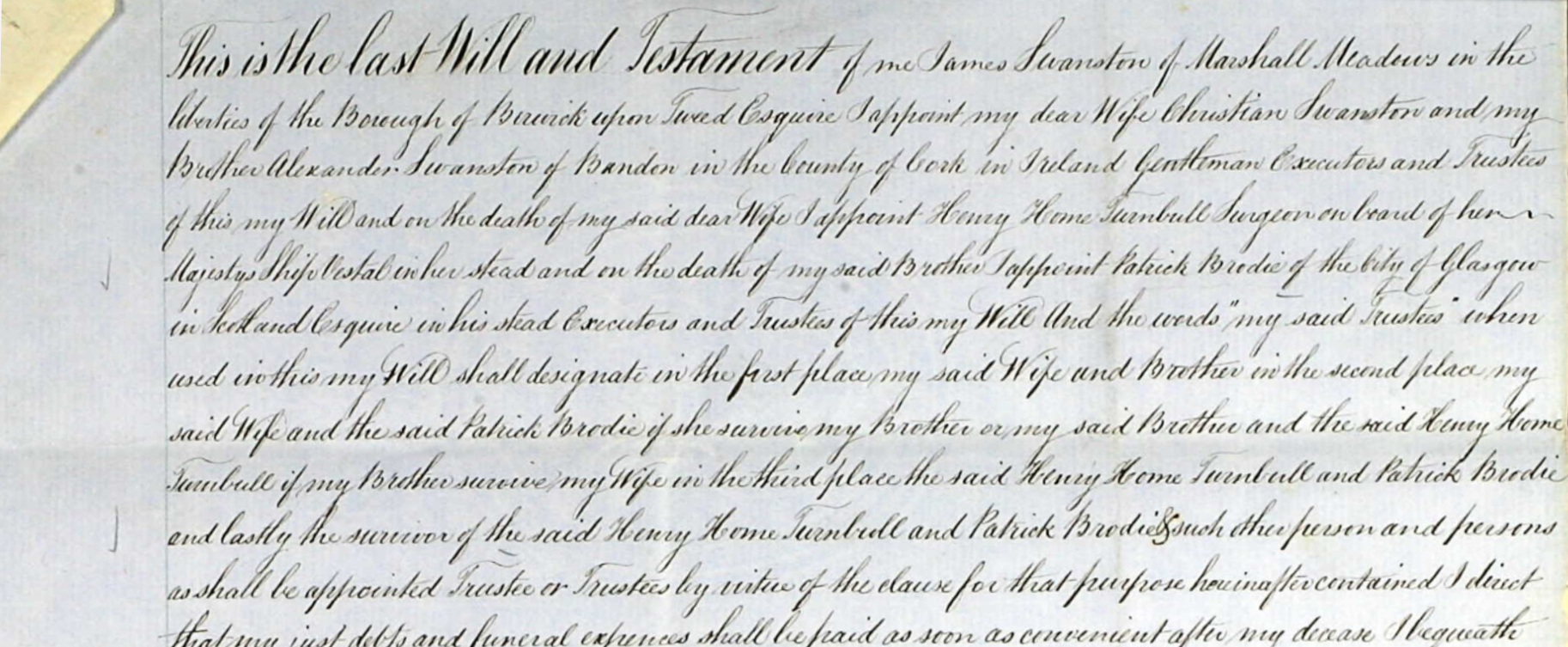
Part of the Will of James Swanston, 1855

The property was purchased by James Swanston (1798-1855) who was a merchant and Commission Agent in Riches Court in London. However, only three years later he died leaving his wife Christian Swanston (née Turnbull) a widow with seven young children. In his will he left Marshall Meadows to her for her lifetime and after that to his eldest son John Alexander Swanston.

Christian was born in Eyemouth, Berwickshire in 1813 and was only 42 when James died. He did however leave her well provided for. He was buried in Eyemouth Cemetery. She remained at Marshall Meadows with her children. Christian’s daughters were married at the house and the receptions were mentioned in the newspapers. One of her daughters, Catherine married a famous theologian Reverend Marcus Dods who is the subject of numerous books.

After Christian’s death in 1900 her son John Alexander Swanston owned Marshall Meadows. He died in 1918 and in 1925 it was purchased by Alderman Thomas Darling (1852-1932). Thomas was a businessman who was a partner in the firm Messrs Johnson and Darling and had several other connections to Banks and Associations. He was alderman of the Northumberland County Council for many years. In the 1950s Gordon B Ayre, his wife and family bought Marshall Meadows House, refurbished and modernised the house to make it their family home. They acquired Marshall Meadows House and set about the enormous task of converting this from a rather run down hospital to a spacious family home where the family were based for the next 30 years before retirement to Norham.

== Current Standings As A Hotel ==
Marshall Meadows Manor House is one of England's most northern hotels, featuring 27 bedrooms within the main hotel, along with dog-friendly pods with hot tubs situated within the 15 acres the manor house has to offer. Within the hotel, Marshall Meadows Restaurant 1782 offers a service which obtained an AA Rosette.

== See also ==
- Marshall Meadows Bay
