= Thomas Herriot =

Scottish cricketer and physician

Personal information
- Full name: Thomas Pearson Herriot
- Born: 11 May 1887; Berwick-upon-Tweed, Northumberland, England
- Died: 20 October 1949 (aged 62); Berwick-upon-Tweed, Northumberland, England
- Batting: Unknown

Domestic team information
- Years: Team
- 1911: Northumberland
- 1911: Scotland

Career statistics
Competition	First-class
Matches	1
Runs scored	80
Batting average	80.00
100s/50s	–/1
Top score	80
Catches/stumpings	1/–
- Source: Cricinfo, 28 October 2022

Thomas Pearson Herriot (11 May 1887 — 20 October 1949) was an English first-class cricketer and physician.

The son of David Herriot, he was born at Berwick-upon-Tweed in May 1887. He was educated in Edinburgh at Fettes College, before matriculating to the University of Edinburgh to study medicine. A club cricketer for Grange, Edinburgh University, and Berwick, Herriot made a single appearance in first-class cricket for Scotland against the touring Indians at Galashiels in 1911. He batted once in the match, with success, scoring 80 runs opening the batting in the Scottish first innings before being dismissed by Jehangir Warden. In the same season, he made a single appearance in minor counties cricket for Northumberland against Norfolk in the Minor Counties Championship at Newcastle-upon-Tyne.

Herriot served in the British Army during the First World War, being commissioned as a temporary lieutenant in Royal Army Medical Corps in February 1915, with promotion to temporary captain following in February 1916. From 1918 to 1919, he served in the Jullundur Brigade in British India, where he made observations about Spanish flu. Herriot relinquished his commission in October 1919, at which point he was made a full captain. He returned to Edinburgh, where he worked as a tuberculosis officer at the Edinburgh City Hospital. Herriot died suddenly at Berwick-upon-Tweed in October 1949.
