= Church of the Holy Trinity, Berwick-on-Tweed =

Church in Northumberland, England

Holy Trinity Church, Berwick-on-Tweed
- Holy Trinity Church, Berwick-on-Tweed
- Holy Trinity Church, Berwick-on-Tweed
- 55°46′19.04″N 2°0′2.2″W
- OS grid reference: NU 00030 53190
- Location: Parade, Berwick-upon-Tweed, Northumberland TD15 1DF
- Country: England
- Denomination: Church of England
- Website: Berwick Parish Church, Holy Trinity with St. Mary

History
- Dedication: Holy Trinity
- Consecrated: 1660

Administration
- Province: York
- Diocese: Newcastle
- Archdeaconry: Lindisfarne
- Deanery: Norham
- Parish: Berwick

Clergy
- Bishop: Right Revd Dr Helen-Ann Hartley

The Church of the Holy Trinity, Berwick-on-Tweed is a Church of England parish church in the centre of Berwick-upon-Tweed, Northumberland. It is a rare example of a church built in the Commonwealth era.

== History ==
In 1641, King Charles I gave money to replace the dilapidated old church in Berwick. In the following year, however, the Civil War began. Despite this, more money was collected and stone for building the church was taken from the old Berwick Castle. In 1650 John Young of Blackfriars, a London mason, was contracted to build the new church, and by 1652 the church was complete. This makes it one of the very few churches to have been built during the Commonwealth of England; other examples include Ninekirks, Holy Trinity, Staunton Harold and St Matthias Old Church in Poplar, London.

The design of the church is based on that of St Katharine Cree in London. It has a side aisle on each side of the nave, and the arcades are of the Tuscan order. The church was built with no chancel, altar, organ, tower or bells. However the church interior was surrounded by galleries on all four walls.

The church

In 1660, two years after the Restoration of the Monarchy, John Cosin, Bishop of Durham, consecrated the church. He demanded that a chancel should be built at the east end to accommodate a communion table. However, this was not done until 1855 when the present chancel was built and many original Gothic windows were redesigned in the Classical style. The 1855 west window is particularly fine and includes 16th- and 17th-century Flemish roundels formerly in the private chapel of the Duke of Buckingham at Canons Park, Middlesex. Contents include a pulpit thought to have been built for John Knox (1514-1572) during his stay in the town.

== Organ ==
Byfield and Green of London installed an organ in 1773, and Nicholson of Newcastle upon Tyne rebuilt it in 1855. In 1869 Harrison and Harrison rebuilt it again, repositioning the organ either side of the west window in the west gallery. In 1905 the north and south galleries were removed and Harrison and Harrison moved the organ to its present position in a specially-built organ chamber to the north of the chancel. In 1928 Ingrams thoroughly overhauled the organ. In the late 1970s the organist at that time attempted a restoration, but with disastrous results.

The organ continued in use until the early 2000s when the parish bought a Makin electronic organ as a stop-gap while funds were raised to restore the Harrison organ. In 2006 the organ restoration fund reached £50,000 and an Organ Restoration Group was formed to seek quotations from three restorers. The group took on Paul Ritchie, the former Diocesan Organ Advisor, as its advisor. The parish contracted Principal Pipe Organs of York to restore the organ, with the work due to start in 2010. The group undertook a fund raising campaign for £160,000 for the cost of complete restoration, and its future maintenance was vested in the Berwick Parish Church Trust. The restoration is now complete. The organ originally was a 3 manual and pedal organ but the restoration reduced this to a 2 manual and pedal organ. As the civic church of Berwick Upon Tweed many see this as a missed opportunity to fully restore the 3 manual organ. The pipework of the choir organ was mostly not original and, sadly, was felt not to be worthy of restoration - a shame as the church commands a larger 3 manual and pedal organ.

== Current use ==
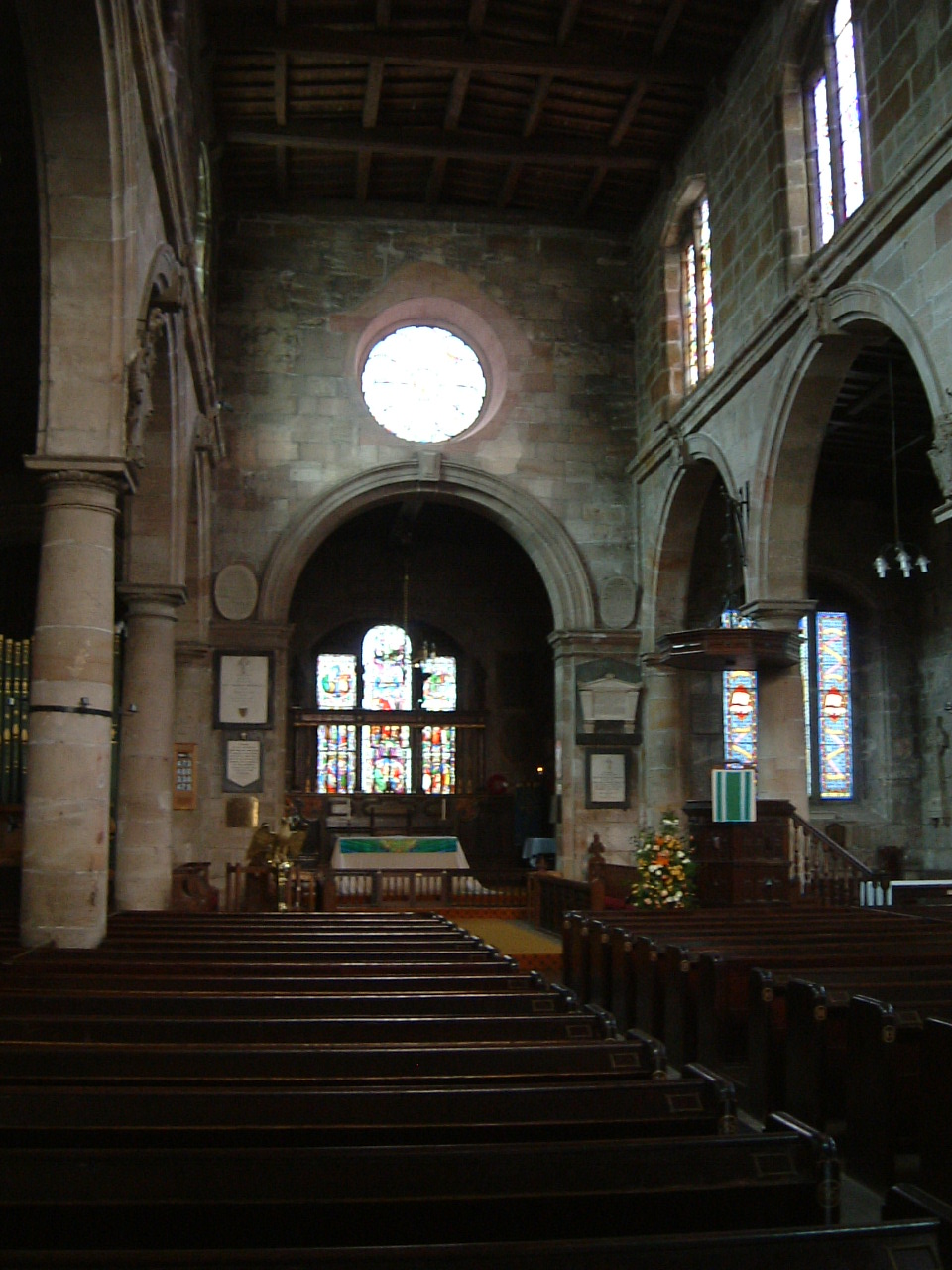
Inside the nave, looking east to the 19th-century chancel

The church is used for worship, concerts, recitals, lectures and other community functions. The parish centre is available to the community and is used extensively for meetings and social events. The wooded old churchyard is a natural nature reserve.

There are two small turrets at the west end of the building. One of these turrets houses a single bell which is used to summon worshipers to the church.

Its churchyard was the main cemetery for the town until around the 1860s, when there was no room for any more interments. Berwick and its southern neighbour Tweedmouth now have their own cemeteries.
