= W. H. Paxton =

Australian business merchant (1844–1887)

William Henry Paxton (c. 1844 – 19 August 1887) was a prominent businessman in the early days of Mackay, Queensland.

He was born in about 1844 in Berwick, Northumberland to Thomas Paxton and Mary Louisa Pease. Little is known of his earliest days in Australia, but he arrived in Mackay in 1874 as assistant to Robert Jonathan Jeffray of Wm. Sloan and Co., a Melbourne merchant house.

In 1876, he took over the store of sugar grower Arthur Kemmis and expanded the business as merchant and shipping agent, with close links to the Australasian United Steam Navigation Company. A notable employee from 1881 was James Croker (23 April 1851 – 27 April 1927), who later formed his own business shipping virtually all of the sugar from Mackay. Around 1885, E. V. Reid joined as partner of Paxton & Co. They opened offices in Brisbane and Sydney. Their business flourished until being taken over by McIlwraith & McEachran, which later merged with Adelaide Steamship Company. The imposing company warehouse still exists on the waterfront and is a tourist drawcard.

== Jabberwock and Borough Belle ==
One source, difficult to substantiate, asserts that Paxton owned two ships, the steam schooners Jabberwock and Borough Belle (under captains Hugh Adrian and Robert J. Belbin) which were engaged in the labour recruiting business, now reviled as "blackbirding".

Jabberwock, an auxiliary steam screw three-masted schooner, of 87 tons register, was built by D. Macquarie at Millers Point in 1875. She immediately began carrying freight and passengers between Sydney, Brisbane Townsville, Cooktown and Maryborough with Moodie and Monro the Sydney agents and Quinlan & Co. in Brisbane. Her master in 1876 was G. Stable and was put up at auction in 1876, but may not have changed hands. In 1878 it was back on the market She was later advertised for sale as "specially suited for the South Sea Island labor trade" but continued carrying freight along the east coast. Her next master was A. White and John M. Brydon the Brisbane agent. In 1880 she collided with a river steamer "Redbank" in the Brisbane River; captain White was found partly culpable. She was fitted with berths that same year and (having previously been converted to steam operation) the S.S. Jabberwock began the Islander labour trade by returning labourers who had completed their contract. The trade was not trouble-free. The Jabberwock boats were fired on by residents of Tanna, and almost the entire crew of another ship, the "Borealis" were massacred at Malayta. With rising demand for labour from Fiji and Samoa as well as Queensland, and a growing realisation of the true nature of the contracts, the thirty-odd ships engaged in the trade were returning half full. In 1882??? "Jabberwock" was first advertised jointly with the "Borough Belle", skippered by Belbin. A Mr Hodgson was one of the owners in 1884 The Jabberwock was wrecked on an island in the Torres Strait on 23 May 1884.

Borough Belle, a clipper-schooner of 210 tons register built at Banfield's yard, Sydney, started on the Sydney to Melbourne run in 1875 under Captain Samuel Craig, who was also her owner. C. B. Bond was the Sydney agent. She was soon plying the east coast around to Darwin and carrying sugar to Adelaide. J. Dunn was master from 1877. In 1878 she was offered for sale, together with the "Mary Peverley". She joined the Islander labour transportation fleet in 1881 R. J. Belbin became master 1882. He was one of those fired on at Ambrym after accusations of them taking a native against his will. He made it back to the ship but died 4 July 1883 shortly after giving the order to return to Mackay. Her next master was captain John Williams. The "Borough Belle" was advertised for sale in 1891, the owners being named as the Mackay Labour Company. She was wrecked on the Bellona Shoals and deliberately beached by Williams during a storm in the Coral Sea on 29 January 1894. She limped to Mackay with no loss of life. Williams was cleared of any blame and was later a respected captain for Burns, Philp & Co.

== Other interests ==
Paxton was a director of the Mount Orange Copper Mining Company and a shareholder in the Mount Britton Goldfield Company.

He was elected as the 7th mayor of Mackay, a position he held for several years.

He married Mary Ann Cross (1858–1889) on 1 November 1876. They returned to England in 1884, intending to live in Wales, but returned to Australia two years later, moving to 59 William St. Collingwood, where he died.

== Sources ==
- William Henry Paxton Mackay Family History Society (2009)
