= Berwick-upon-Tweed =

Town and civil parish in Northumberland, England

Coordinates: 55°46′09″N 02°00′09″W

- Town
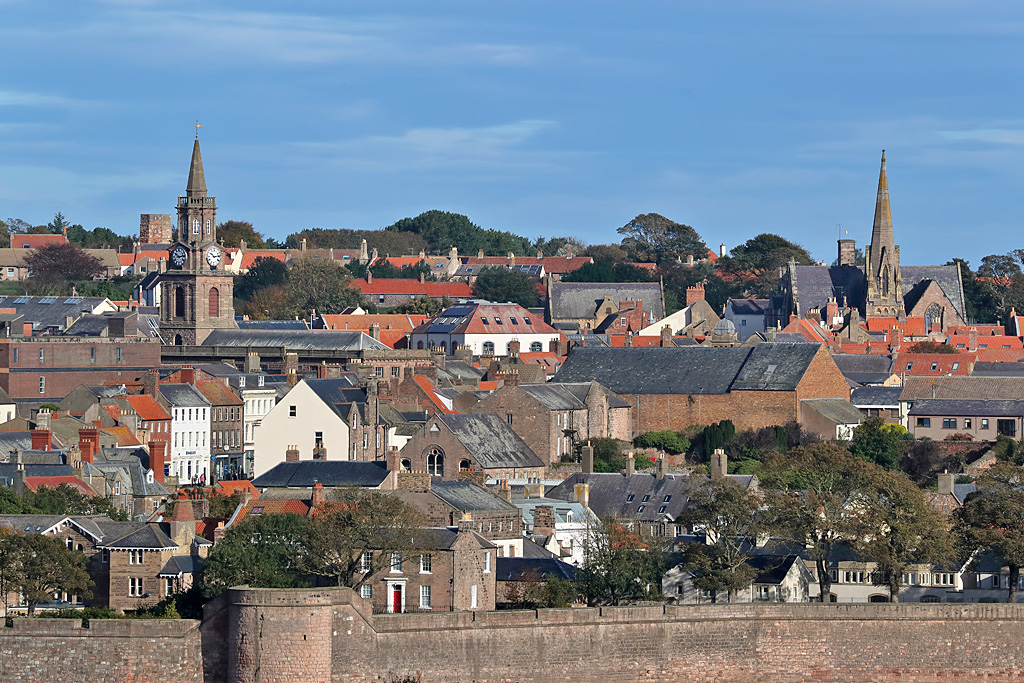
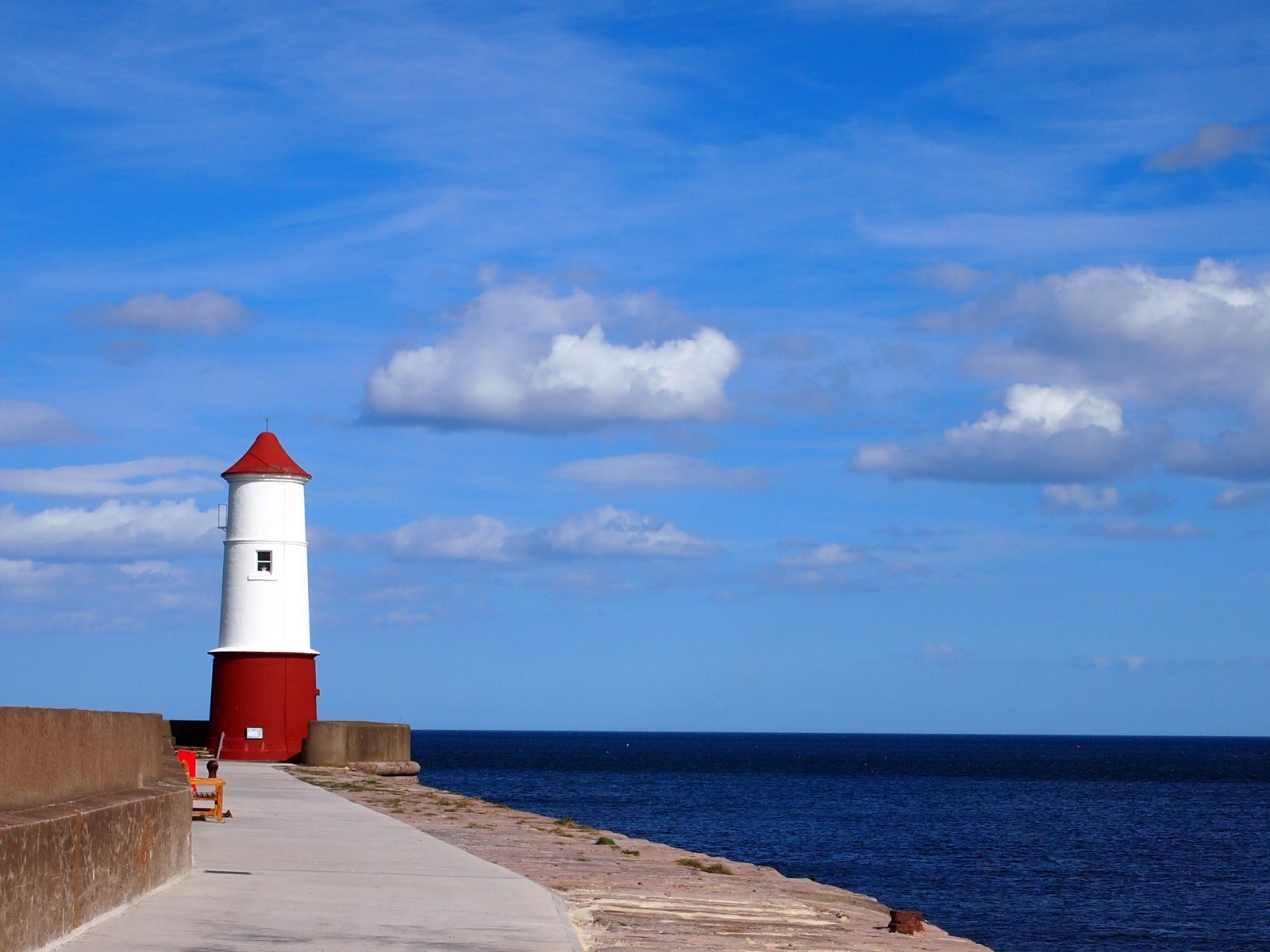
- Town centre Marygate, the main street of the old town Berwick Lighthouse

- Location within Northumberland
- Population: 12,043 (2011 Census)
- OS grid reference: NT995525
  - London: 304 mi (489 km)
- Civil parish: Berwick-upon-Tweed
- Unitary authority: Northumberland
- Ceremonial county: Northumberland
- Region: North East
- Country: England
- Sovereign state: United Kingdom
- Post town: BERWICK-UPON-TWEED
- Postcode district: TD15
- Dialling code: 01289
- Police: Northumbria
- Fire: Northumberland
- Ambulance: North East
- UK Parliament: North Northumberland
- Website: Berwick-upon-Tweed Town Council

Berwick-upon-Tweed (/ˈbɛrɪk/), sometimes known as Berwick-on-Tweed or simply Berwick, is a town and civil parish in Northumberland, England. It lies 2.5 mi (4 km) south of the Anglo-Scottish border and is the northernmost town in England. (Note: The smaller hamlet of Marshall Meadows is the actual northernmost settlement of any kind in England.) The 2011 census recorded Berwick's population as 12,043.

The town is at the mouth of the River Tweed on the east coast, 56 mi (90 km) south-east of Edinburgh, 65 mi (105 km) north of Newcastle upon Tyne and 345 mi (555 km) north of London. Uniquely for England, the town is slightly further north than Denmark's capital Copenhagen and the southern tip of Sweden, further east of the North Sea, which Berwick borders.

Berwick was founded as an Anglo-Saxon settlement in the Kingdom of Northumbria, which was annexed by England in the 10th century. A civil parish and town council were formed in 2008 comprising the communities of Berwick, Spittal and Tweedmouth. It is the northernmost civil parish in England.

For more than 400 years, the area was central to historic border wars between the Kingdoms of England and Scotland, and several times possession of Berwick changed hands between the two kingdoms. The last time it changed hands was when Richard, Duke of Gloucester (later King Richard III) retook it for England in 1482. To this day, many Berwickers feel a close affinity to Scotland. Both Berwick Rangers Football Club and Berwick Rugby Football Club play in Scottish leagues.

Berwick remains a traditional market town and also has some notable architectural features, in particular its medieval town walls, its Georgian Town Hall, its Elizabethan ramparts, and Britain's earliest barracks buildings, which Nicholas Hawksmoor built (1717–1721) for the Board of Ordnance.

== Toponymy ==
Berwick's name is of the same origin as the word berewick, denoting a portion of farmland that was detached from a manor and reserved for a lord's own use. This comes from the Old English berewíc, meaning "corn farm" (more specifically, bere refers to barley). The earliest recorded spelling, Berewich, dates from 1167. There are several places in Britain with the same name; one such is North Berwick in Scotland, and Berwick-upon-Tweed has also been called "South Berwick" in Scottish sources. The medieval seal of the town showed a bear and a wych tree as a pun on the name.

== History ==
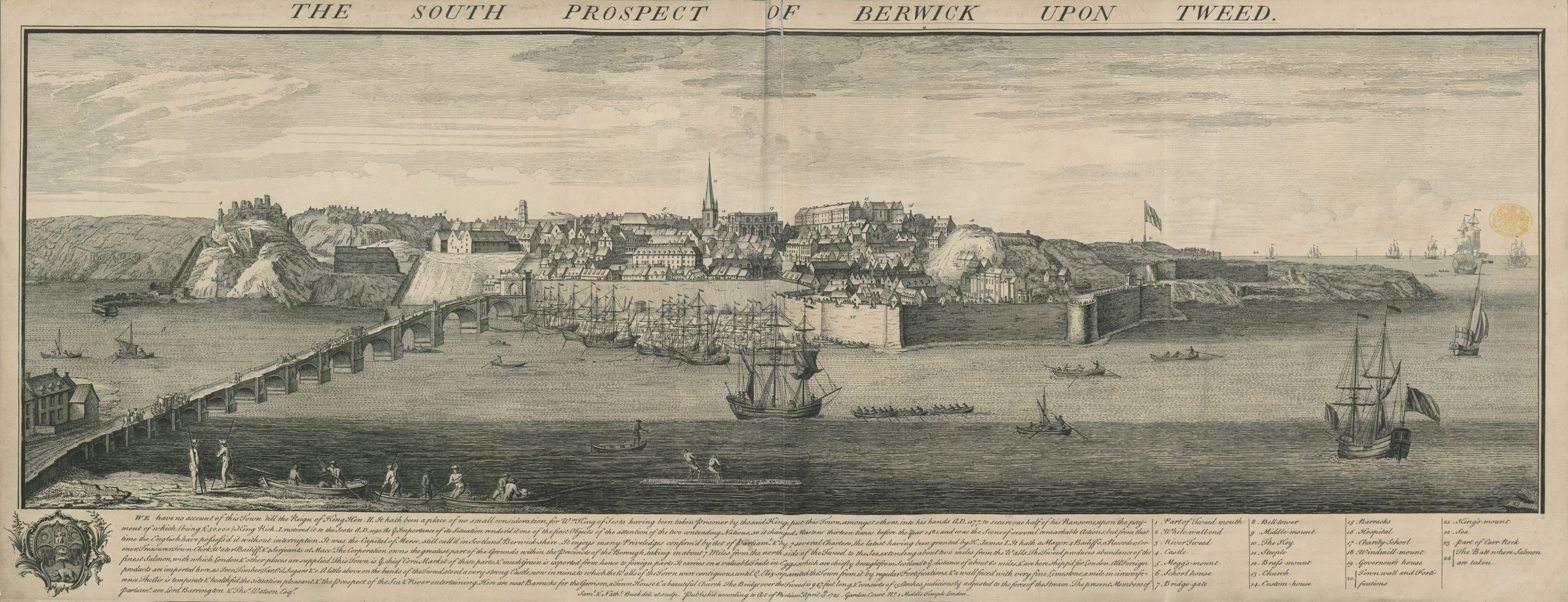
Berwick in 1745

=== Early history ===
In the post-Roman period, the area was inhabited by the Brythons of Bryneich. Later, the region became part of the Anglian kingdom of Bernicia. Bernicia later united with the kingdom of Deira to form Northumbria, which in the mid-10th century entered the Kingdom of England under Eadred.

Berwick remained part of the Earldom of Northumbria until control passed to the Scots following the Battle of Carham of 1018. The town itself was founded as an Anglo-Saxon settlement during the time of the Kingdom of Northumbria.

=== Scottish burgh ===
Between the late 10th and early 11th centuries, the land between the rivers Forth and Tweed came under Scottish control, either through conquest by Scotland or through cession by England. Berwick was made a royal burgh by David I (reigned 1124–1153). David also established many of the shires of Scotland, with Berwick becoming the county town of Berwickshire, which covered the town and a largely rural area to the north-west of it. A mint was present in the town by 1153. In 1276, William de Baddeby was Constable of Berwick.

While under Scottish control, Berwick was referred to as "South Berwick" to differentiate it from the town of North Berwick, East Lothian, near Edinburgh.

Berwick had a medieval hospital for the sick and poor, which the Church administered. A charter under the Great Seal of Scotland, confirmed by King James I of Scotland, grants the king's chaplain "Thomas Lauder of the House of God or Hospital lying in the burgh of Berwick-upon-Tweed, to be held to him for the whole time of his life with all lands, teinds, rents and profits, etc., belonging to the said hospital, as freely as is granted to any other hospital in the Kingdom of Scotland; the king also commands all those concerned to pay to the grantee all things necessary for the support of the hospital. Dated at Edinburgh 8 June, in the 20th year of his reign."

=== Disputed territory ===
Berwick's strategic position on the Anglo-Scottish border during centuries of war between the two nations and its relatively great wealth led to a succession of raids, sieges and takeovers. William I of Scotland invaded and attempted to capture northern England in 1173–74. After his defeat in 1174, Berwick was ceded to Henry II of England under the Treaty of Falaise, along with four other castles at Edinburgh, Jedburgh, Roxburgh and Stirling, with the five castles to be garrisoned with English troops paid for at Scottish expense. The Treaty of Falaise was annulled in 1189 when William paid Richard I of England 10,000 marks sterling to contribute towards the latter's crusade.

Berwick had become a prosperous town by the middle of the 13th century. According to William Edington, a bishop and chancellor of England, Berwick was "so populous and of such commercial importance that it might rightly be called another Alexandria, whose riches were the sea and the water its walls".

In 1291–92, Berwick was the site of Edward I of England's arbitration in the contest for the Scottish crown between John Balliol and Robert Bruce, 5th Lord of Annandale. The decision in favour of Balliol was pronounced in the Great Hall of Berwick Castle on 17 November 1292.

Part of the town walls

In 1296, England went to war with France, with which Scotland was in alliance. Balliol invaded England in response, sacking Cumberland. Edward, in turn, invaded Scotland and captured Berwick on 30 March 1296, destroying much of the town and massacring the burgesses, merchants and artisans of the town.

Edward I went again to Berwick in August 1296 to receive formal homage from some 2,000 Scottish nobles, after defeating the Scots at the Battle of Dunbar in April and forcing John Balliol to abdicate at Kincardine Castle the following July. At this time, work began on building the town walls (and rebuilding the earlier Castle); these fortifications were complete by 1318 and subsequently improved under Scottish rule. An arm of William Wallace was displayed at Berwick, after his execution and quartering on 23 August 1305.

In 1314, Edward II of England mustered 25,000 men at Berwick, who later fought in the crushing defeat at the Battle of Bannockburn. Between 1315 and 1318, Scottish armies, sometimes with the help of Flemish and German privateers, besieged and blockaded the town, finally capturing it in April 1318.

England retook Berwick the day after the Battle of Halidon Hill in 1333. The Scots briefly took control of the town of Berwick (but not its castle) after a siege in November 1355, but were in turn besieged by the English, who retook the town in January 1356. In October 1357, a treaty was signed at Berwick by which the Scottish estates undertook to pay 100,000 marks as a ransom for David II of Scotland, who had been taken prisoner at the Battle of Neville's Cross on 17 October 1346. In 1378, Henry Percy, 1st Earl of Northumberland besieged and took Berwick-on-Tweed. In 1461, Berwick was ceded back to Scotland by Margaret of Anjou on behalf of her husband, Henry VI, in return for help against the Yorkists during the Wars of the Roses.

Robert Lauder of Edrington was put in charge of the castle. He was succeeded in 1474 by David, Earl of Crawford. On 3 February 1478, Robert Lauder of the Bass and Edrington was again appointed Keeper of the castle, a position that he held until the final year of Scottish control, when Patrick Hepburn, 1st Lord Hailes, had possession.

In 1482, Richard, Duke of Gloucester (later Richard III) recaptured the town. Thomas Gower (fl. 1543–1577) was the English marshal of Berwick 1543–1552. The Scots did not accept this conquest evidenced by innumerable charters for at least two centuries after this date, but never regained control of the town. Over a little more than 400 years, Berwick had changed hands more than a dozen times.

=== English town ===
The ramparts

Much of southern Scotland was again invaded by England during the "Rough Wooing" (also known as the Eight Years' War) of 1543–1551. The war ended with the Treaty of Norham in 1551, which saw England withdraw back to the border as had existed before the war began, and so retaining Berwick. Under the treaty, Berwick was declared to be a free town, independent of either kingdom. In practice it was controlled by England and sent members of parliament to the English parliament, but as an independent borough, outside the authority of the sheriffs of any English county, similar to a county corporate.

During the reign of Queen Elizabeth I of England, vast sums – one source reports "£128,648, the most expensive undertaking of the Elizabethan period" – were spent on its fortifications, in a new Italian style (trace italienne), designed both to withstand artillery and to facilitate its use from within the fortifications. These fortifications have been described as "the only surviving walls of their kind". Sir Richard Lee designed some of the Elizabethan works, and the Italian military engineer Giovanni Portinari was also involved in the project.

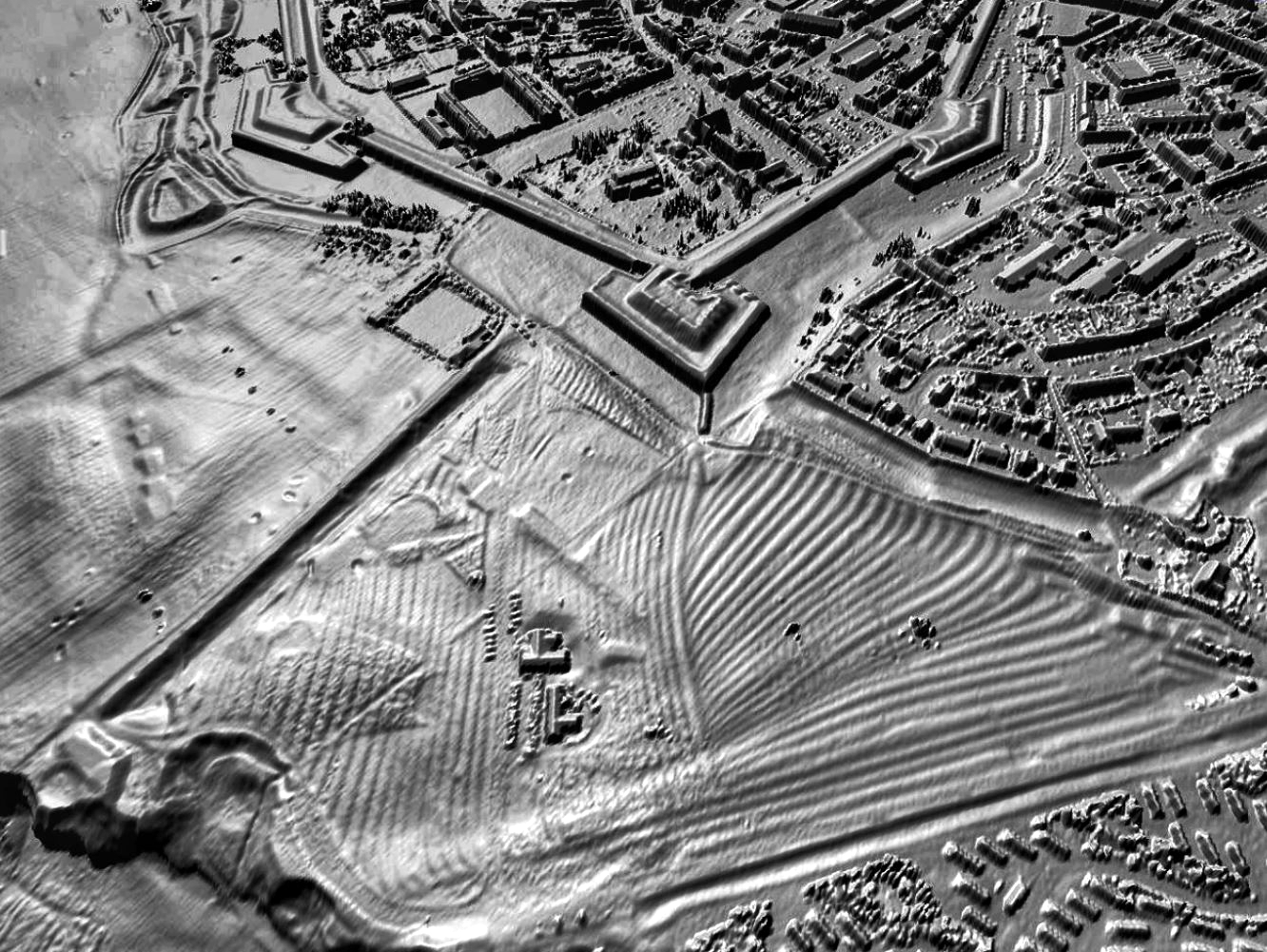
A lidar over the ridge and furrow of Magdalene Fields, to the northern fortifications of the town

Berwick's role as a border fortress town ended with England and Scotland's Union of the Crowns. On 6 April 1603, James VI of Scotland crossed the Border on his journey southwards to be crowned James I of England. He was met at Lamberton by the Lord Governor of Berwick with a mounted party from the garrison and was conducted into the town. In December 1603, the Crown ordered the dissolution of the garrison of Berwick and the number of soldiers was reduced to 100 men and pensioners.

In 1639, the army of Charles I faced that of General Alexander Leslie at Berwick in the Bishops' Wars, which were concerned with bringing the Presbyterian Church of Scotland under Charles's control. The two sides did not fight, but negotiated the Pacification of Berwick.

Berwick Bridge, also known as the "Old Bridge" dates to 1611. It linked Islandshire on the south bank of the River Tweed with the county burgh of Berwick on the north bank. Holy Trinity Church was built in 1648–52. It is the most northerly parish church in England and was built under special licence from Oliver Cromwell during the Commonwealth period.

=== British town ===
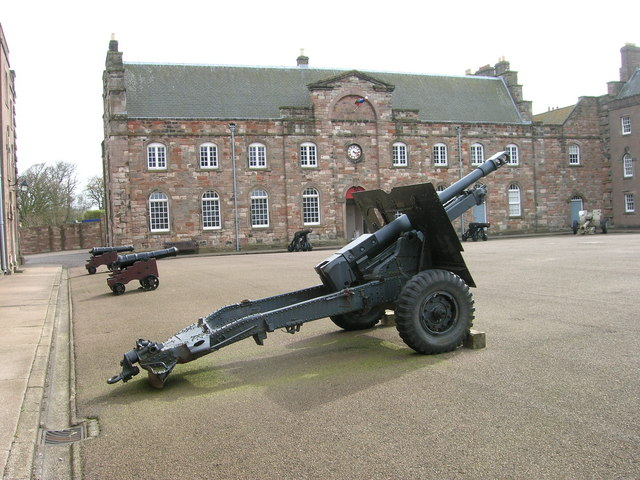
The Barracks (1717–1721)

In 1707, the Act of Union united England and Scotland to create the Kingdom of Great Britain. Since then, Berwick has remained within the laws and legal system of England and Wales. The Wales and Berwick Act 1746 (since repealed) deemed that whenever legislation referred to England, it applied to Berwick without the need for a specific reference to the town.

Until the 1830s, the borough boundaries of the town were identical to the parish of Berwick, which lay entirely on the north side of the River Tweed, covering the main part of the built-up area and the rural areas immediately north-west of it. By that time, Tweedmouth on the south side of the river had grown to a sizeable population, effectively as a suburb of the town but outside the borough boundaries. Under the Parliamentary Boundaries Act 1832 the parliamentary borough (constituency) of Berwick was enlarged to include the townships of Tweedmouth and Spittal south of the Tweed. Three years later, the Municipal Corporations Act 1835 standardised how boroughs were governed across England and Wales, and Berwick's municipal boundaries were enlarged to match the parliamentary borough, bringing Tweedmouth and Spittal under the jurisdiction of Berwick's town council. The same act also formalised Berwick's status as an independent county corporate. The population of the borough in 1841 was 12,578, and that of the parish was 8,484.

In the 1840s, Samuel Lewis included similar entries for Berwick-upon-Tweed in both his England and Scotland Topographical Dictionary.

Berwick remained a county in its own right, and remained a separate parliamentary constituency until 1885 when it was merged to become a division of Northumberland under the Redistribution of Seats Act 1885. In 1889 elected county councils were established under the Local Government Act 1888, which were based on the parliamentary boundaries of counties, and so Berwick was brought under the jurisdiction of Northumberland County Council, with the town council thereafter being a lower-tier authority subordinate to the county council.

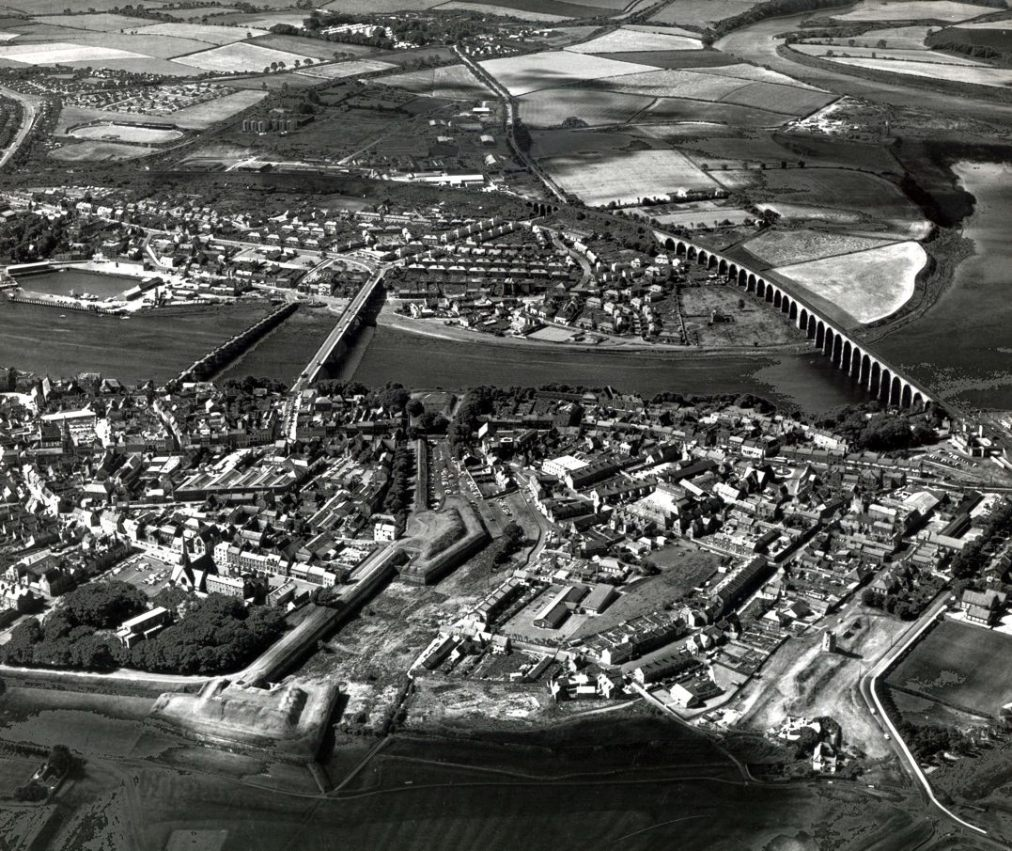
Berwick in 1972

England now is officially defined as "subject to any alteration of boundaries under Part IV of the Local Government Act 1972, the area consisting of the counties established by section 1 of that Act, Greater London and the Isles of Scilly", which thus includes Berwick. In the 1972 act's reorganisation of English local government from 1 April 1974, the Borough of Berwick-upon-Tweed was created by the merger of the previous borough of Berwick-upon-Tweed with Belford Rural District, Glendale Rural District and Norham and Islandshires Rural District.

The Interpretation Act 1978 provides that in legislation passed between 1967 and 1974, "a reference to England includes Berwick upon Tweed and Monmouthshire."

In 2009, the Borough of Berwick-upon-Tweed was abolished as part of wider structural changes to local government in England. All functions previously exercised by Berwick Borough Council were transferred to Northumberland County Council, which is the unitary authority for the area.

== Governance ==
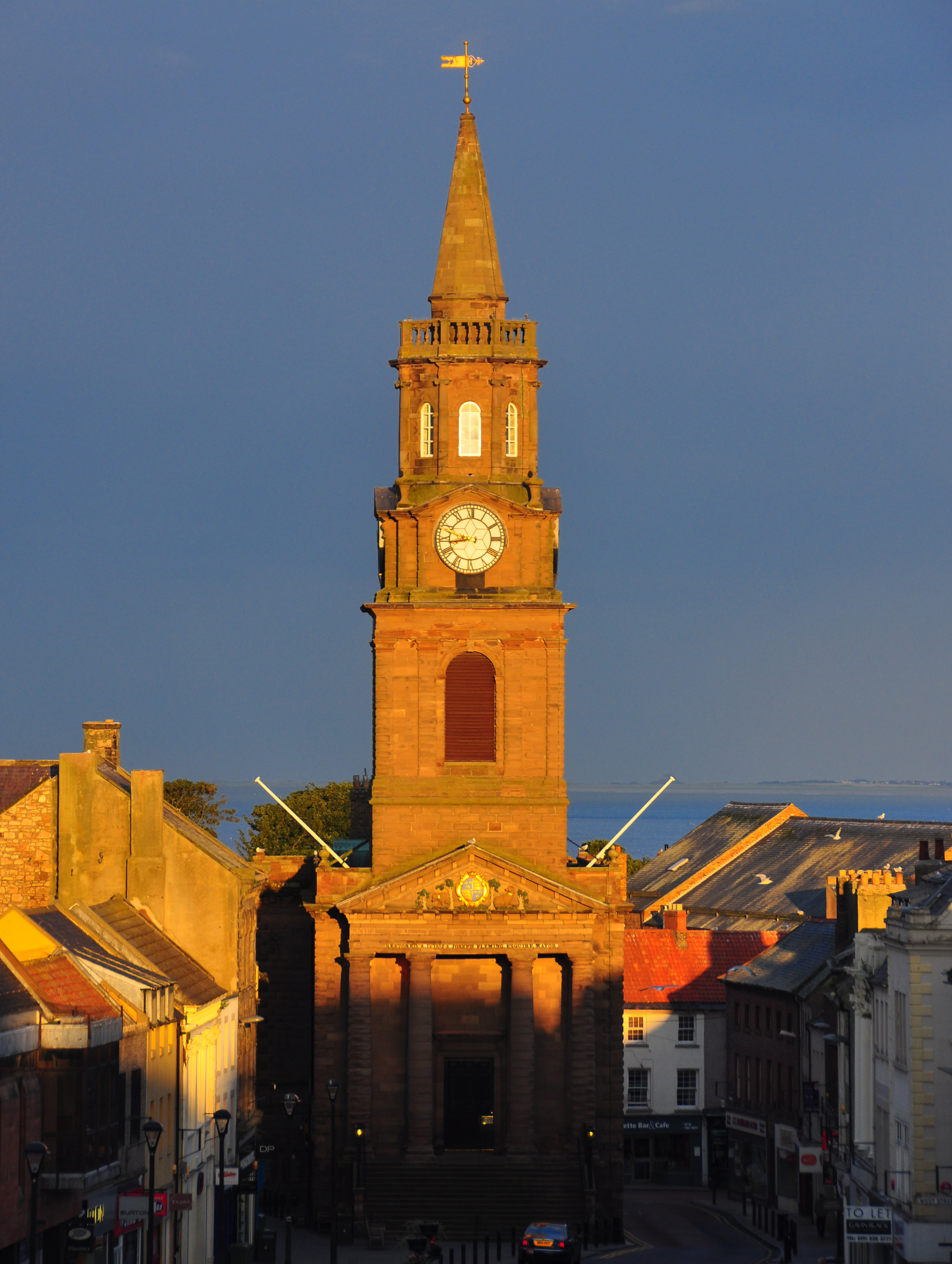
Berwick Town Hall, built 1754–1760

Location of Berwick-upon-Tweed civil parish in Northumberland, governed by the Berwick-upon-Tweed Town Council

During periods of Scottish administration, Berwick was the county town of Berwickshire, to which the town gave its name. Thus at various points in the Middle Ages and from 1482 (when Berwick became administered by England), Berwickshire had the unique distinction of being the only county in the British Isles to be named after a town in another country.

Coat of arms of the Berwick-Upon-Tweed Borough Council from 1958 until 1974.

In 1958, the borough's council applied for a coat of arms, but applied to the Lord Lyon King of Arms, the Scottish heraldic authority, for the grant "as suitable to a Burgh of Scotland", which was duly granted.

On 1 April 1974, the borough was merged with Belford Rural District, Glendale Rural District and Norham and Islandshires Rural District to form Berwick Borough Council.

Northumberland County Council became the unitary authority for the area when the Borough of Berwick-upon-Tweed was abolished on 1 April 2009.

A new Berwick-upon-Tweed Town Council was created on 1 April 2008 covering Berwick-upon-Tweed, Tweedmouth and Spittal. It has taken over the former Borough's mayoralty and regalia. The mayor for 2025-2026 is John Robertson.

Berwick-upon-Tweed is in the parliamentary constituency of North Northumberland.

== Economy ==
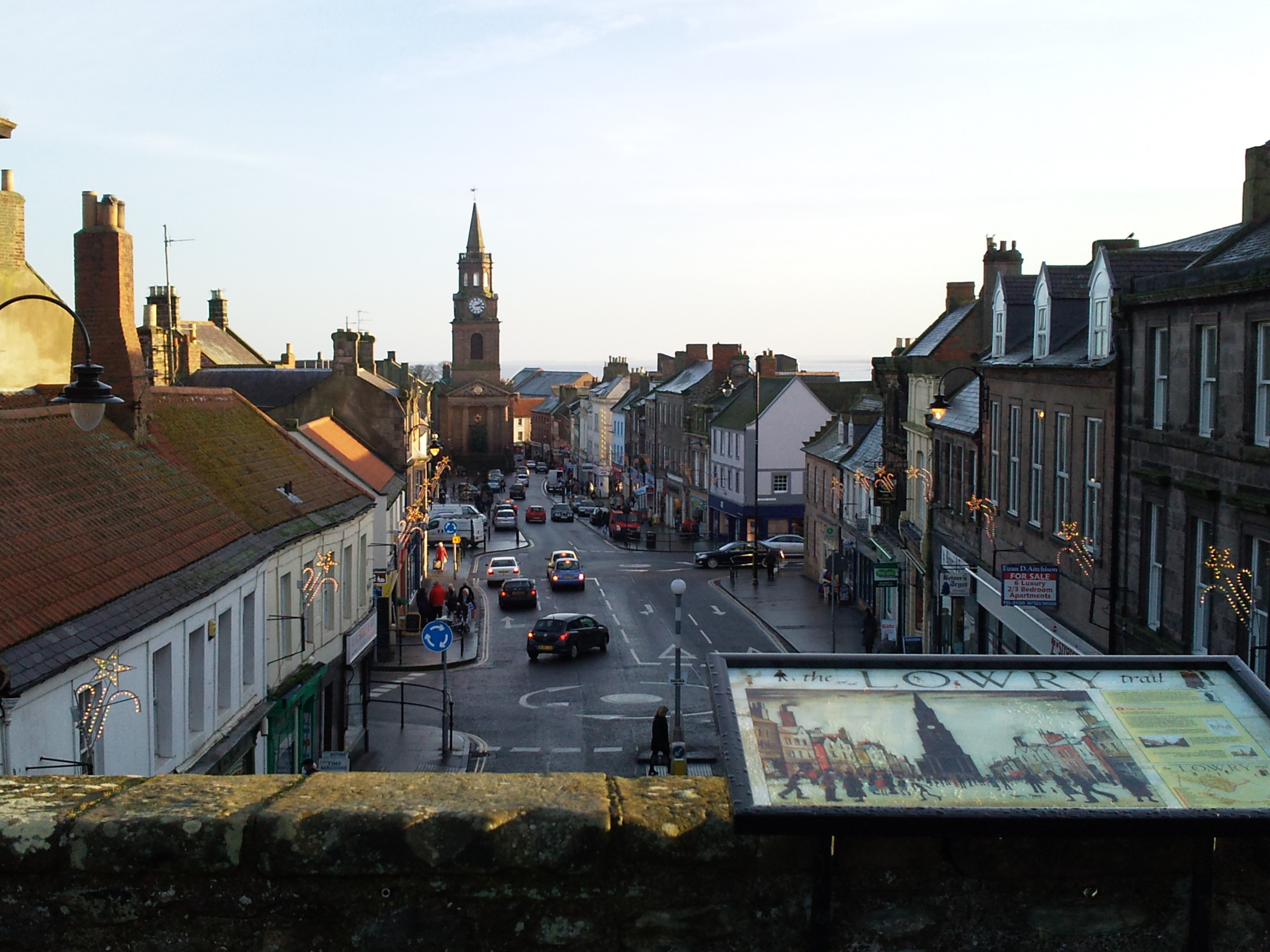
The High Street

Slightly more than 60% of the population is employed in the service sector, including shops, hotels and catering, financial services and most government activity, including health care. Some current and recent Berwick economic activities include salmon fishing, shipbuilding, engineering, sawmilling, fertilizer production, malting and the manufacture of tweed and hosiery.

Berwick town centre comprises the Mary Gate and High Street where many local shops and some retail chains exist. New office development has been built in the Walker Gate beside the library, which combined space with the Northumberland Adult Learning Centre and Tourism centre.

There is a retail park in Tweedmouth consisting of several retailers. The borough council refused a proposal from Asda in 2006 to build a store near the site, but gave Tesco planning permission for its new store in the town in 2008.

== Education ==
As with the rest of Northumberland, schools in Berwick have historically used the three-tier system; however, the Berwick Partnership of schools is set to transition into a two-tier system as of September 2025, with Northumberland County Council investing £50 million into the project which will include an entirely new building for Berwick Academy. Pupils may also commute across the Scottish border to Eyemouth or Berwickshire to attend secondary school.

Primary schools:

- Berwick St Mary C of E
- Holy Island C of E
- Holy Trinity C of E
- Hugh Joicey C of E
- Lowick
- Norham St Ceolwulfs C of E
- Scremerston
- Spittal Community School
- St Cuthbert's RC
- Tweedmouth Prior Park
- Tweedmouth West.

High schools:

- Berwick Academy.

Independent schools:

- Longridge Towers School (co-ed, all ages).

Special schools:

- The Grove School.

== Transport ==
TransPennine Express British Rail Class 802 passes over the Royal Border Bridge on the East Coast Main Line

Berwick-upon-Tweed railway station lies on the East Coast Main Line. It is served by three train operating companies:

- CrossCountry: for services between Edinburgh Waverley and Plymouth, via Birmingham New Street
- London North Eastern Railway: for services between Edinburgh Waverley and London King's Cross, via York
- TransPennine Express: for services between Edinburgh Waverley and Newcastle.

Bus services are mostly operated by Borders Buses and Arriva Northumbria providing services to Newcastle, Alnwick, Galashiels, Kelso and Edinburgh. The town is also served by a National Express route between Glasgow and London.

The old A1 road passes through Berwick; the route now bypasses the town to the west.

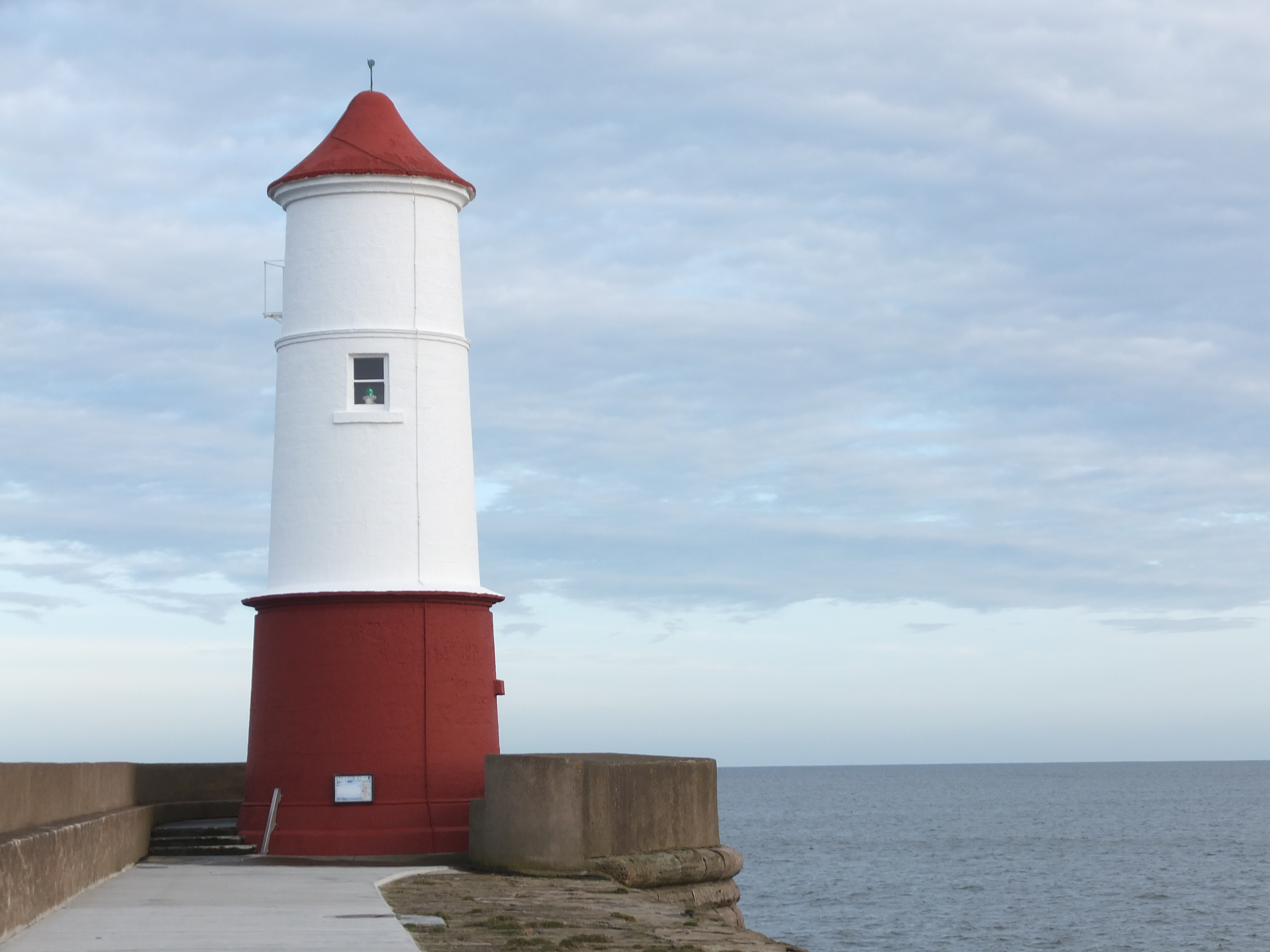
Berwick breakwater lighthouse

A small seaport at Tweedmouth facilitates the import and export of goods, but provides no passenger services. The port is protected by a long breakwater built in the 19th century, at the end of which is a red and white lighthouse. Completed in 1826, the 13 m (43 ft) tower emits a white light every five seconds from a window overlooking the sea. Seafarers' charity Apostleship of the Sea has a chaplain to support the needs of mariners arriving at the port.

== Landmarks ==
The Royal Border Bridge

- Berwick Castle was built in the 13th century and rebuilt in the 1290s. It was in disrepair by the 17th century and much of it was demolished in the 19th century to make way for the railway. However, substantial ruins remain just outside the town's rampart walls to the west by the river.
- Berwick town walls and Tudor ramparts are some of the country's finest remaining examples of their type.
- The Old Bridge, 15-span sandstone arch bridge 355 m (1,164 ft) long, built in 1610–1624 for £15,000. The bridge continues to carry road traffic, but in one direction only. The bridge, part of the Great North Road from London to Edinburgh was built by order of James VI and I.

Holy Trinity Parish Church

- Holy Trinity Parish Church, unusual for having been built during the Commonwealth of England. It was built in 1648–1652 with stone from the 13th-century castle. It was originally a plain "preaching box", with no steeple, stained glass or other decorations. Contents include a pulpit thought to have been built for John Knox during his stay in the town. The church was much altered in 1855 with many new windows and the addition of a chancel.
- Berwick Barracks, built 1717–1721, the design attributed to Nicholas Hawksmoor.
- Berwick Town Hall, designed by S&J Worrell and built in 1754–1760. The building is neoclassical, and originally the town's prison was on the top floor. The tower above the council chamber has a ring of eight bells and a curfew bell. Lester and Pack of the Whitechapel Bell Foundry cast the tenor, third, fourth and treble bells in 1754 and the fifth and sixth bells in 1759. Charles Carr of Smethwick cast the second and curfew bells in 1894. Mears and Stainbank of the Whitechapel Bell Foundry cast the seventh bell in 1901.
- Dewars Lane Granary, built in 1769, now restored as a hotel and art gallery.
- Marshall Meadows House, built in 1780 as a country house, is north of the town. It is the most northern hotel in England, just 275 metres from the Scottish border at Marshall Meadows Bay.
- Union Chain Bridge, 5 mi (8 km) upstream, from Berwick, was built in 1821 and is the world's oldest surviving suspension bridge.
- The Kings Arms Hotel on Hide Hill was built in 1782 and rebuilt in 1845. Charles Dickens stayed there in 1861.
- The Royal Border Bridge, designed by Robert Stephenson and built in 1847–1850 at a cost of £253,000, is a 720 yards (660 m)-long railway viaduct with 28 arches, carrying the East Coast Main Line 126 feet (38 m) above the river Tweed. It was opened by Queen Victoria.

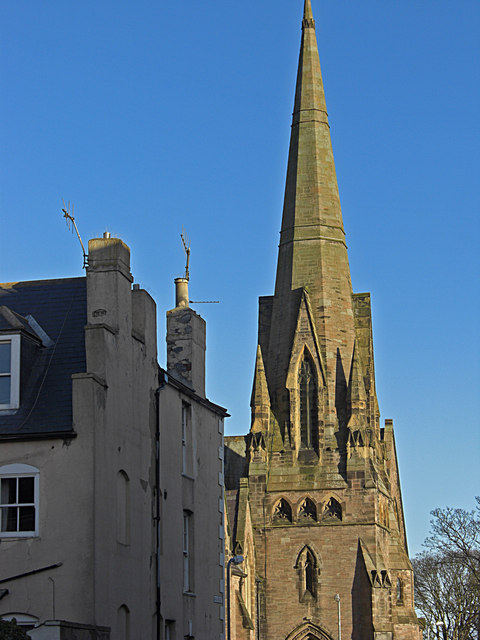
St Andrew's Church, Wallace Green

- The Corn Exchange in Sandgate, completed in 1858, and converted into apartments in the late 1990s.
- St Andrew's Church, Wallace Green was built in 1859 and is one of only eight Church of Scotland congregations in England.
- The Masonic Hall was built in 1872 for the town's St David's Masonic Lodge for £1,800. The lodge still owns the hall and is also used by other Masonic lodges and orders. It is one of few purpose-built Masonic halls in the country and is a scarce example of Victorian Masonic architecture. It has a large pipe organ built in 1895. The Hall contains many artefacts and documents concerning Freemasonry in the town, which can be traced back to 1643.
- The Royal Tweed Bridge, built in 1925 to carry the A1 road across the Tweed. Its span is 110 m (361 ft), which at the time was the longest concrete span. The A1 now bypasses the town to the west. In the early 2000s, the bridge was renovated, the road and pavement layout revised, and new street lighting added.
- Dewars Lane runs down Back Street just off Bridge Street. Like other Berwick locations, it was painted by L. S. Lowry, who visited Berwick.
- There are numerous sea caves on the coastline to the north of Berwick, with lengths up to 67 metres. The caves are found in the cliffs from Green's Haven to the Scottish border at Marshall Meadows Bay.

== Culture ==
=== Berwick's identity ===
Berwick is famous for its hesitation over whether it is part of Scotland or England. Some people are adamant they are English and their loyalty lies with Northumberland, while others feel an affinity with Scotland.

Whilst it has been argued that the town's geographic and historic place between the two has led to it developing a distinctive identity of its own, many people in Berwick also have mixed Anglo-Scottish families which contributes to a sense of separate identity. Historian Derek Sharman said "The people of Berwick feel really independent. You are a Berwicker first, Scottish or English second." Former mayor Mike Elliot said "25% of the town consider themselves English, 25% Scottish and 50% Berwickers." Professor Dominic Watt of the University of Aberdeen noted that: "Older people view themselves more as Scots than the younger people in Berwick, and this can be heard in their accents."

In 2008, the Scottish National Party MSP Christine Grahame made calls in the Scottish Parliament for Berwick to become part of Scotland again. The Liberal Democrat MSP Jeremy Purvis, who was born and brought up in Berwick, asked for the border to be moved twenty miles south, stating: "There's a strong feeling that Berwick should be in Scotland. Until recently, I had a gran in Berwick and another in Kelso, and they could see that there were better public services in Scotland." However, Alan Beith, the former MP for Berwick, said the move would require a massive legal upheaval and is not realistic. Beith's successor as MP, Anne-Marie Trevelyan, said: "Voters in Berwick-upon-Tweed do not believe it is whether they are in England or Scotland that is important."

=== Berwick dialect ===
The local speech of Berwick-upon-Tweed shares many characteristics with both other rural Northumberland dialects and East Central Scots. In 1892, linguist Richard Oliver Heslop divided the county of Northumberland into four dialect zones and placed the Berwick dialect in the "north-Northumbrian" region, an area extending from Berwick down to the River Coquet. Likewise, Charles Jones (1997) classes the dialect as "predominantly North-Northumbrian" with "a few features shared with Scots".

Features of this dialect include the "Northumbrian burr", a distinct pronunciation of the letter R historically common to many dialects of North East England; and predominant non-rhoticity: older speakers tend to be slightly rhotic, while younger speakers are universally non-rhotic.

A sociological study of the Anglo-Scottish border region conducted in 2000 found that locals of Alnwick, 30 mi (50 km) south of Berwick, associated the Berwick accent with Scottish influence. Conversely, those from Eyemouth, Scotland, 9 mi (14 km) north of Berwick, firmly classed Berwick speech as English, identifying it as "Northumbrian or Geordie".

=== Media ===
Local news and television programmes is provided by BBC North East and Cumbria and ITV Tyne Tees. Television signals are received from the Chatton TV transmitter, and with its close proximity to the Scottish Borders, BBC Scotland and ITV Border can also be received from the Selkirk TV transmitter.

The town's local radio stations are BBC Radio Newcastle on 96.0 FM and Greatest Hits Radio on 102.3 FM.

Berwick-upon-Tweed's local newspaper is the Berwick Advertiser.

=== Relations with Russia ===
There is an apocryphal story that Berwick is (or recently has been) officially at war with Russia. According to a story by George Hawthorne in The Guardian of 28 December 1966, the London correspondent of Pravda visited the Mayor of Berwick, Councillor Robert Knox, and the two made a mutual declaration of peace. Knox said, "Please tell the Russian people through your newspaper that they can sleep peacefully in their beds." The same story, cited to the Associated Press, appeared in The Baltimore Sun of 17 December 1966; The Washington Post of 18 December 1966; and The Christian Science Monitor of 22 December 1966. At some point, the real events seem to have been turned into a story of a "Soviet official" having signed a "peace treaty" with Knox; his remark to the Pravda correspondent was preserved in this version.

The basis for such status was the claim that Berwick had changed hands several times, was traditionally regarded as a special, separate entity, and some proclamations referred to "England, Scotland and the town of Berwick-upon-Tweed". One such was the declaration of the Crimean War against Russia in 1853, which Queen Victoria supposedly signed as "Victoria, Queen of Great Britain, Ireland, Berwick-upon-Tweed and all British Dominions". When the Treaty of Paris was signed to conclude the war, "Berwick-upon-Tweed" was left out. This meant that, supposedly, one of Britain's smallest towns was officially at war with one of the world's largest powers – and the conflict extended by the lack of a peace treaty for over a century. In reality, Berwick-upon-Tweed was not mentioned in either the declaration of war or the final peace treaty and was legally part of the United Kingdom for both.

== Sport ==
Berwick Rangers Football Club were formed in the town in 1881. The club plays in the Scottish football league system. The home stadium of Berwick Rangers is Shielfield Park, and the club currently plays in the Lowland League East, the fifth tier of the Scottish football league system. The town also has a rugby union side, Berwick RFC, who play in Scottish Rugby Union's East Regional League Division 1. Before 2016, the two teams were unique in being English teams that play in Scottish leagues.

A newer team in the town Tweedmouth Rangers F.C. has played in the East of Scotland Football League since 2016. Before this, they were members of the North Northumberland League. Their home ground is Old Shielfield Park, which the club uses under an agreement with Berwick Rangers.

Speedway has taken place in Berwick in two separate eras. The sport was introduced to Shielfield Park in May 1968. A dispute between the speedway club and the stadium owners ended the first spell. The sport returned to Shielfield Park in the mid-1990s. The lack of a venue in the town saw the team move to a rural location called Berrington Lough. The team, known as the Bandits, have raced at all levels from First Division to Conference League (first to third levels).

== Climate ==
Berwick-upon-Tweed has a maritime climate with narrow temperature differences between seasons. Because of its far northern position in England coupled with considerable North Sea influence, the area has very cool summers for an English location, with a subdued July (1991–2020) high of 18.1 °C (64.6 °F), more resembling a Scottish climate. January, in turn, has a high of 7.0 °C (44.6 °F) with a low of 2.1 °C (35.8 °F). Rainfall is relatively low by British standards, with 605.9 mm (23 7/8 in) on average; nonetheless, sunshine is limited to an average of 1535.4 hours per annum. All data are sourced from the Berwick-upon-Tweed station operated by the Met Office.

Climate data for Berwick-upon-Tweed, elevation: 22 m (72 ft), 1991–2020 normals
Month	Jan	Feb	Mar	Apr	May	Jun	Jul	Aug	Sep	Oct	Nov	Dec	Year
Record high °C (°F)	13.9 (57.0)	16.1 (61.0)	18.3 (64.9)	20.0 (68.0)	22.2 (72.0)	26.1 (79.0)	25.6 (78.1)	25.0 (77.0)	23.9 (75.0)	21.1 (70.0)	16.1 (61.0)	13.9 (57.0)	26.1 (79.0)
Mean daily maximum °C (°F)	7.0 (44.6)	7.6 (45.7)	9.1 (48.4)	10.9 (51.6)	13.8 (56.8)	15.8 (60.4)	18.1 (64.6)	17.7 (63.9)	16.2 (61.2)	13.1 (55.6)	9.5 (49.1)	7.2 (45.0)	12.2 (54.0)
Daily mean °C (°F)	4.6 (40.3)	4.9 (40.8)	6.2 (43.2)	7.8 (46.0)	10.3 (50.5)	12.8 (55.0)	14.8 (58.6)	14.6 (58.3)	12.9 (55.2)	10.0 (50.0)	6.9 (44.4)	4.7 (40.5)	9.2 (48.6)
Mean daily minimum °C (°F)	2.1 (35.8)	2.1 (35.8)	3.2 (37.8)	4.7 (40.5)	6.9 (44.4)	9.7 (49.5)	11.5 (52.7)	11.4 (52.5)	9.6 (49.3)	6.9 (44.4)	4.2 (39.6)	2.1 (35.8)	6.2 (43.2)
Record low °C (°F)	−11.7 (10.9)	−10.8 (12.6)	−11.7 (10.9)	−3.9 (25.0)	−0.6 (30.9)	1.7 (35.1)	4.4 (39.9)	2.8 (37.0)	1.7 (35.1)	−2.2 (28.0)	−7.2 (19.0)	−10.0 (14.0)	−11.7 (10.9)
Average precipitation mm (inches)	46.2 (1.82)	39.2 (1.54)	39.4 (1.55)	36.5 (1.44)	47.9 (1.89)	46.8 (1.84)	67.4 (2.65)	62.2 (2.45)	50.4 (1.98)	65.1 (2.56)	56.8 (2.24)	48.2 (1.90)	605.9 (23.85)
Average precipitation days (≥ 1.0 mm)	11.1	8.8	10.0	9.8	8.8	8.6	9.7	10.6	9.2	13.4	12.5	11.1	123.6
Mean monthly sunshine hours	61.5	94.1	120.0	167.9	201.5	171.3	182.4	165.8	139.3	103.5	73.9	54.2	1,535.4
Source 1: Met Office (precipitation days 1981-2010)
Source 2: Starlings Roost Weather

== Notable people ==
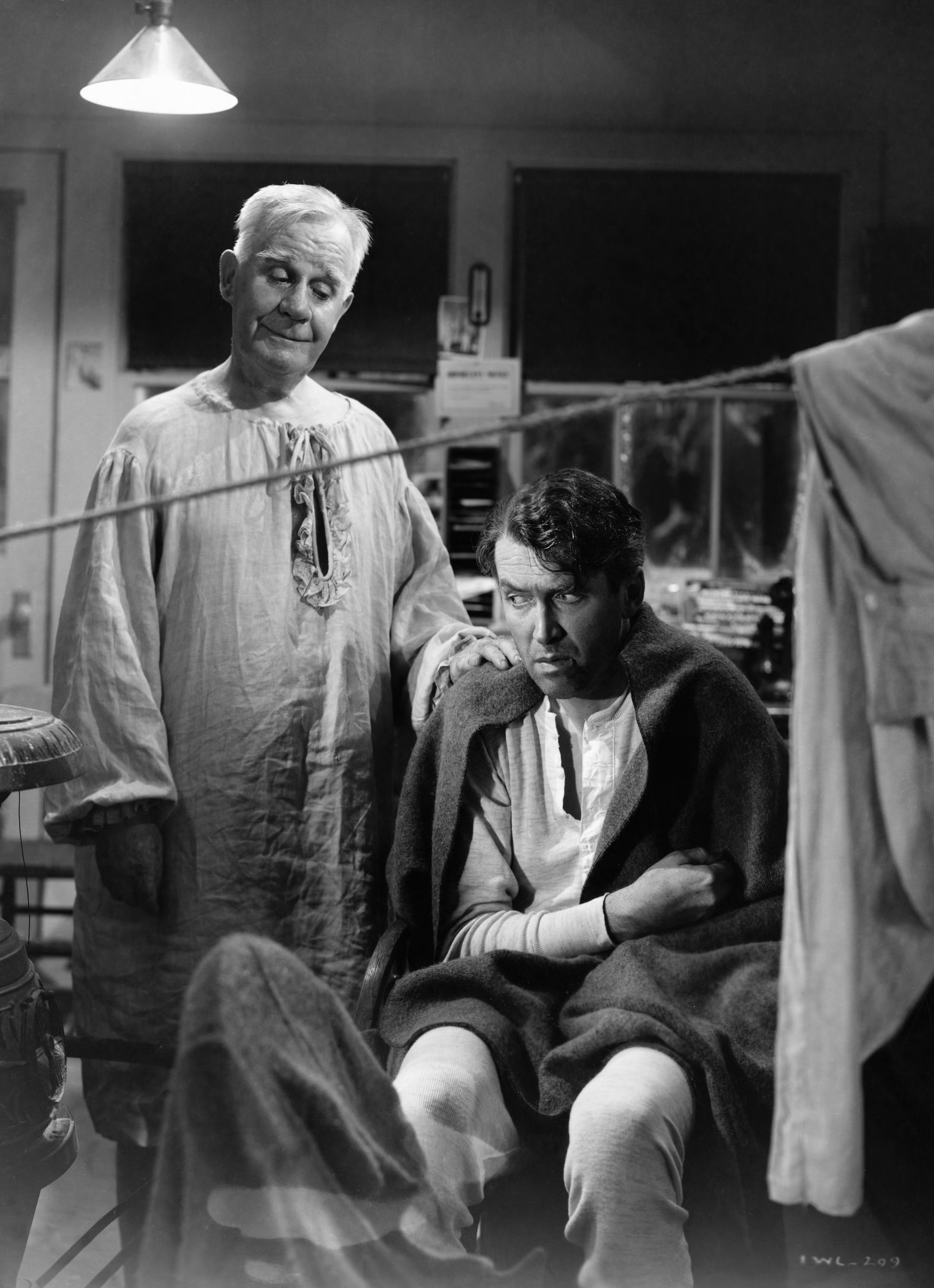
Berwick actor Henry Travers (left) appearing in It's a Wonderful Life (1946) with James Stewart

- Torben Betts, award-winning playwright, lives in Berwick
- William Bowyer (died 1628), Captain and Mayor of Berwick
- Jessie Greengrass, author, lives in Berwick-upon-Tweed
- James Cockburn, first speaker of the Canadian House of Commons, born in Berwick
- George Frederick Cooke (1756–1811), widely called the first Romantic actor in England
- Anne Hepple Dickinson (1877–1959), writer
- George Johnston (1797–1855), naturalist.
- Alexander Knox, the Hollywood actor, made Berwick his adopted home and died there.
- John Knox, the Scottish preacher, was resident protestant minister in Berwick in 1549-1550
- Rev Prof Robert Lee (1804–1868), raised in Tweedmouth
- John Leonard (born 1857), architect, born in Berwick
- Eric Lomax, the author of The Railway Man, lived in Berwick-upon-Tweed
- Alan Martin, co-creator of the comic and movie character Tank Girl, lives in Berwick
- W. H. Paxton (1844–1887), prominent Australian businessman
- Jeremy Purvis, Liberal Democrat MSP, and youngest person in Scottish Parliament at time of election. Since 2013 Purvis has been a life peer in the House of Lords, sitting on the Liberal Democrat benches.
- James Redpath American anti-slavery activist and journalist, born in Berwick
- Thomas Smith, soldier and writer
- Laura Steven, author, born in Berwick
- Joseph Stevenson, prominent English Catholic archivist and Jesuit priest, born in Berwick
- Tweedy John Todd, born in Berwick in 1789, doctor and naturalist
- Patrick Tonyn, born in Berwick in 1725, a military general and Governor of British East Florida
- Henry Travers, grew up in Berwick (although actually born in Prudhoe), was a character actor, most famously as Clarence Odbody in It's a Wonderful Life.

=== Sport ===
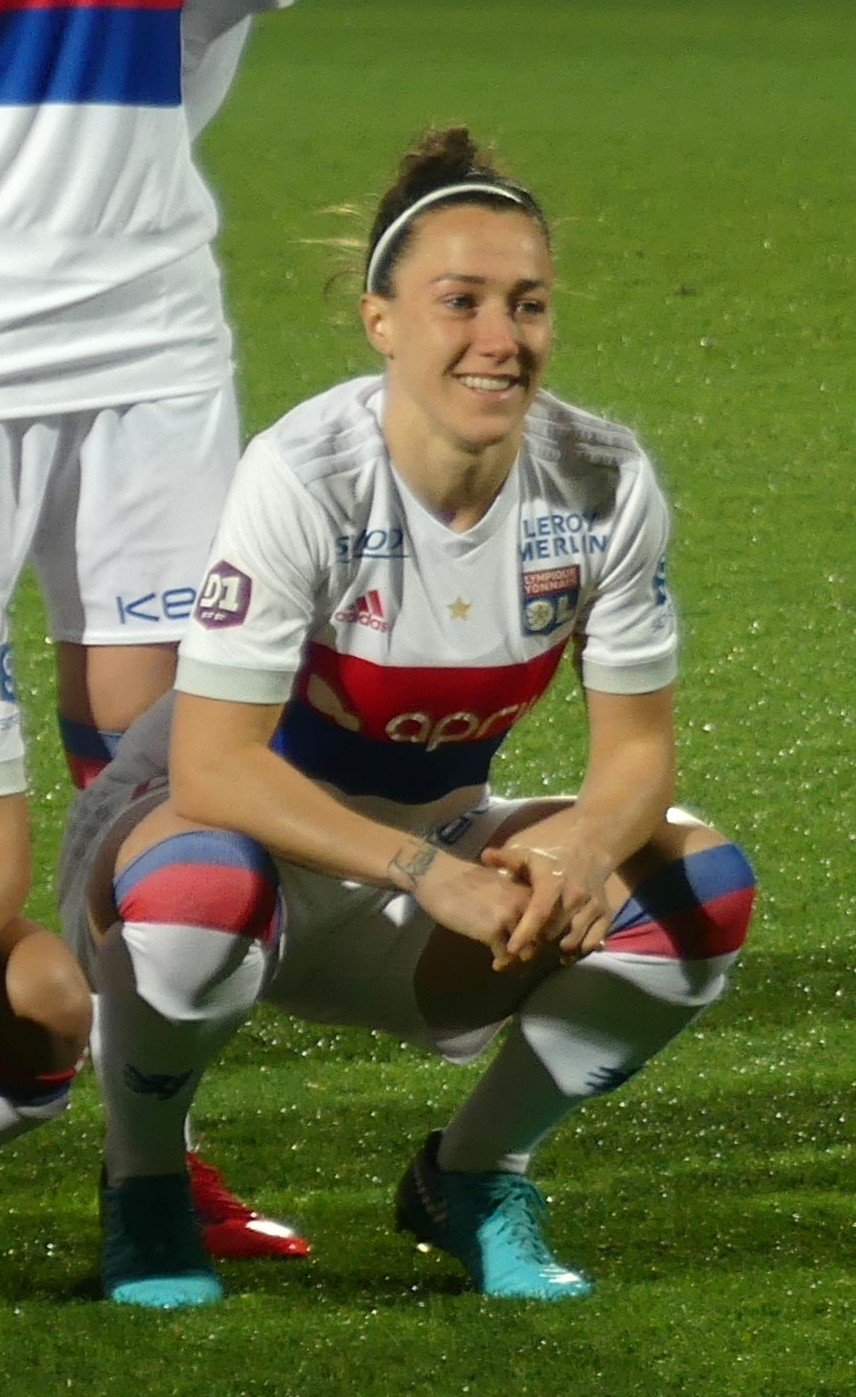
Berwick footballer Lucy Bronze, playing for Olympique Lyonnais (2018)

- Lucy Bronze, footballer for Chelsea F.C. Women and England, born in Berwick-upon-Tweed
- Thomas Herriot (1887–1949), cricketer
- Ian Sarfas, English darts player, played in the 1994 BDO World Darts Championships
- Trevor Steven, England and Everton footballer, born in Berwick.

== Twin towns ==
Berwick-upon-Tweed is twinned with:

- Berwick, Pennsylvania, United States
- Berwick, Victoria, Australia
- Haan, Nordrhein-Westfalen, Germany
- Sarpsborg, Østfold, Norway
- Trzcianka, Wielkopolskie, Poland.

== See also ==
- Berwick Film & Media Arts Festival – English film festival
- List of ships named for Berwick-upon-Tweed
- Minister of South Berwick – Christian minister in Medieval Scotland
- Scots' Dike – Cross dyke built as a Scotland-England border mark
- Scottish Marches – Border area between England and Scotland in the medieval and early modern eras
- Three Hundred and Thirty Five Years' War – 1651–1986 alleged state of war
