= Todd (surname) =

Todd is a surname meaning "fox" (from Old English todde). It is an English (mainly northern) and Scottish surname, but probably originated in Scotland for someone thought to resemble a fox in personality (in cunning or slyness) or perhaps more obviously in having red hair. This name was brought to Ulster, Ireland. It may refer to:

== People ==
- Ada Josephine Todd (1858–1904), American author and educator
- Albert E. Todd, Canadian mayor
- Albert M. Todd, US Representative from Michigan
- Alexander Todd (rugby player), English and British Isles rugby union international
- Alexander R. Todd, Baron Todd, Nobel laureate in chemistry
- Alison Todd, Australian scientist
- Alpheus Todd (1821–1884), English-born Canadian librarian and constitutional historian
- Andrew Todd (New Zealand), New Zealand businessman.
- Andy Todd (disambiguation), multiple people
- Ann Todd (1907–1993), British actress
- Armstrong Todd, MD (1826–1873), nineteenth century English surgeon
- Barbara Euphan Todd, English writer
- Beth Todd, American engineer
- Beverly Todd, American actress
- Bill Todd, NASA program manager and aquanaut
- Bob Todd, British actor
- Bob Todd (baseball), American college baseball coach
- Brendon Todd, American professional golfer
- Brent Todd, New Zealand rugby league footballer
- Bryan Todd (disambiguation), several people
- Caroline and Charles Todd, American mystery novelists
- Charles Todd (astronomer), Australian astronomer
- Charles Todd (industrialist), New Zealand businessman
- Charles Burr Todd, American historian
- Charles Lafayette Todd, American folklorist
- Charles Hawkes Todd, MD (1784–1826), Irish physician and president of the Royal College of Surgeons
- Chris Todd, English footballer
- Christine Todd Whitman, American politician
- Chuck Todd, American television host
- Colin Todd, English football player and manager
- David Todd (architect), American architect
- David Peck Todd, American astronomer
- Deborah Todd, American game designer, writer, and producer
- Dolley Payne Todd, birthname of Dolley Madison, wife of President James Madison
- Emmanuel Todd, French sociologist
- Esther Cox Todd (1895–1971) American composer, music educator and organist
- Frederick Todd, landscape architect
- Garfield Todd, South Rhodesian politician
- Geoff Todd, Australian artist
- Hallie Todd, American actress
- H. E. Todd (Herbert Eatton Todd, 1908–1988), English children's writer
- Helen M. Todd (1870–1953), American suffragist and activist
- Henry Todd (priest) (1763–1845), English clergyman
- Henry Alfred Todd (1854–1925), American scholar
- J. A. Todd (John Arthur Todd, 1908–1994), British mathematician
- Jackson Todd, former Major League Baseball pitcher
- James Todd (Canadian settler), Canadian settler in British Columbia
- James Henthorn Todd (1805–1869), Irish scholar
- Jane H. Todd (1890–1966), New York politician
- Janet Todd, British writer and biographer
- Jim Todd, American basketball coach
- John Todd (disambiguation), multiple people
- Joseph Todd, American football player
- Josh Todd (musician), American singer
- Kamari Todd, American football player
- Kathleen Todd, pioneering New Zealand child psychiatrist.
- Kathryn Doi Todd, first female Asian American judge in the United States
- Keeley Todd, New Zealand cricketer
- Kendra Todd, American reality TV winner
- Ken Todd (born 1945), British businessman
- Lance Todd, New Zealand-born British rugby league personality
- Lani Todd, American model
- Larry Todd (b. 1948), American illustrator and cartoonist
- Laurence Todd (1882–1957), American press correspondent
- Lemuel Todd, US Representative from Pennsylvania
- Louise Todd Cope (1930–2020), née Louise Moore Todd, American artist
- Malcolm Todd (archaeologist), British historian
- Malcolm Todd, American singer-songwriter, musician
- Margaret Todd (disambiguation), multiple people
- Mark Todd (disambiguation), multiple people
- Mary Todd Lincoln, First Lady of the United States
- Mia Doi Todd, American musician
- Michael Todd (disambiguation), multiple people
- Mort Todd, American humorist
- Olga Taussky Todd, Austrian-American mathematician
- Pat Canning Todd, American tennis player
- Patricia Todd, American politician from Alabama
- Paul H. Todd, Jr., US Representative from Michigan
- Paula Todd, Canadian journalist
- Peta Todd, a former English glamour girl
- Peter Todd, Canadian academic administrator
- Petra Todd, American economist
- Robert Todd (disambiguation), multiple people
- Richard Todd (1919–2009), British actor
- Richard Todd (football player), American football player
- Rick Todd, Canadian professional golfer
- Roland Todd (1900–1969), English boxer of the 1910s, and 1920s
- Ron Todd, British union leader
- Ron Todd (footballer), Collingwood FC footballer.
- Ruthven Todd, Scottish poet
- Thelma Todd, American actress
- Thomas Todd (1765–1826), American judge
- Tony Todd (1954–2024), American actor
- Tweedy John Todd (1789–1840), British biologist and physician
- W. Russell Todd (1928–2023), United States Army officer
- Walker Todd (ca. 1786–1840), New York politician
- Walter Edmond Clyde Todd (1874–1969), American ornithologist
- William Todd (disambiguation), multiple people

== Fictional characters ==
- Caitlin Todd, a character on NCIS
- Jason Todd, a character in the DC Universe
- Sweeney Todd, a character in 19th century popular literature
- Ursula Todd, a character in Life After Life

== See also ==
- Todd (disambiguation)
- Todt (disambiguation)
- Toddy (disambiguation)
- *Clan MacTavish – Todd Associated Family Name (Sept)
