= Jack Todd =

Jack Todd may refer to:

- Jack Todd (mathematician) (1911–2007), Northern Irish mathematician and pioneer in the field of numerical analysis
- Jack Todd (journalist) (born 1946), sports columnist for the Montreal Gazette
- Jack Todd (footballer, born 1881) (1881–1962), Australian rules footballer for Carlton
- Jack Todd (footballer, born 1879) (1879–1960), Australian rules footballer for St Kilda and South Melbourne
- Jack Todd (rugby league), Australian rugby league player

== See also ==
- John Todd (disambiguation)
