= Todd =

Todd or Todds may refer to:

== Places ==
=== Australia ===
- Todd River, an ephemeral river

=== United States ===
- Todd Valley, California, also known as Todd, an unincorporated community
- Todd, Missouri, a ghost town
- Todd, North Carolina, an unincorporated community
- Todd Creek (Missouri), a stream in Platte County, Missouri
- Todd Creek, Colorado, a Census-designated place in Adams County, Colorado
- Todd County, Kentucky
- Todd County, Minnesota
- Todd County, South Dakota
- Todd Fork, a river in Ohio
- Todd Township, Minnesota
- Todd Township, Fulton County, Pennsylvania
- Todd Township, Huntingdon County, Pennsylvania
- Todds, Ohio, an unincorporated community

== People ==
- Todd (given name)
- Todd (surname)

== Arts and entertainment ==
- Todd (album), a 1974 album by Todd Rundgren
- Todd (Cars), a character in Cars
- Todd (Stargate), a recurring character in the series Stargate Atlantis
- The Todd (Scrubs), a character on Scrubs
- Todd, a character in Live with Yourself!
- Todd, a character in So Help Me Todd

== Other uses ==
- Todd (elm cultivar)
- Todd class, a characteristic class in algebraic topology
- Todd-AO, a company in film post-production
- Todd Corporation, a New Zealand conglomerate

== See also ==
- TOD (disambiguation)
- Justice Todd (disambiguation)
- Toddy (disambiguation)
