= Todd (given name) =

- Gender: Male

Origin
- Origin: English
- Meaning: "Fox"

Other names
- Related names: Toddy, Tod

Todd is a masculine given name. The name originated from Middle English, where it means "fox". Notable people and characters with the name include:

== People ==
=== A–D ===
- Todd Anderson, Australian rugby player
- Todd Andrews, Irish political and military activist
- Todd Angkasuwan, Thai-American documentarian and filmmaker
- Todd Agnew, American Christian musician and songwriter
- Todd Akin, American politician and businessman
- Todd Alcott, American screenwriter, playwright, actor and director
- Todd Alsup, American pianist and singer-songwriter
- Todd Arbogast, American mathematician
- Todd Armstrong, American actor
- Todd Asalon, American baseball coach and former catcher
- Todd Astle, New Zealand cricketer
- Todd Atkinson, Canadian Anglican bishop
- Todd Atwater, American politician
- Todd Barry, American comedian
- Todd Bates (rugby league), Australian rugby player
- Todd Beamer, a passenger on board United Airlines Flight 93
- Todd Bentley, Canadian evangelist
- Todd Bertuzzi, Canadian hockey player
- Todd Blackadder, New Zealand rugby coach
- Todd Blackledge, American football player
- Todd Bodine, American race car driver
- Todd Bowles, American football coach and former player
- Todd Bridges, American actor
- Todd Brooks, Canadian Architect
- Todd Brun, American engineer and physicist
- Todd Brunson, American poker player
- Todd G. Buchholz, American economist
- Todd Burpo, American pastor
- Todd Byrne, Australian rugby player
- Todd Caldecott, Canadian actor, writer, and health practitioner
- Todd Cantwell, English footballer
- Todd Carmichael, American entrepreneur, adventure traveler, philanthropist, television personality, author, inventor, and producer
- Todd Carney, Australian rugby player
- Todd Lawrence Carter, American technology entrepreneur
- Todd Carty, English-Irish actor and director
- Todd Centeio (born 1998), American football player
- Todd Champion, American wrestler
- Todd C. Chapman, American diplomat
- Todd Charlesworth, Canadian hockey player
- D. Todd Christofferson, American religious leader
- Todd Christensen, American football player
- Todd Tamanend Clark, American poet, composer, multi-instrumentalist, cultural historian, author, artist, and activist
- Todd Clever, retired American rugby player
- Todd Coffey, American baseball player
- Todd Alexander Cohen, American actor
- Todd Congelliere, American musician and label owner
- Todd Crannell, American NFL and entertainment agent
- Todd E. Creason, American author
- Todd Cruz, American baseball player
- Todd Davis (American football), American football player
- Todd Davis, American entrepreneur and co-founder of LifeLock
- Todd Day, American basketball coach
- Todd Delmay, American politician
- Todd DePastino, American author and history professor
- Todd Dezago, American comic book writer
- Todd Donoho, American radio and television sportscaster
- Todd Doxzon, American football player
- Todd Duffee, American mixed martial artist
- Todd Dulaney, American gospel musician and former baseball player
- Todd Duncan, American baritone opera singer and actor
- Todd Dusosky, American soccer player

=== E–H ===
- Todd A. Eachus, American politician
- Todd Edwards, American record producer, DJ and singer
- Todd Edwards (film writer), American film writer/producer, film director, and writer
- Todd Eldredge, American competitive figure skater
- Todd Elik, Canadian hockey player
- Todd Ellis (American football) (1967), an American football quarterback
- Todd Ellis (motorcyclist) (1994), an English sidecar racer
- Todd Ellis Kessler, an American television producer and writer.
- Todd Elton, Australian rules footballer
- Todd Endelman, American Anglo-Jewish history professor
- Todd English, American celebrity chef, restaurateur, author, and television personality
- Todd Erdos, American baseball player
- Todd Evans, American speed metal guitarist for MOBILE DEATHCAMP
- Todd Ewen, Canadian hockey player
- Todd Fancey, Canadian guitarist, keyboardist, and solo artist
- Todd Farmer, American actor and screenwriter
- Todd Fedoruk, Canadian hockey player
- Todd Rivaldo Ferre, Indonesian footballer
- Todd Field, American actor and filmmaker
- Todd Fink, American musician, known for being the lead singer in the band The Faint
- Todd Fitch, American football coach and former player
- Todd Fisher, American director, cinematographer, producer and actor of television films and documentaries
- Todd Fox, American technical writer
- Todd Frazier, American baseball player
- Todd Frohwirth, American baseball player
- Todd Fuller, American basketball player
- Todd Gerhart, American football player
- Todd Gibson, American racing driver
- Todd Gill, Canadian hockey player
- Todd Gilliland, American race car driver
- Todd Gitlin, American sociologist, political writer, novelist, and cultural commentator
- Todd Glass, American comedian
- Todd Gloria, American politician and 37th mayor of San Diego, California
- Todd Gogulski, American cyclist
- Todd Golden, American-Israeli Basketball Coach
- Todd Graham, American football coach and former player
- Todd Grantham, American football coach
- Todd Grisham, American sports reporter
- Todd Gurley, American football player
- Todd Haberkorn, American voice actor
- Todd Haley, American football coach
- Todd Hallowell, American film producer
- Todd Hamilton, American golfer
- Todd Hanson, American writer and voice actor
- Todd Hardy, Canadian carpenter, trade union activist and politician
- Todd Harkins, American hockey player
- Todd Harrison, American businessman and entrepreneur, founder and CEO of Minyanville
- Todd Haynes, American filmmaker
- Todd Hays, American bobsledder
- Todd Hazelwood, Australian race car driver
- Todd Heap, American football player
- Todd Heatherton, American professor of neurology and psychology
- Todd Heisler, American photojournalist
- Todd Helton, American baseball player
- Todd Hendricks, American football player
- Todd Hennig, American drummer
- Todd Herman, American radio show host, digital political strategist and public speaker
- Todd Herremans, American football player
- Todd Herzog, American reality TV personality, known for being the winner of Survivor: China
- Todd van der Heyden, Canadian journalist and news anchor
- Todd Hicks, American soccer player
- Todd Hido, American artist and photographer
- Todd Hiett, American rancher and politician
- Todd Hignite, American author and comic critic
- Todd Hlushko, Canadian hockey player
- Todd Hodgetts, Australian para-athlete
- Todd Joseph Miles Holden, American-born Japanese social scientist, essayist, philosopher, and novelist
- Todd Holland, American television and film director and producer
- Todd Hollandsworth, American baseball player
- Todd Hollenbach, American politician
- Todd Holoubek, American film and television actor, comedian and sketch-comedy writer
- Todd Howard (disambiguation), several people
- Todd Huffman, American technology entrepreneur and photographer
- Todd Hughes, American screenwriter, producer and film director
- Todd Ames Hunter, American politician
- Todd Hunter, New Zealand musician and composer, known for his work with the band Dragon
- Todd Husak, American football player
- Todd Huston, American politician
- Todd Huth, American guitarist

=== I–L ===
- Todd Incantalupo, Italian baseball player
- Todd Interdonato, American college baseball coach and former player
- Todd Jadlow, American basketball player
- Todd Jarrett, American competitive shooter, firearms instructor, and filmmaker
- Todd Jensen, American bassist
- Todd Johnson, American football player
- Todd Jones, American baseball player
- Todd Jordan, American football player
- Todd Kaminsky, American attorney and politician
- Todd Kane, English footballer
- Todd Karns, American actor
- Todd Kelly, Australian race car driver
- Todd Kerns, Canadian musician
- Todd Kessler, American television producer
- Todd Ellis Kessler, American television producer and writer
- Todd Kidd, Australian light-welterweight boxer
- Todd Kim, American attorney
- Todd Kimsey, American film, stage and television actor
- Todd Kincannon, American attorney, political activist and dog murderer
- Todd Klein, American comic book letterer, logo designer and writer
- Todd Klick, American author, screenwriter, director and producer
- Todd Kohlhepp, American serial killer
- Todd Komarnicki, American playwright and novelist
- Todd Krasnow, American entrepreneur and businessman
- Todd Krygier, American hockey player
- Todd Lamb (politician), American politician
- Todd Lamb (racing driver), American race car driver
- Todd Lasance, Australian actor
- Todd J. Leach, American academic administrator
- Todd Lehmann, American basketball player
- Todd Lichti, American basketball player
- Todd Lickliter, American basketball coach
- Todd Lieberman, American film and television producer
- Todd Lockwood, American artist
- Todd Loewen, Canadian politician
- Todd London, American film and television producer
- Todd Louiso, American film actor and film director
- Todd Lowe, American actor
- Todd Lowrie, Australian Rugby League player
- Todd Lyght, American football player
- Todd Lynn, American comedian

=== M–R ===
- Todd Marinovich, American and Canadian football player
- Todd Martin, American tennis player
- Todd McCaffrey, Irish-American author
- Todd McCarthy, American film critic
- Todd McClay, New Zealand politician and former ambassador
- Todd McFarlane, Canadian comic book creator, artist, writer, filmmaker and entrepreneur
- Todd McKenney, Australian entertainer
- Todd McLellan, Canadian hockey coach
- Todd McNair, American football coach and former player
- Todd McShay, American football analyst and commentator
- T.J. Miller, American actor, stand-up comedian, producer, and writer.
- Todd Monken, American football coach
- Todd Muller, New Zealand politician
- Todd Murphy, Australian cricket player
- Todd Nance, American musician
- Todd Nauck, American comic book artist and writer
- Todd Nelson (ice hockey), Canadian hockey coach and former player
- Todd Nelson (tennis), American former tennis player
- Todd Newton, American television personality best known for hosting game shows including Whammy! and Family Game Night
- Todd Nicholson, Canadian sledge hockey player
- Todd Novak, American newspaper editor and politician
- Todd Nunes, American screenwriter and director
- Todd Okerlund, American former hockey player
- Todd Oldham, American fashion designer
- Todd Oliynyk, Australian mathematics professor
- Todd Ollivier, Australian former rugby player
- Todd O'Brien, American-born Armenian basketball player
- Todd O'Keefe, American singer-songwriter, guitarist, and bassist
- Todd Orlando, American football coach and former player
- Todd Otis, American businessman and politician
- Todd Ousley, American prelate of the Episcopal Church
- Todd Palin, American oil field production operator, commercial fisherman and First Gentleman of Alaska (2006–2009)
- Todd Park, Korean-American entrepreneur and government executive
- Todd Parr, American author and illustrator of children's books
- Todd Payten, Australian former rugby player
- Todd Peck, American race car driver
- Todd Pettengill, American radio disc jockey
- Todd Phillips, American film director, producer, screenwriter, and actor
- Todd James Pierce, American novelist and short story writer
- Todd Russell Platts, American attorney and politician
- Todd Pletcher, American thoroughbred horse trainer
- Todd Pratt, American baseball player
- Todd S. Purdum, American journalist and magazine editor
- Todd J. Rathner, American Second Amendment lobbyist and National Rifle Association director
- Todd Ray, American former record producer and mixing engineer
- Todd Alan Reed, American serial killer
- Todd Ricketts, American politician and businessman
- Todd Riech, American javelin thrower
- Todd Ritter, American author
- Todd D. Robinson, American diplomat and ambassador
- Todd Rogers (gamer), American gamer and con man
- Todd Rogers, American beach volleyball player
- Todd Rokita, American politician
- Todd Rose, American scientist, author, professor and social entrepreneur
- Todd Rucci, American football player
- Todd Rundgren, American rock singer
- Todd Russell, Canadian politician
- Todd Rutherford, American politician

=== S–Z ===
- Todd Saldana, American soccer player
- Todd Salimuchai, self-described Thai or Burmese aircraft hijacker and opium farmer
- Todd Sampson, Canadian-born Australian documentary-maker and television presenter
- Todd Sand, American pair skater
- Todd Sanders, American artist
- Todd Santos, American former football player
- Todd Sauerbrun, American former football player
- Todd Schlekeway, American politician
- Todd Schlopy, American motion picture cameraman and former football player
- Todd Schmitz, American swimming coach
- Todd Schnitt, American conservative talk radio host
- Todd Schorr, American artist
- Todd Schuler, American politician
- Todd Schultz, US Virgin Island bobsledder
- Todd Sickafoose, American jazz and rock musician, composer and producer/engineer
- Todd Sieben, American politician
- Todd Siler, American multimedia artist, author, educator and inventor
- Todd Sinnott, Australian golfer
- Todd Smith, American professional wrestler
- Todd Snider, American singer-songwriter
- Todd Snyder (racing driver), American racecar driver
- Todd Snyder (American football), American football player
- Todd Snyder (fashion designer), American fashion designer
- Todd Solondz, American filmmaker and playwright
- Todd Souza, American race car driver
- Todd Spitzer, American district attorney
- Todd Staples, American agriculture commissioner and politician
- Todd Starnes, American conservative columnist, commentator, author and radio host
- Todd Stashwick, American actor and writer
- Todd Stephens, American film director
- Todd Stephens (politician), American politician
- Todd Stephenson, New Zealand lawyer and politician
- Todd Stern, American politician and climate activist
- Todd Steverson, American baseball coach
- Todd D. Still, American New Testament scholar
- Todd Stoll, American jazz trumpeter
- Todd Stone, Canadian politician
- Todd Stottlemyre, American former baseball player
- Todd Strange, American musician, known for being the bassist for the band Crowbar
- Todd Strasser, American writer
- Todd Strauss-Schulson, American film director, screenwriter, producer, editor and cinematographer
- Todd Stroger, American politician
- Todd Sucherman, drummer for Styx
- Todd Susman, American actor
- Todd Talbot, Canadian actor and television personality
- Todd Terje, Norwegian DJ, songwriter, and record producer
- Todd Terry, American DJ, record producer and remixer
- Todd Thibaud, American singer-songwriter
- Todd Thicke, Canadian television writer and producer
- Todd Thomas (American football), American footballer
- Todd Thomas (designer), American creative director and fashion designer
- Todd Thomsen, American politician
- Todd Tiahrt, American politician
- Todd Tibbals, American architect
- Todd Tichenor, American baseball umpire
- Todd Tilghman, American pastor and singer. Winner of the 18th season of The Voice
- Todd Tobias, American multi-instrumentalist and music producer
- Todd La Torre, American musician. Lead singer of the band Queensrÿche
- Todd Torres, Puerto Rican freestyle swimmer
- Todd Anthony Tyler, Canadian reality television judge, fashion photographer and former model
- Todd Van Poppel, American baseball player
- Todd Van Steensel, Australian baseball player
- Todd Verow, American film director
- Todd Viney, Australian former Australian rules footballer
- Todd Vogt (born 1974), American Paralympic rower
- Todd Wagner, American entrepreneur and co-founder of Broadcast.com
- Todd Walker, American baseball player
- Todd Webb, American photographer
- Todd Weiler, American politician
- Todd Wellemeyer, American former baseball player
- Todd Whitaker, American educator, writer, motivational speaker, educational consultant, and professor
- Todd White, American artist
- Todd Wilbur, American cook-book author
- Todd Williams, American actor
- Todd Williamson, American artist
- Todd Wiltshire, Australian motorcycle speedway racer
- Todd Wiseman Jr., American filmmaker and entrepreneur
- Todd Withers, American basketball player
- Todd Witsken, American tennis player
- Todd Witteles, American poker player
- Todd Wolfe, American guitarist and singer-songwriter
- Todd Womack, American comedian
- Todd Woodbridge, Australian tennis player
- Todd Woodcroft, Canadian hockey coach
- Todd Worrell, American baseball player
- Todd Yeagley, American soccer coach
- Todd Yoder, American football player
- Todd Young, American politician
- Todd Youth, American guitarist
- Todd Zeile, American baseball player
- Todd Zuniga, American author and magazine editor
- Todd Zywicki, American law professor

== Fictional characters ==
- Todd Alquist, on the TV series Breaking Bad
- Todd Chavez, on BoJack Horseman voiced by Aaron Paul
- Todd Dempsy, one of the main characters from the American television sitcom Outsourced
- Todd Flanders, on The Simpsons
- Todd Grimshaw, played by Bruno Langley on UK soap opera Coronation Street
- Todd Ianuzzi, on Beavis and Butt-head
- Todd Ingram, from the Scott Pilgrim graphic novel series
- Todd Landers, played by Kristian Schmid on Australian soap opera Neighbours
- Todd Manning, from the daytime soap One Life to Live
- Todd Packer, a traveling sales representative portrayed by David Koechner on the American version of The Office
