= John Todd =

John Todd or Tod may refer to:

== Clergy ==
- John Todd (abolitionist) (1818–1894), preacher and 'conductor' on the Underground Railroad
- John Todd (author) (1800–1873), American minister and author
- John Todd (bishop), Anglican bishop in the early 17th century
- John Baptist Todd (1921–2017), Pakistani Franciscan priest

== Mathematics, science, and medicine ==
- John Todd (British biologist) (born 1958), British biologist working on diabetes mellitus
- John Todd (Canadian biologist) (born 1939), Canadian biologist working in the field of ecological design
- John (Jack) Todd (1911–2007), Northern Irish and American mathematician working in the field of numerical analysis
- J. A. Todd (John Arthur Todd, 1908–1994), English mathematician
- John Lancelot Todd (1876–1949), Canadian physician and parasitologist
- John W. Todd (1912–1989), British physician and author

== Politics and government ==
- John Tod (1779–1830), American judge and politician
- John Todd (politician) (fl. 1991–1999), Canadian politician from the Northwest Territories
- John Todd (Virginia soldier) (1750–1782), early Virginia official, Kentucky soldier, and great-uncle of Mary Todd Lincoln
- John Blair Smith Todd (1814–1872), delegate to US Congress from Dakota Territory
- John J. Todd (1927–2024), Justice of the Minnesota Supreme Court
- John Rawling Todd (1929–2002), British colonial civil servant

== Sports ==
- John Kennedy Tod (1852–1925), Scottish rugby union player
- John Todd (footballer) (1938–2024), Australian rules football player and coach
- John Todd (rugby league), rugby league footballer of the 1910s and 1920s

== Other ==
- John Todd (actor) (1876–1957), American actor who played Tonto on the Lone Ranger radio series
- John Todd (businessman) (1927–2015), New Zealand businessman
- John Todd (conspiracy theorist) (1949–2007), source for fundamentalist Baptist author Jack Chick
- John Todd (RAF officer) (1899–1980), British World War I flying ace
- John Payne Todd (1792–1852), step-son of U.S. President James Madison

== See also ==
- John Tod (1779–1830), member of the U.S. House of Representatives from Pennsylvania
- Jack Todd (disambiguation)
