= Todd Township =

Todd Township may refer to several places:

In Canada

- Todd Township, Kenora District, Ontario (geographic / historical)

In the United States

- Todd Township, Hubbard County, Minnesota
- Todd Township, Craig County, Oklahoma (historical)
- Todd Township, Fulton County, Pennsylvania
- Todd Township, Huntingdon County, Pennsylvania

See also

- Todd (disambiguation)
