= Charles Todd =

Chuck, Charlie or Charles Todd may refer to:

== Businessmen ==
- Charles Todd (industrialist) (1868–1942), New Zealand businessman
- Charles Leonard Todd (1871–1932), American businessman, farmer, and politician

== Physicians ==
- Charles Hawkes Todd (1784–1826), Irish president of Royal College of Surgeons
- Charles Edward Todd (1858–1917), Australian doctor in Adelaide, son of engineer Charles Todd

== Writers ==
- Charles Stewart Todd (1791–1871), American army officer, ambassador and newspaper editor
- Charles Todd (engineer) (1826–1910), Australian astronomer, builder of telegraph lines and science writer
- Charles Burr Todd (1849–1928), American historian of Revolutionary War era
- Charles Lafayette Todd (1911–2004), American folklorist
- Charles Todd, pseudonym used by Caroline and Charles Todd, American mother and son mystery novelists
- Chuck Todd (born 1972), American political journalist and TV interviewer

== Others ==
- Charlie Todd, American comedy performer, founder of Improv Everywhere in 2001

== See also ==
- Charles Crosthwaite (Charles Haukes Todd Crosthwaite , 1835–1915), British Crown Commissioner and chronicler of Burma
