= John Callan (disambiguation) =

John Callan (1882–1951) was a New Zealand judge.

John Callan may also refer to:

- John Callan (New Zealand politician) (1844–1928), New Zealand politician and attorney, father of John Callan
- John Fullarton Callan (fl. 1920s), Canadian politician from Ontario
- John S. Callan (1890–1950), American politician from Nebraska

== See also ==
- John Callan O'Laughlin (1873–1949), American journalist and public official
