= Todd Ellis =

Todd Ellis may refer to:

- Todd Ellis (American football) (1967), an American football quarterback
- Todd Ellis (motorcyclist) (1994), an English sidecar racer
- Todd Ellis Kessler, an American television producer and writer.

== See also ==
- Todd (given name)
- Ellis (surname)
