= Sharon Middendorf =

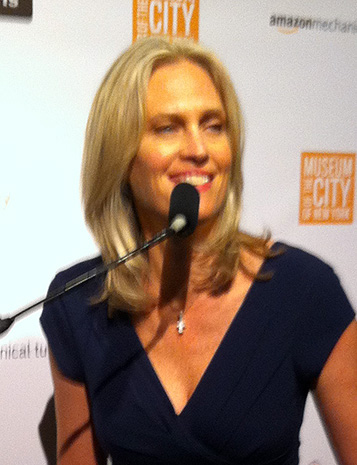
- Middendorf speaking at The Museum of the City of New York

Background information
- Born: Sharon Lyn Middendorf; January 5, 1962; San Diego, California
- Origin: New York City
- Genres: Pop; Rock; Alternative rock
- Occupations: Model, Musician, Entrepreneur, Singer-songwriter, Record Producer, Actress
- Instruments: Vocals, Guitar, Bass, Harmonica, Drums, Tambourine
- Years active: 1980–present
- Labels: Rawkus; Mercury Records; Ten Wings Music
- Website: sharon-middendorf.com

Sharon Lyn Middendorf (born January 5, 1962) is an American entrepreneur, model, and musician. She is best known as the lead singer in the rock band Motorbaby and for her roles in the films 13 Going on 30 and Terror Firmer. She has also appeared in music videos for the Beastie Boys, Cheap Trick and AC/DC.

== Early life ==
Middendorf was born in San Diego, California. Her family moved to Cleveland, Ohio where she grew up and attended Strongsville High School. Middendorf began singing at age five and got her first guitar at age seven. She formed acoustic bands to perform in church when she was 14. Around that time, she joined the John Robert Powers School of Modeling and began modeling for Halle's, The May Company, and The Cleveland Plain Dealer.

== Career ==
=== Modeling ===
At the age of 17, while modeling in Cleveland, Middendorf was signed by John Casablancas to his agency, Elite Model Management in New York and Paris, as well as the now defunct Paris Planning, and Wilhelmina Models in Los Angeles. Middendorf appeared in advertisements for a number of well-known brands. She appeared on many magazine and catalogue covers including Time, Money, Kiplinger's, Femme Pratique, Bloomingdale's, Mary McFadden, Look, Sports, and Moda Magazine. Middendorf walked the Paris, London, Milan and New York catwalks for designers Thierry Mugler, Claude Montana, Chantal Thomass and Marc Jacobs. Middendorf is represented by the Bella Agency in New York and LA.

=== Acting ===
In 1984, while pursuing here career as a fashion model, Middendorf met MTV co-founder Les Garland and appeared as a dancer on the first MTV Video Music Awards show with ZZ Top. Her performance at the VMAs caught the attention of producer Rick Rubin, who cast Middendorf in the first Beastie Boys video, "She's On It." Middendorf also appeared in Cheap Trick’s "Tonight it's You," and AC/DC's "Stiff Upper Lip." In 1991, she made her first appearance in the feature film Terror Firmer and appeared in the films 13 Going on 30; Sweet and Lowdown; Bright Lights, Big City; and Sex and The City.

=== Music ===
In 1987, Middendorf appeared as the lead singer for the Lower East Side psychedelic rock band, The Blacklight Chameleons, on their Inner Mission album. In 1992, Middendorf founded independent music label Ten Wings Music and released an album for the NYC rock band Ten Wings entitled Wishing Well. Middendorf formed Motorbaby in 1994 and signed to Rawkus in 1996. She signed with manager Kenny Laguna in 1998 and the band released their self-titled debut album Motorbaby on Mercury Records. In 2001 Middendorf released Motorbaby's second album (Middendorf's fourth studio album) Rise on Ten Wings Music. Rise features musicians Tony Visconti and the Go-Go's Kathy Valentine along with several others.

Middendorf has appeared on the covers of High Times and Cover Magazine. Over the course of her music career, Middendorf has released four studio albums, two compilations, a greatest hits album, four singles, and has contributed to a number of film soundtracks. In addition to her own work, Middendorf has written and performed with Tony Visconti, Reeves Gabrels, Ronnie Mancuso, Les Warner, and Kathy Valentine. She also played guitar and sang back-up vocals for Sandra Bernhard on her album I'm Still Here... Damn It!.

=== Business ventures ===
Middendorf founded GO-Cottage, a bungalow vacation rental in Lake Placid, NY and is a co-founder of Tagasauris, a video search and discovery platform.

== Personal life ==
Middendorf is a human and animal rights activist, is married and has a dog.

== Discography ==
Studio albums

- Wishing Well (1996)
- Motorbaby (1998)
- Rise (2001)
- The Greatest (2010)

Singles

- "Lose Your Mind" (2007)
- "Silent Night" (2008)
