= UK Oil and Gas =

UK business

UK Oil and Gas PLC (formerly UK Oil and Gas Investments PLC and Sarantel Group PLC)
- Company type: Public limited company
- Traded as: AIM: UKOG
- Founded: 2000 (Wellingborough)
- Headquarters: Wellingborough, United Kingdom
- Key people: Stephen Sanderson (Executive Chairman and CEO) Matt Cartwright (Chief Operating Officer) Kiran Morzaria (Finance Director) Allen D Howard (Non-Executive Director)
- Industry: Oil and Gas Exploration and Production
- Revenue: £0.21 million (2017)
- Website: Official website

UK Oil and Gas PLC (AIM: UKOG) was the name of a UK-based oil and gas exploration and production company. The company is listed on the London Stock Exchange in the Alternative Investment Market).

On 10 September 2026, UKOG announced it had changed its name to UK Energy Group PLC and ticker symbol to AIM: UKEN, changing business direction to geological energy (hydrogen) storage and related clean power.

== Company history ==
=== 2013 to present ===
The company assumed its present name on 4 December 2013. The following day it changed its TIDM (ticker symbol) to UKOG.

In March 2016, UKOG made national news with the flow-testing of the Horse Hill 1 well (HH-1) three miles north of Gatwick Airport, achieving the highest flow rates of an onshore well in the UK. From three zones a combined flow rate of 1,688 barrels a day was achieved.

In 2017, the Broadford Bridge well (BB-1) and its associated sidetrack BB-1z were drilled. However, this project was less successful than HH-1, with complications involving blocked fractures in the well bore, which led to flow rates considered sub-commercial to date.

UKOG is currently performing an Extended Well Test at Horse Hill to identify whether the HH-1 well can be considered commercial, both from the Portland sandstone and the Kimmeridge limestone. The Portland has now been declared commercially viable and planning permission has been given for five additional wells at the Horse Hill site, with a goal of about 3,200 barrels of oil a day, which, if achieved, would make it the second-largest land-based oil production site in the UK.

In 2026, UKOG exited the UK onshore oil and gas business.

On 10 September 2026, UKOG announced it had changed its name to UK Energy Group PLC ("UKEn") and ticker symbol to UKEN and was changing its strategic direction to geological energy (hydrogen) storage and related clean power.

== Former operations in the United Kingdom ==
UKOG had interests in seven oil and gas assets in the South of England through a mixture of exploration licences and a few ageing production fields.

=== Weald Basin ===
The majority of UKOG's current development and appraisal programme is in the Weald Basin, where its flagship assets at Horse Hill (Horley) (Licence: PEDL137/PEDL246) and Broadford Bridge (Licence: PEDL234) are located. UKOG also has a 40 per cent interest in the Holmwood prospect, which is operated by Europa (oil company). Other exploration interests include Arreton (Isle of Wight) (PEDL331) and Markwells Wood (PEDL126). UKOG has two field in production that are operated by IGas Energy: Horndean (10 per cent interest) and Avington (5 per cent interest).

UKOG sold the Horse Hill oilfield site in 2026 at a large loss, after over a decade of trying to obtain planning permission to develop it. In 2024 the UK Supreme Court determined that the planning authority needed to assess indirect downstream greenhouse gas emissions in the environmental impact assessment.

Subsequently UKOG' CEO, Stephen Sanderson, said the sale was a "timely and attractive opportunity to complete UKOG's exit from the UK onshore oil and gas sector".
