= Andrew Tod =

Andrew Tod may refer to:

- Andrew Tod (footballer, born 1971), Scottish football defender
- Andrew Tod (footballer, born 2006), Scottish football midfielder for Dunfermline Athletic

== See also ==
- Andrew Todd (disambiguation)
