= Todd Lawrence Carter =

American technology entrepreneur

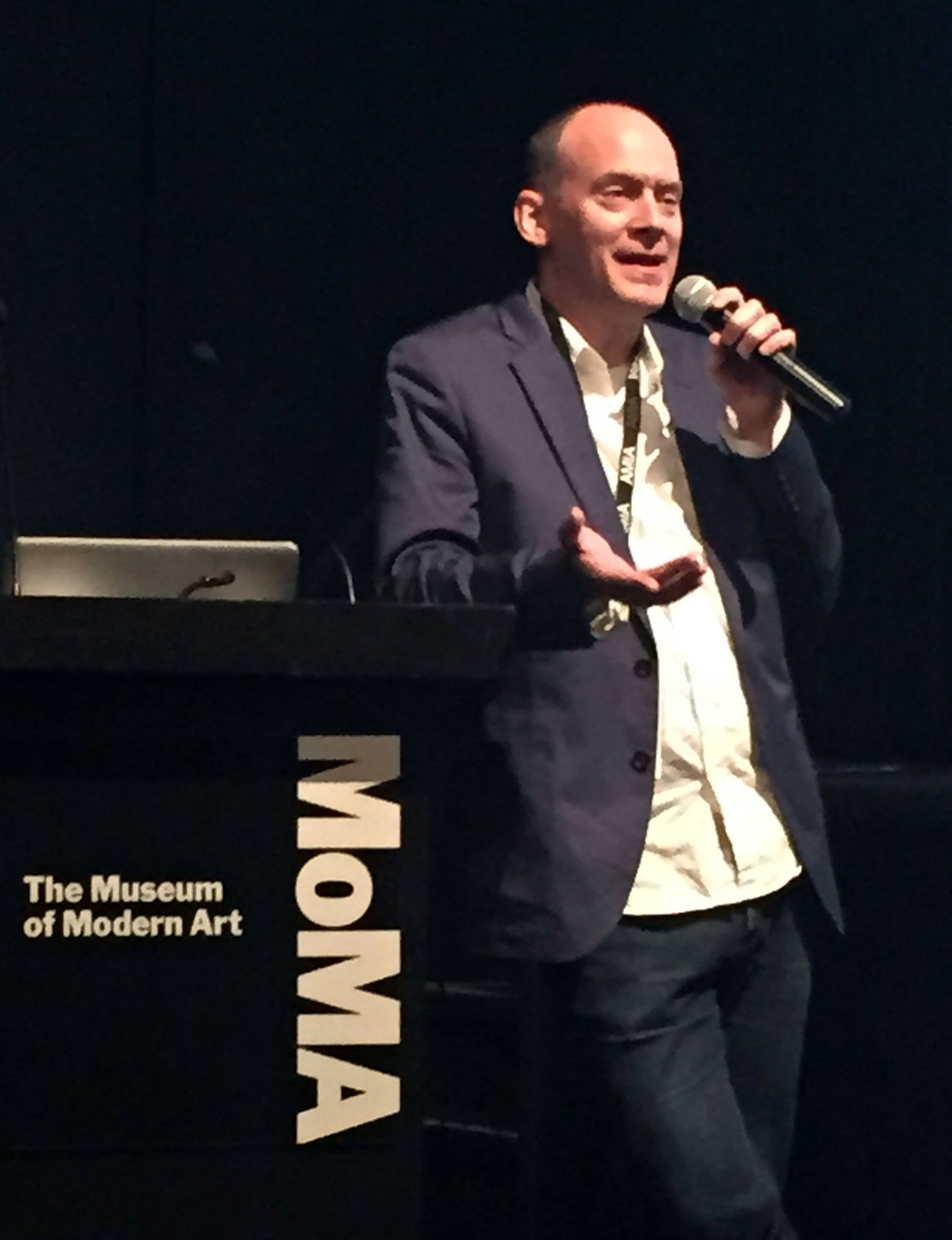
- Carter speaking at the 2017 Digital Asset Symposium at MOMA in New York City on May 5, 2017
- Born: Trenton, New Jersey
- Occupation: Technology entrepreneur
- Known for: Tagasauris

Todd Lawrence Carter is an American technology entrepreneur. He is best known as the CEO of the New York City-based technology startup company Tagasauris that he co-founded in December 2010.

== Background and education ==
Carter was born in Trenton, New Jersey, and grew up in a household of inventors. His family moved to Perkasie, Pennsylvania, and later to Orchard Lake, Michigan, where he finished West Bloomfield High School. Carter attended the Universities of Michigan and Massachusetts where he majored in international relations and the University of Dijon (France).

== Career ==
=== AXS ===
Carter began work on his vision of hypermedia around 1990 as a product manager for Berkeley, California–based AXS. AXS developed some of the earliest software for image databases for Apple's Macintosh computer and Carter was instrumental in the commercialization of these products, NewPhotoAccess, PhotoProcessor and OnlineReader within the media and publishing industry. In 1992, AXS introduced its File Concatenation Protocol ("AFCP) for embedded metadata which was subsequently adopted by Reuters, Agence France Presse and Hasselblad Electronic Imagining for application on the receiving end of their digital photo wire services and products.

=== PressLink ===
Carter served as the technology development Director of PressLink, Inc., a Washington, D.C. area based Knight-Ridder digital content distribution company. PressLink aggregated digital information graphics and images from a network of more than 40 information providers and made them available online on an à la carte basis to newsrooms in more than 300 cities in 70 countries worldwide.

In order to virtually integrate PressLink's vast online databases with networked Macintosh computers that were common in the newsrooms of the day and enhance the ability to create a better newspaper in a shorter amount of time, Carter formed a collaboration with an ex-Apple Advanced Technology Group (ATG) software engineer, Dwayne Bowman to develop PressLink Explorer. In October 1994, Carter and Bowman launched PressLink Explorer, a mixed media search and retrieval system that allowed users to rapidly browse, search and access downloaded material while working within other applications, such as Adobe Photoshop or QuarkXPress.

PressLink Explorer consumed and persisted metadata using the AXS AFCP standard with a custom Claris XNTD to convert AFCP to plaintext for indexing via an AppleSearch server. Carter and Bowman envisioned archives of newspapers as information sources in a distributed, revenue-generating on-line system, electronically accessible other papers, other businesses and the public. This vision was in-part informed by an ATG client application known as Rosebud, which in combination with an AppleSearch server, delivered a personalized newspaper where stories were collected into a multi-column display that looked like a real newspaper, along with a personalized banner across the top.

=== BusyBox ===
Inspired by the potential of networked multimedia and the release of NCSA Mosaic, first browser to display images inline with text instead of displaying images in a separate window, Carter formed his first technology startup company, San Francisco, California–based, BusyBox which he co-founded in 1995 and served as Chief Technology Officer and Vice President up through the company's initial public offering in 2000.

While at BusyBox Carter pioneered the development of digital media technologies for still image and video distributed over the Internet. At that time, the digital media market included photographs, video and music content. From 1995 to mid 1999, Carter and BusyBox developed the technologies and e-commerce functionality needed to catalog, display, preview, sell and download digital photographs for some of the largest and most active online digital photography libraries. Beginning in 1998, intense consolidation within the stock photography market resulted in a rapidly shrinking pool of potential new customers for BusyBox's stock photography products and services.

In late 1998, Carter realized that emerging broadband infrastructure would allow digitized media of all types to become available to not only the professional market but also to the emerging, desktop consumer market. During 1999, Carter lead BusyBox to use its knowledge and experience in building and managing high-volume, transaction photo library Web sites to develop an end-to-end (preview to download to purchase) Internet solution for video. Only this time, BusyBox would own the video content thereby expanding its revenue channels from licensing technology and managing sites to wholly owned, royalty-free (unrestricted) content sales, thereby providing an opportunity for greater profit margins.

Carter represented BusyBox as a delegate to ISO/IEC 15938 responsible for the MPEG-7 multimedia content description interface standard.

=== Owl Music Search ===
Carter served as vice president of Internet products and strategy of plain sight systems, during which time he co-founded Owl Multimedia Inc. In late 2007 Owl Multimedia and Creative Commons launched Owl Music Search.

=== Tagasauris ===
More than a decade of experience with multimedia on the Web produced insights that led Carter to the creation of Tagasauris, Inc. Tagasauris provided media annotation services using a combination of crowdsourcing, gamification, machine intelligence, and semantics to create and discover key tags for characteristics of the media object that is being annotated.

On April 25, 2012, Carter addressed the UC Berkeley School of Information Dean's Lecture Series, Empowering Libraries, Archives, and Museums with Crowd-sourced Human Computation and Linked Open Data.
