= Trinity Catholic College, Dunedin =

Catholic school in Dunedin, New Zealand

Trinity Catholic College

Location
- 340 Rattray Street; Dunedin; New Zealand; 45.87413°S 170.496453°E

Information
- Type: State-integrated secondary
- Motto: Latin: Ipsa Duce (With Her As Our Guide)
- Established: 1989; 37 years ago (antecedent secondary schools: 1871, 1876, 1878, 1897 and 1976)
- Ministry of Education Institution no.: 536
- Principal: Kate Nicholson
- Deputy Principal: Steve Read
- Assistant Principals: Trish James
- Grades: 7–13
- Gender: Coeducational
- Enrolment: 867 (July 2026)
- Socio-economic decile: 8P
- Website: trinity.school.nz

Trinity Catholic College (known as Kavanagh College before 2023) is a Catholic, state-integrated, co-educational, secondary school located at Rattray St, in City Rise, central Dunedin, New Zealand. The proprietor of the school is the Catholic Bishop of Dunedin. The school was founded in 1989 as the ultimate successor of several secondary schools and one primary school. The immediate predecessor schools were Moreau College (for girls) and St Edmund's boys primary school both located in South Dunedin and St Paul's High School (for boys) on whose Rattray St site Trinity Catholic College was established. Trinity is the only Catholic secondary school in Dunedin and is open to enrolments from throughout the entire city.

The name Trinity Catholic College affirms the Christian belief in the Holy Trinity "which is God revealed as Father, Son and Holy Spirit, a community of love" and affirms "the Christian values and faith in God that are at the heart of the school's mission."

== History ==
=== Foundation ===
In 1989, Trinity Catholic College, then named Kavanagh College, opened. It resulted from the amalgamation of Moreau College for girls and St Paul's High School (i.e. the Christian Brothers School) for boys. The senior classes of St Edmund's School (i.e. years 7 and 8) transferred to the new college. The junior classes (Years 5 and 6) were accommodated in Dunedin Catholic primary schools and St Edmund's School closed. The religious orders of Dominican Sisters, Christian Brothers, and the Sisters of Mercy were the teaching foundation of the amalgamation. Brother Vincent Jury cfc was appointed as the first principal of the new college. He was the last of the 23 Christian Brother Principals to exercise authority in Rattray Street in the 115 years from 1876 to 1991. The decision to end the tradition of Catholic single-sex education in Dunedin (especially the closing of Moreau College) and to combine the Catholic secondary schools into a co-educational college was controversial especially in relation to senior staff appointments at the new college.

=== Campus ===
The college is located on the former sites and in the former buildings of St Paul's High School (formerly called Christian Brothers High School), the Christian Brothers Junior School and St Dominic's College, between Rattray and Tennyson streets, these three inner-city sites being adjacent to each other. The school tennis courts are on the other side of Rattray St between that street and Elm Row. This was the old site of St Joseph's Cathedral School founded in 1862 and, since 1990, located at 43 Elm Row.

Due to a lack of space, the college's junior classes (years 7 and 8) were accommodated at "south site" (formerly Moreau College) until 1993 when a new 18 classroom block was completed at a cost of $4 million. Further redevelopment in the 1990s saw the completion of a biology laboratory in an extended science block, the construction of a new auditorium accommodating 420 people and remodelled library, music studios and offices.

In 2011, the college expanded from its restricted main site by purchasing buildings and a carpark on the opposite side of Tennyson Street from Otago Polytechnic and thus increasing the area of the college by 25%. Two of the buildings were demolished, their sites becoming a green area used for school recreation. One of the buildings was kept and used for 6 classrooms. That building (on the corner of York Place) had a historic connection with important New Zealand artists such as Colin McCahon, Toss Woollaston, Doris Lusk and others as that was where they were trained. In 2024 after a "sympathetic restoration", the building became the new Arts Block for Trinity Catholic College.

=== Name ===
The college was first named Kavanagh College after the fourth Catholic Bishop of Dunedin John Patrick Kavanagh (Bishop, 1957–1985). That name was changed to Trinity Catholic College in 2023. This followed an investigation in which the church found Bishop Kavanagh "failed to take appropriate action over claims of abuse" and "had previously let survivors down badly". From the beginning of 2023, the college was renamed Trinity Catholic College. A dawn blessing for the school was held on 30 January 2023 to mark the change of name and acknowledge the historical mistakes made by the school's previous namesake. Bishop Michael Dooley stated that he hoped the blessing represented a beginning in the darkness which will work its way into the light. Bishop Dooley said earlier that "the new name for the college affirmed the Christian belief in the Trinity which is God revealed as Father, Son and Holy Spirit, a community of love." "This name reaffirms the Christian values and faith in God that are at the heart of the school's mission."

== Overview ==
=== Character ===
The college is named after the Holy Trinity. It is a large central city co-educational school which serves the entire city of Dunedin as the only Catholic secondary school in that city. It is an integrated school with a "special character" in terms of the Private Schools Conditional Integration Act 1975. This special character is broadly the connection of the school with the Catholic faith. Preference of enrolment is given to students who have established a link with the Catholic Church through baptism or membership of a parish. Preference is decided by the appropriate parish priest in each case. A preference certificate from the student's parish is required for each student with their application for enrolment at the school. Under the Act, the school may enrol "non-preference" students but the enrolment of such students is restricted to 5% of the total roll. The College does not have an enrolment scheme (commonly called zoning) which means that there is no restriction on enrolment because of a student's location of residence. The main contributing schools to the college are the Catholic parish schools of Dunedin. Enrolments come from both urban schools and rural schools.

=== Enrolment ===
As of July 2026, the school had roll of 867 students, of which 116 (13.4%) identify as Māori.

As of 2026, the school had an Equity Index of 431, placing it amongst schools whose students have below average socioeconomic barriers to achievement (roughly equivalent to decile 7 under the former socio-economic decile system).

=== Houses ===
The college has four houses which were set up to encourage unity and teamwork in the school. The colours and eponyms of the houses are:

- Rice - Green - Edmund Ignatius Rice, founder of the Christian Brothers;
- McAuley - Blue - Catherine McAuley, founder of the Sisters of Mercy;
- Dominic - Red - St Dominic, founder of the Dominican Sisters;
- Nagle - Yellow - Nano Nagle, eighteenth-century Irish lay religious and humanitarian.

=== Sport ===
The College participates in many sporting codes including Athletics, Cricket, Futsal, Rowing, Swimming, Orienteering, Tennis, Touch, Handball, Triathlon, Mini Volley, Volleyball, Waterpolo, Cross Country, Badminton, Basketball, Curling, Football, Hockey, Mini Hockey, Miniball, Netball and Rugby. Through its predecessor schools, the college has had a long and eventful history in Rugby Union, Soccer, Rugby League, Netball and Athletics. Trinity has a particular reputation as one of New Zealand's leading rowing schools.

=== Culture and performance ===
The college emphasises cultural accomplishment including visual arts, drama, music, dance, kapa haka, debating and participation in a Technical Team. A Cultural Awards ceremony is held annually to celebrate cultural achievement.

Each year, all Trinity College students are given the opportunity to participate in the annual musical in the cast, in the band, or as technical crew. The musicals performed have included:

- West Side Story (2002);
- Fame (2003);
- Godspell (2004);
- Les Misérables (2005);
- The Wiz (2006);
- The Boy Friend (2007);
- Footloose (2008);
- Disco Inferno (2009);
- Jesus Christ Superstar (2010);
- Grease (2011);
- Chicago (2012);
- Cabaret (2013);
- A Dream To Share (montage from past musicals) (2015);
- The Wizard of Oz (2016);
- Bugsy Malone (2017);
- Beauty and the Beast (2018);
- Annie (2019);
- Grease (2020);
- Seussical (2021);
- The Addams Family (2023);
- Joseph and the Amazing Technicolor Dreamcoat (2024);
- Back to the 80s (Songs from the 1980s) (2025)
- Disney's The Little Mermaid (2026)

The college art block (the former Dunedin Art School) has a suite of art, music and drama rooms, with the main building dedicated to music and art including a sound-proofed recording studio and practice rooms. The top floor, with natural light flooding in through the many windows, is used for training budding artists, echoing its traditional purpose. Drama rooms are in the adjoining one-story building.

=== Remembering ===
Trinity honours former students who died in war. Many former Christian Brothers students died on war service during the First World War. There were at least 83 war deaths from an average school attendance in 1893–1895 of 256 boys meaning that 32.42 percent of boys enrolled at that time died overseas in action. 49 ex-students of the Christian Brothers died in World War II and these are all listed in a roll of honour displayed in the College.

The silver jubilee (25 years) of the establishment of the merged college was celebrated on 25 October 2014 with a well-attended Mass at the Forsyth Barr Stadium, Dunedin. This was also a celebration of the sesquicentennial of Catholic education in Dunedin (150 years), with each of the city's parishes and schools participating. When Mass came to an end, a plaque honouring the college's three founding orders – the Christian Brothers, Dominican Sisters and Sisters of Mercy was blessed and subsequently placed at the college.

Trinity College celebrated 150 years of Catholic Secondary School Education in Dunedin in October 2026. In 1876, the Christian Brothers arrived in Dunedin and soon commenced secondary classes.

== Principals ==
	Name	Term	Notes
1	Bro. Vincent Innocent Jury c.f.c.	1989–1991	
2	Paul Ferris	1992–2010	
3	Tracy O'Brien	2010–2019	
4	Kate Nicholson	2019–present	

== Antecedents ==
=== St Joseph's School (1862) ===
The Otago settlement was established in 1848 and had an overwhelmingly Presbyterian character. There were very few Catholics there. However, in March 1861 gold was discovered at the Lindis Pass and Gabriel Read made public his successful discovery of gold at Tuapeka in June. The situation dramatically changed. Every steamer reaching Port Chalmers or Bluff was packed with would-be miners, many of whom were Catholics. Accordingly, Bishop Viard (Bishop of the Catholic diocese of Wellington in which Dunedin was included at that time) appointed Father Delphin Moreau SM, who had visited Otago in April 1859, to be its first resident priest. Mass was said in the courthouse until St Joseph's Church was completed in July 1862. In 1864 the Catholic population of Otago was estimated at over 15,000; chapels (many of them rough and ready) sprang up in the diggings and main towns, and schools came into existence. A school was opened in 1862 and was called St Joseph's School (now called St Joseph's Cathedral School). "When the old wooden Provincial Government buildings were replaced by new brick ones, the former were sold. Father Moreau secured some of them for his school. One large room was put on the side of the Rattray Street gully, below the church. It was divided into two parts – one for the boys and one for the girls. Other parts of the buildings were used as a coach house and stables. In 1864, the boys at the school were taught by Mr Shepherd and the girls were taught by Miss Campion. In 1870 Mr Shepherd still taught the boys and the girls were taught by Miss Conway. "Father Moreau took a great interest in the schools and was constantly among the children in the playground, always wearing his cassock which was green with age; he knew every child and was loved by them all. His hope was to obtain brothers and nuns to staff his schools."

=== St Dominic's College (1871–1976) ===
On Monday 20 February 1871, the Dominican Sisters who had arrived with the first Catholic Bishop of Dunedin, Patrick Moran, on 11 February, took charge of the girls' school. On 27 February St Dominic's College was opened. This school accommodated day pupils and a small number of boarders. There were 27 boarders in a total roll of approximately 200 in 1971, the centennial year of the school. The college existed in architectural splendour until 1976 being attached to the neo-Gothic St Dominic's Priory (completed 1877), one of leading architect Francis Petre's "earliest commissions and one of his finest works" and being adjacent to Petre's St. Joseph's Cathedral, Dunedin (completed 1886).

=== St Paul's High School (Christian Brothers School) (1876–1989) ===
On the morning of Sunday, 2 April 1876, four Irish Christian Brothers arrived in Dunedin at the invitation of Bishop Moran to establish a school for boys. "They were met by Bishop Moran and a group of Catholics and driven rapidly to Dunedin where, at 11.00 am Mass, Brothers Bodkin, Dunne, Healey and McMahon were introduced to the people." The school opened on 24 April 1876 with 129 pupils, under the leadership of Brother Fursey Bodkin. It provided a thorough primary education for boys. With the passage of the 1877 Education Act, the curriculum was gradually extended to include secondary subjects including Latin, French, higher mathematics and bookkeeping and selected students sat Matriculation exam for entrance into university. John Callan, MJ Hanrahan, James Liston and Hugh O'Neill were examples of such students. The school was known as St Joseph's Christian Brothers' School or Christian Brothers' School. The school's name was changed to Christian Brothers' High School in 1928 when the school was formally registered as a secondary school. In 1964 the school separated into two parts because of roll growth with the Christian Brothers' Junior School remaining on the old Tennyson Street site and the secondary section named St Paul's High School opening on new adjacent premises, fronting Rattray Street. The school celebrated its centennial in 1976. The Christian Brothers lived opposite the school. In 1989 the St Paul's High School site became the main part of the campus of the new coeducational Trinity College (then named Kavanagh College)

=== St Aloysius College, Wakari (1878–1883) ===
A short-lived secondary boarding and day school for boys was operated by the Jesuits at Wakari. The school was established by two Irish Jesuits, Joseph O'Malley and Thomas McEnroe, and had 15 boarders and 6 day pupils. It was promoted by Bishop Moran but was not popular. The site later became a golf course (the Balmacewen course of the Otago Golf Club). One of the holes (the 10th) is called "the monastery" in memory of the Jesuit connection.

=== St Philomena's College (1897–1976) ===
On the morning of Sunday, 17 January 1897, the Sisters of Mercy arrived in Dunedin from Ireland at the invitation of Michael Verdon the second Catholic Bishop of Dunedin. The sisters established themselves in South Dunedin and in April 1897 opened a high school for girls in McBride Street, South Dunedin. It was opened " ... with the very small roll of four pupils." This was the beginning of St Philomena's College. The school was originally known as St Philomena's Convent of Mercy High School.

=== St Edmund's School (1949–1989) ===
To help relieve the pressure on the Christian Brother's Rattray Street school roll a second school, St Edmund's, was opened in South Dunedin in 1949. This was a primary school for boys from about 9 years of age to 12 years of age (Standard 3 (Year 5) to Form 2 (Year 8)). The school closed as part of the reorganising of the Catholic schools in Dunedin in 1989. Years 7 and 8 became the junior classes of the new merged college and the junior classes (years 5 and 6) went to Dunedin Catholic primary schools.

=== Moreau College (1976–1989) ===
Early in the 1970s the roll numbers at both of Dunedin's Catholic girls' colleges, St Dominic's and St Philomena's, showed a slight reduction. At the same time, the demand for a greater variety of options for girls, particularly in the upper secondary classes, was gradually increasing so that it was becoming more difficult to maintain a full secondary school with a roll of less than 500. "It also had to be taken into account that the buildings at St Dominic's in Rattray Street were deteriorating and the cost of repair or renewal was considerable." The buildings at St Philomena's were newer and in a much better condition. It was therefore decided to merge the two schools on the St Philomena's site in 1976. The new college was called Moreau College after the first resident priest of Dunedin. Moreau College was closed in 1989 and its students joined the boys of St Paul's High School to form the new merged coeducational school, now called Trinity Catholic College, in Rattray St.

== Notable students and alumni ==
The following persons were educated at Trinity Catholic College or any of its predecessor schools.

=== The arts ===
- Winifred Kathleen Joan Davin – teacher, community worker, editor (St Dominic's)
- Anne Frandi-Coory (born 1948), writer and painter. (St Dominic's)
- Kylie Price – singer-songwriter
- Jordan Mullin – ballerina, Staatsballet Berlin

=== Business ===
- Patrick Hally (1866 – 21 July 1938), bootmaker and politician (Christian Brothers)
- Andrew Todd – businessman (Christian Brothers)
- Bryan Todd – businessman (Christian Brothers)

=== Church ===
- James Liston – archbishop (Christian Brothers)
- Peter McKeefry – cardinal (Christian Brothers)
- Hugh O'Neill – bishop (Christian Brothers)

=== Education ===
- Michael James Hanrahan (Brother Benignus) - Christian brother and administrator (Provincial) (Christian Brothers)

=== Journalism ===
- D. J. Cameron – journalist and sportswriter (Christian Brothers)
- Nora Kelly – journalist, poet and playwright (St Dominic's)
- Catherine Saunders ONZM (1942-2026) - broadcasting personality, public relations executive and radio producer (St Philomena's)

=== Politics, law and public service ===
- Margaret Austin – politician (St Dominic's)
- John Callan – judge (Christian Brothers)
- Mick Connelly – politician (Christian Brothers)
- Clare Curran – politician (Moreau)
- Marian Hobbs – politician (St Dominic's)
- Brigid Inder OBE – gender justice advocate and mediator (Moreau)
- Brian MacDonell – politician (Christian Brothers)
- Patrick O'Dea – public servant (Christian Brothers)
- Foss Shanahan – diplomat and public servant (Christian Brothers)
- Joe Walding – politician (Christian Brothers)
- David Wilson – parliamentary official (St Paul's)
- Michael Woodhouse – politician (St Paul's)

=== Science and medicine ===
- Morva Croxson – music therapist, university chancellor (St Dominics)
- Alexander Joseph McIlroy (26 May 1871 - 1 August 1925) – Medical Practitioner MD (Edin.) in New Zealand, (Christian Brothers and a founding pupil at St Patrick's College, Wellington)
- Kathleen Todd – child psychiatrist, philanthropist (St Dominic's)

=== Sport ===
- Nick Beard – cricketer
- Andrew Boyens – association footballer
- Michael Bracewell – cricketer
- William Butler – cricket player and umpire (Christian Brothers)
- Steve Casey – rugby union player (Christian Brothers)
- Sean Eathorne – cricketer
- Erika Fairweather – olympic swimmer
- John Flaherty (cricketer) (born 1942) – first-class cricketer for Otago (1964–65 and 1968–69) (Christian Brothers)
- Richard Fogarty – rugby union player (Christian Brothers)
- Samara Gallagher - NZ basketball
- Anthony Harris – cricketer
- Bert Lowe – boxer (Christian brothers)
- Zoe McBride – rower
- Brian McCleary – rugby union player and boxer (Christian Brothers)
- Craig Miller – wrestler
- Kilisitina Moata'ane – rugby union player
- Ti'i Paulo – rugby union player
- Kevin Skinner – rugby union player (Christian Brothers)
- Sio Tomkinson – rugby union player
- Lindsay Townsend – rugby union player (Christian Brothers)
- Ivan Walsh (1924 – 2005) - soccer player and cricketer (Christian Brothers)
