= Bryan Todd =

Bryan Todd may refer to:

- Bryan Todd (businessman) (1902–1987), New Zealand businessman in the oil, gas, and related industries
- Bryan Todd (record producer) (born 1973), American record producer and songwriter
- Bryan Todd (rugby league) (1938–2018), English rugby league footballer
