= Robert Todd =

Robert Todd may refer to:

- Robert Bentley Todd (1809–1860), Irish physician who described Todd's palsy
- Robert Todd (pioneer) (c. 1757–1814/20), Kentucky soldier and politician
- Robert C. Todd (c. 1809–1866), Canadian painter
- Robert Todd (field hockey) (born 1976), English field hockey player
- Robert H. Todd (born 1942), professor of mechanical engineering at Brigham Young University
- Robert Miles Todd, World War I flying ace
- Robert Smith Todd (1791–1849), father of U.S. first lady Mary Todd Lincoln
- Bob Todd (footballer) (born 1949), English footballer
- Bob Todd (baseball) (born 1948), college baseball coach
- Bobby Todd (1904–1980), German actor
- Robert Todd (filmmaker) (born 1963), American filmmaker
- Robert Asa Todd, California and Arizona journalist and member of the Los Angeles City Council
- Robert Barr Todd (1826–1901), justice of the Louisiana Supreme Court
- Robert Todd (comics), a fictional character from DC Comics

== See also ==
- Bob Todd (Brian Todd, 1921–1992), English comedy actor
- Robert E. Tod, commissioner of Ellis Island, 1921–1923
