= John Flaherty (cricketer) =

New Zealand cricketer (1942–2026)

Personal information
- Full name: John Patrick Flaherty
- Born: 4 August 1942; Dunedin, New Zealand
- Died: 16 August 2026 (aged 84); Dunedin, New Zealand
- Batting: Right-handed
- Bowling: Left-arm medium

Domestic team information
- Years: Team
- 1964–65 – 1968–69: Otago
- Source: ESPNcricinfo, 9 May 2016

John Patrick Flaherty (4 August 1942 – 16 August 2026) was a New Zealand cricketer. He played nine first-class matches for Otago between the 1964–65 and 1968–69 seasons.

Flaherty was born at Dunedin in 1942. He was educated at Christian Brothers High School in the city and played cricket at school and for Dunedin Cricket Club as a bowler. He played age-group and Second XI cricket for Otago from the 1963–64 season and for Dunedin Metropolitan from 1964 to 1965 before making his debut for Otago as an emergency replacement. Bowler Geoff Anderson and all-rounder Gren Alabaster were both injured during the side's tour of the North Island, and Flaherty was flown to Hamilton to open the bowling against Northern Districts at Hamilton in January 1965. He took four wickets on debut before going on to play against the touring Pakistanis later in the month and in Otago's final Plunket Shield match of the season, a home fixture against Wellington in early February.

Flaherty went on to play three first-class fixtures the following season and three in 1968–69. In total Flaherty took 13 wickets―the 4/52 he took on debut remained his best bowling analysis. He played his final first-class games in 1968–69 before touring with the New Zealand Ambassadors team.

Flaherty died in Dunedin on 16 August 2026, at the age of 84.
