= Europa (oil company) =

Europa was a New Zealand-owned oil company that was operated by the Todd family in New Zealand, in competition with overseas firms such as Texaco (now Caltex in NZ), Plume (now Mobil), Shell (now Z Energy) and Atlantic (now Mobil).

Starting in Dunedin (where the Todd family was based), in 1931 Charles Todd decided to import his own petrol. From 1933 the Europa brand of cheap imported petrol from the Soviet Union was sold through a chain of service stations across the country, in association with the New Zealand Farmer's Union and various regional Automobile Associations. Because of price undercutting by the overseas firms, the government introduced regulation of petrol prices from 1933.

In the early sixties the company was fined a large sum in a Transfer pricing scandal.

In 1972 British Petroleum NZ acquired a 60% interest in the company.

During this time, the company produced what was an award-winning television advert that featured American rock legend Stevie Ray Vaughan and New Zealand Blues legend Midge Marsden as part of the "Travellin' On" television adverts. The television adverts were shot mainly around the Central North Island of New Zealand during 1988.

This would be the last major television advert used until 1989 when the Europa brand was replaced with the BP shield.

== See also ==
- Bryan Todd (New Zealand)
- Todd Corporation
