= Lindsay Townsend =

New Zealand rugby union player (1934–2020)

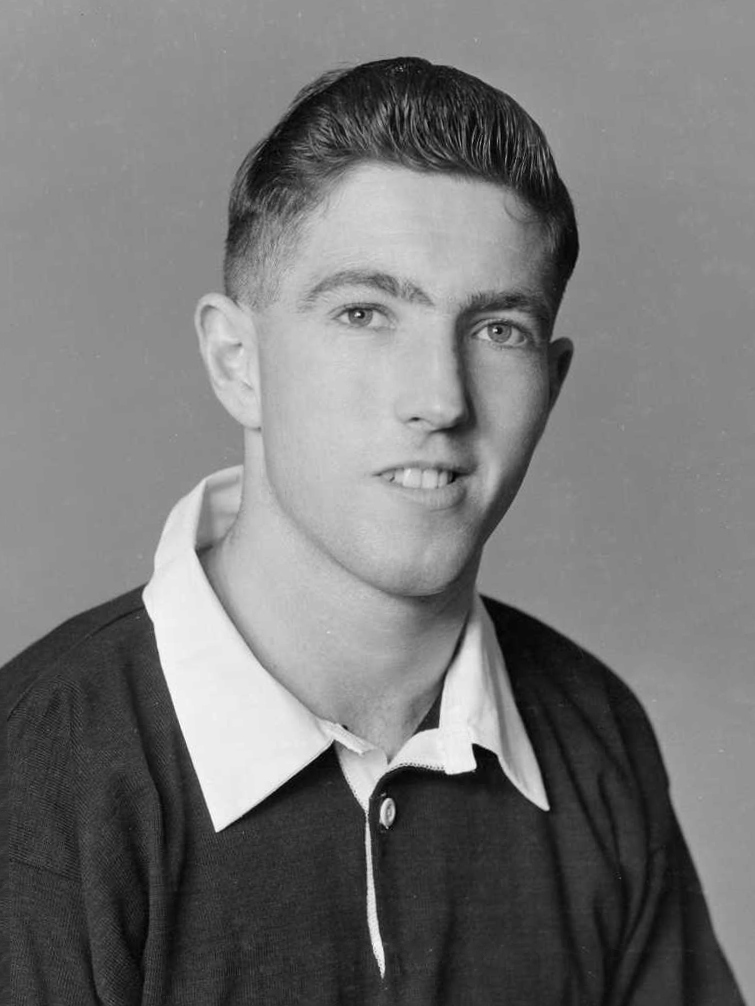
- Full name: Lindsay James Townsend
- Born: 3 March 1934 Mataura, New Zealand
- Died: 2 June 2020 (aged 86) Whangārei, New Zealand
- Height: 1.76 m (5 ft 9 in)
- Weight: 78 kg (12 st 4 lb)
- School: Christian Brothers School

Rugby union career
- Position: Half-back
Amateur team(s)
Years	Team	Apps	(Points)
- Southern
Provincial / State sides
Years	Team	Apps	(Points)
1953–1958	Otago		
1958–1963	North Auckland		
International career
Years	Team	Apps	(Points)
1955	New Zealand		

Lindsay James Townsend (3 March 1934 – 2 June 2020) was a New Zealand international rugby player. He was a member of the All Blacks in 1955, playing in the halfback position.

== Early life ==
Townsend was born in Mataura, New Zealand, and was educated at Christian Brothers School, Dunedin, where he played rugby.

== Senior rugby ==
Townsend played for the University club in 1953 and represented Otago in that year. From 1954 until 1957 he played for the Southern club in Dunedin. He then shifted to the North Island and played for the Kamo club and represented North Auckland in 1958–1963. He represented the South Island in 1954–1956 and was a New Zealand trialist 1956–1959. He played in the New Zealand XV in 1954 and 1955 and also played for the rest of New Zealand in the same years.

== All Black ==
Townsend was selected for the All Blacks in 1955. He played in Australia in the first and third tests and at home for New Zealand which were the only games he played for the All Blacks.

== Death ==
Townsend died in Whangārei on 2 June 2020.
