= Santa Rosa Correctional Institution =

Prison in Milton, Florida, United States

Coordinates: 30°38′47″N 86°57′58″W

- Interactive map of Santa Rosa Correctional Institution
- Location: 5850 E Milton Road Milton, Florida, U.S.
- Status: mixed
- Capacity: 3,092 (1,614 + 1,478)
- Opened: 1996
- Managed by: Florida Department of Corrections

Santa Rosa Correctional Institution is a state prison for men located in Milton, Santa Rosa County, Florida, United States, owned and operated by the Florida Department of Corrections. The facility opened in 1996 with a mix of security levels and a capacity of 1,614. It is often considered one of the "toughest" and "most dangerous" prisons in the state of Florida.

The adjacent Santa Rosa Correctional Institution Annex opened in 2006, and houses another 1,478 inmates at the same security levels.

Also nearby is the privately operated Blackwater River Correctional Facility with Florida state inmates.

== Notable Inmates ==
Inmate Name	Register Number	Status	Details
Anthony Todt	A81496	Serving a life sentence without parole.	Murdered his wife, three children, and dog, in 2019 in what is known as the Todt family murders.
