= Justice Todd =

Justice Tod or Todd may refer to:

- Debra Todd (born 1957), associate justice of the Supreme Court of Pennsylvania
- George Tod (judge) (1773–1841), associate justice of the Supreme Court of Ohio
- John Tod (1779–1830), associate justice of the Supreme Court of Pennsylvania
- John J. Todd (born 1927), associate justice of the Minnesota Supreme Court
- Robert Barr Todd (1826–1901), associate justice of the Louisiana Supreme Court
