= Sean Eathorne =

New Zealand cricketer (born 1986)

Personal information
- Full name: Sean William Eathorne
- Born: 5 May 1986 (age 40); Dunedin, Otago, New Zealand
- Batting: Right-handed
- Bowling: Right-arm off-break

Domestic team information
- Years: Team
- 2004/05–2016/17: Otago
- 2009/10–2010/11: North Otago

Career statistics
Competition	FC	LA	T20
Matches	11	9	5
Runs scored	187	186	4
Batting average	9.84	31.00	4.00
100s/50s	0/0	0/0	0/0
Top score	28	41	4
Balls bowled	–	24	–
Wickets	–	2	–
Bowling average	–	14.00	–
5 wickets in innings	–	0	–
10 wickets in match	–	0	–
Best bowling	–	2/28	–
Catches/stumpings	7/–	1/–	3/–
- Source: CricketArchive, 27 February 2024

Sean William Eathorne (born 5 May 1986) is a New Zealand former cricketer. He played for the New Zealand national under-19 cricket team at the 2004 Under-19 Cricket World Cup. He played domestically for Otago between the 2004–05 and 2016–17 seasons.

Eathorne was born at Dunedin in 1986 and educated at Kavanagh College in the city.
