= Todt =

Todt is a German surname.

== Surname ==
People with the Todt surname include:

- Anthony Todt (born 1975), American mass murderer (2019 Todt family murders)
- Emil Todt (c. 1810–1900), German artist and sculptor
- Fritz Todt (1891–1942), German engineer; founder of Nazi agency Organisation Todt
- Hans Jürgen Todt (born 1937), German athlete
- Jean Todt (born 1946), French executive and co-driver
- Jens Todt (born 1970), German footballer
- Nicolas Todt (born 1977), French motorsport team owner
- Phil Todt (1901–1973), American baseball player
- Reinhard Todt (1949–2025), Austrian politician

== Other uses ==
Todt may also refer to:

- Organisation Todt, a German civil and military engineering group
- Todt Battery, German World War II coastal artillery site in Calais, France
- Todt family murders, 2019 familicide in Florida, United States
- Todt Hill, a small mountain ridge on Staten Island, New York
