= Kylie Price =

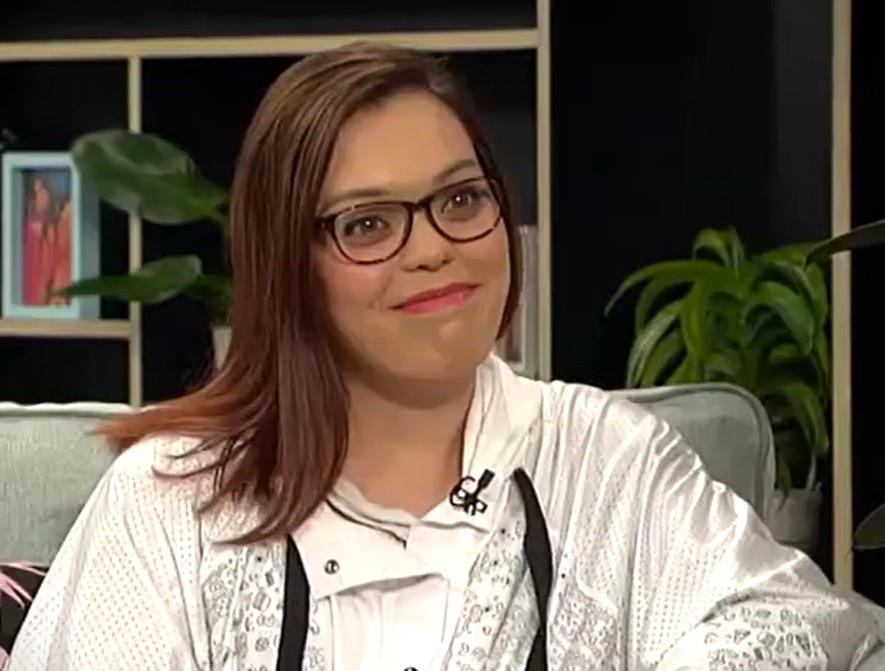
- Price in 2017

Background information
- Born: Kylie Price; 1993 (age 31–32)
- Origin: Dunedin, New Zealand
- Genres: Country, Gospel, Pop
- Occupation: Singer-songwriter,
- Instrument(s): Vocals, guitar
- Years active: 2011—Present
- Website: www.kylieprice.co.nz

Kylie Price (born 1993) is a New Zealand singer-songwriter.

== Early life ==
Price spent her childhood in Dunedin and was educated at Kavanagh College.

== Career ==
In 2011, Kylie Price won Good Morning's "Find A Star" competition.

In 2012, she entered New Zealand's Got Talent but refused to sign their contracts leading to her exit from the show. Later that year she won several awards at the Australasian country music awards.

== Awards and nominations ==
Year	Nominee / work	Award	Result
2011	Kylie Price	Good Morning's "Find A Star" competition	Won
2011	Kylie Price	Overall Talent Quest Winner	Won
2011	Kylie Price	Overall Senior Quest Winner	Won
2011	Kylie Price	Senior female vocal quest	Won
2011	Kylie Price	Tamworth Songwriter's Association award	Won
