= Andrew Todd =

Andrew Todd may refer to:

- Andrew Todd (bowls) (born 1966), New Zealand bowler
- Andrew Todd (businessman) (1904–1976), New Zealand figure in the car assembly industry
- Andrew Todd (fur trader) (1754–1796), Ulster merchant and fur trader in Montréal and Louisiana
- Andrew Todd (rower) (born 1989), Canadian Paralympic rower
- Andrew Todd (rugby union)
- Andrew L. Todd Sr. (1872–1945), American lawyer, educator and member of the Tennessee General Assembly
- Andy Todd (footballer, born 1974), English football player for Bolton, Charlton, Blackburn, Derby and Perth Glory
- Andy Todd (footballer, born 1979), English football player for Rotherham and Mansfield
- Andy Todd (musician) (born 1964), English musician
- Andy Todd (rugby league), footballer for Scotland, and Edinburgh Eagles

== See also ==
- Andrew Tod (disambiguation)
