= Catherine Saunders =

New Zealand broadcasting personality (1942–2026)

Catherine Saunders ONZM
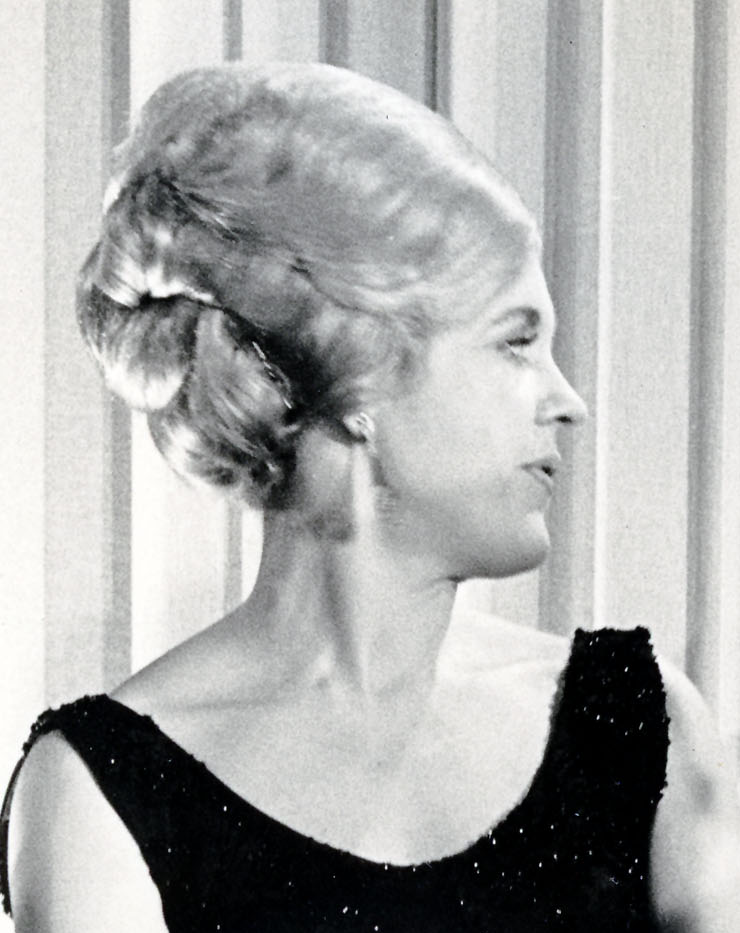
- Saunders, c. 1970
- Born: Catherine Rosaleen Dowling; 4 April 1942; Dunedin, New Zealand
- Died: 22 March 2026 (aged 83); Auckland, New Zealand
- Education: St Philomena's School
- Occupations: Broadcaster; public relations executive
- Known for: Tonight with Cathy Saunders

Catherine Rosaleen Saunders ONZM (nee Dowling; 4 April 1942 – 22 March 2026) was a New Zealand broadcasting personality, public relations executive and radio producer.

== Early life and education ==
Saunders was born in Dunedin on 4 April 1942, to Anthony John Dowling and Kathleen Mary Dowling (née Whelan), and had two older brothers. Her father was a Catholic lawyer, and her mother a pianist. Saunders attended St Philomena's School (now Trinity Catholic College). Saunders spent two years training as a teacher before deciding not to continue.

== Career ==
Saunders auditioned as a radio announcer in 1961. She started at Dunedin TV in 1962, and worked as a journalist throughout the 1960s. She appeared on the 1960s magazine show Town and Around, and was a long-standing panelist on Selwyn Toogood’s panel advice show Beauty and the Beast, where they discussed controversial subjects such as open adoption, contraception and sexual abuse. Saunders was the commentator for the Mobil Song Quest in 1965, when it was won by Kiri Te Kanawa. She recalled later "I was only allowed to talk about the women's hair, their clothing, and the floral decorations in the hall". Saunders campaigned alongside Silvia Cartwright, Donna Awatere Huata and Margaret Wilson for equal pay and opportunities for women.

She moved into public relations and marketing in 1969. She worked for the New Zealand Dairy Board until 1983, followed by the Auckland Visitors Bureau and Griffon & Saunders Public Relations, after which she ran her own public relations company. Saunders marketed butter, Daffodil Day and led the Dairy Board’s highly successful 'Bigger Block of Cheese' campaign.

In the 1980s, Saunders hosted the television show Tonight With Cathy Saunders, co-hosted the chat show Saunders and Sinclair with Geoff Sinclair. She had her own slot on Radio New Zealand, and for five years produced Top Of the Morning.

== Death ==
Saunders died in Auckland on 22 March 2026, at the age of 83.

== Awards and honours ==
In the 2001 Queen's Birthday Honours, Saunders was appointed an Officer of the New Zealand Order of Merit, for services to broadcasting and the community.
