= Brigid Inder =

Gender equality advocate

Brigid Inder OBE
- Education: University of Otago
- Awards: Officer of the Order of the British Empire, Bertha von Suttner Peace Prize, honorary doctor of the University of Otago

Brigid Anne Inder OBE is a New Zealand gender justice advocate and mediator. In 2014, Inder was appointed an Officer of the Order of the British Empire for services to women’s rights and international justice, and was awarded the inaugural Bertha von Suttner Peace Prize.

== Early life and education ==
Inder lived in Queenstown and moved to Dunedin when she was six years old. She was educated at Moreau College (now Trinity Catholic College), where she was head girl in 1983. Inder completed a Bachelor of Physical Education at the University of Otago in 1987, and then worked for the YWCA as a youth worker.

== Career ==
In 2004 Inder co-founded the Women's Initiatives for Gender Justice (WIGJ), an international women's rights organisation that supports legal actions against gender violence through the International Criminal Court (ICC) and peace processes. She was Executive Director until 2017.

In addition to her work at WIGJ, Inder was a Special Advisor on Gender to the International Criminal Court Prosecutor from 2012 to 2016, and co-wrote and developed their Policy on Sexual and Gender-based Crimes. This was the first policy of this kind developed by any international court or tribunal. In 2021 Inder joined Mediators Beyond Borders International.

== Honours and awards ==
In the 2014 Birthday Honours Inder was appointed an Officer of the Order of the British Empire for services to women’s rights and international justice. The same year she was awarded the inaugural Bertha von Suttner Peace Prize.

Inder was inducted into the School of Physical Education, Sport and Exercise Sciences Hall of Fame at Otago University in 2019, and awarded an honorary Doctor of Laws.
