= Michael Todd =

Michael or Mike Todd may refer to:

- Mike Todd (1909–1958), American film producer
- Mike Todd Jr. (1929–2002), son of American film producer Mike Todd and stepson to Elizabeth Taylor
- Michael J. Todd (1957–2008), British police officer
- Michael Todd (musician) (born 1980), American bass guitarist
- Michael Todd (video game developer) (born 1987), Canadian video game developer
- Michael Todd (artist) (born 1935), American artist
- Michael Todd (rugby union), Scottish rugby union referee
- Michael Todd (politician), American politician
- Michael Todd (astronomer), Australian astronomer who has discovered several minor planets
- Mike Todd, an American rap/hip-hop musician and member of Transformation Worship
