= William Todd =

William Todd may refer to:

- Bill Todd (William Laurence Todd), NASA program manager and aquanaut
- Billy Todd (1929–2008), singer
- Will Todd (born 1970), English composer and pianist
- William E. Todd (born 1962), United States ambassador to Cambodia
- William Frederick Todd (1854–1935), Canadian politician
- William Gowan Todd (1820–1877), Catholic priest, author, and humanitarian
- William H. Todd (1864–1932), American shipbuilder
- William L. Todd (1818–1876), creator of the flag of California
- William Todd (businessman) (1803–1873), American businessman, Canadian senate nominee
- William Todd (soldier) (1739–1810), American soldier and politician
- Captain William Todd (1876-1915) Scottish soldier and architect
- William Andrew Todd (2002-present), Canadian entrepreneur
