= Todd, Missouri =

Extinct hamlet in Missouri, U.S.

Coordinates: 38.31780°N 92.98547°W

Todd is an extinct town in Morgan County, in the U.S. state of Missouri.

A post office called Todd was established in 1885, and remained in operation until 1917. Jonathan Todd, an early postmaster, gave the community his last name.
