= John Callan =

New Zealand judge and Supreme Court Justice from 1935 to 1951

John Callan KC
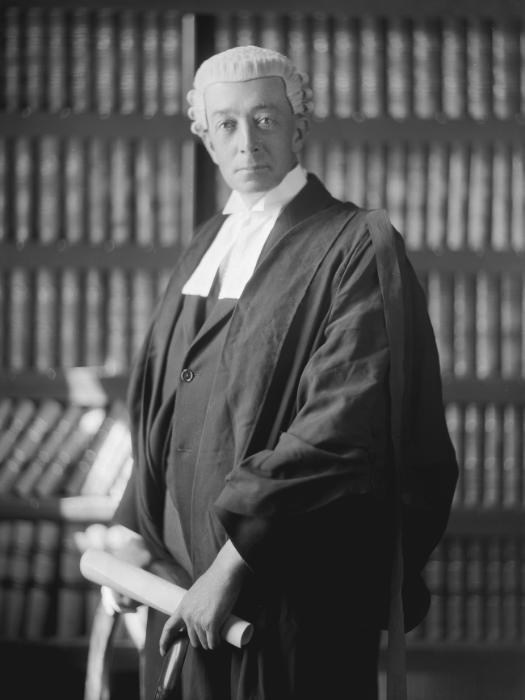
- John Callan in 1934

Justice of the Supreme Court
- In office 1935–51

Personal details
- Born: 15 August 1882 Dunedin, New Zealand
- Died: 12 February 1951 (aged 68) Auckland, New Zealand
- Spouse: Margaret Elizabeth Callan (née Mowat)
- Relations: John Callan (father); Charles Gavan Duffy; Frank Gavan Duffy; George Gavan Duffy
- Children: One son

John Bartholomew Callan KC (15 August 1882 – 12 February 1951) was a New Zealand judge. He was a Justice of the Supreme Court (now known as the High Court of New Zealand) (1935–51).

== Early life ==
Callan was the son of John Bartholomew Callan, a Dunedin lawyer and member of the New Zealand Legislative Council. He was born on 15 August 1882, five years after his family's arrival in New Zealand from Australia. The Callans had migrated from Ireland to Australia with the Gavan Duffy family and Callan was descended from Charles Gavan Duffy. He was educated at the Christian Brothers School in Dunedin (where he was Dux in 1897) and commenced his law studies before the Law Faculty of the University of Otago came into being. His principal instructor was James Garrow, a well-known New Zealand legal scholar. On 10 July 1913, at the North East Valley Roman Catholic Church, Dunedin, Callan married Margaret Elizabeth, daughter of James Dugald Mowat, a Dunedin stationer, and they had one son.

== Lawyer ==
After graduating BA and LL.B at the University of Otago, Callan entered his father's office (Callan and Gallaway) and became a partner in the firm when his father was appointed to the New Zealand Legislative Council in 1907. He was appointed a lecturer in law at Otago University in 1912. During World War I, Callan served in the New Zealand Expeditionary Force and became a captain. On his returned to Dunedin he continued his law practice. He also became Dean of the Faculty of Law at the University of Otago and he resumed his lectures in Torts there. Callan took silk in 1934, and he moved to Wellington.

In 1935, he was awarded the King George V Silver Jubilee Medal.

== On the bench ==
Callan was appointed a Justice in the Supreme Court in 1935 and went to Auckland as a resident Judge. As a Judge, apart from the normal case load, Justice Callan also undertook Government investigations on the Aliens Tribunal and on the leakage of information (both relevant to World War II). Callan also contributed on a wider stage. Apart from his ten years as Dean of the Faculty of Law at the University of Otago (1924–34), he was also a member of the Council of Legal Education.

== Judicial character ==
Callan was recognised as one of the most kind and erudite judges of his era. He was characterised by his interest in detail in his cases. "He observed every facet of a case and frequently made comments that were reported in the press". He was much given to asking questions during a legal argument. "He had also a keen dramatic sense. His favourite leisure occupation seemed to be the recital in detail of matters grave or gay in some case with which he had been concerned either as counsel or Judge." He once observed that practice at the bar encouraged self-expression. But that, as the judges were recruited from the bar, such experts in self-expression were, as judges, put in a place where their greatest virtue was to be able to hold their tongues.

== Catholic layman ==
Callan was a Catholic and was a leading layman for the New Zealand church. He was a close friend of James Michael Liston, the Catholic Bishop of Auckland. They had been contemporaries at the Christian Brothers School in Dunedin and like Liston, Callan had continued a close association with the Christian Brothers. For example, when in 1939 Liston opened the new Christian Brother's school, St Peter's College, Auckland, Callan sat on the podium with the bishop, representing the ex-pupils of the brothers. In 1922, (while still practising in Dunedin) Callan provided legal advice to Liston when the latter was charged with sedition. When Pope Pius XII stated that Catholic judges should not play any part in divorce cases, a disturbed Callan indicated that he was prepared to resign but decided, after discussion with Liston, that the Pope's statement did not apply to New Zealand as "divorce could be understood to refer to the civil contract of marriage rather than to the sacrament of matrimony". In spite of this decision, Callan remained a close friend of Liston until his death.

== Death ==
Callan died in Auckland on 12 February 1951 at the age of 69. He was survived by his wife and his son. His Requiem Mass was celebrated by Liston at St Patrick's Cathedral and as his cortege left the cathedral, it passed through a guard of honour formed by boys from St Peter's College.
