= Bryan Todd (businessman) =

New Zealand businessman

Sir Bryan Todd
- Born: Bryan James Todd; 8 September 1902; Heriot, New Zealand
- Died: 29 May 1987 (aged 84); Wellington, New Zealand
- Spouse: Helen Ann Rollo Buddo
- Children: Three daughters
- Parent(s): Charles Todd; Mary Hegarty
- Relatives: Charles Todd (father); Charles P. Todd (brother); Desmond Todd (brother); Kathleen Todd (sister); Moyra Todd (sister); Andrew Todd (brother); Sheila Todd (sister); John Todd (nephew); Gordan Tait (son-in-law); David Buddo (father-in-law)

Sir Bryan James Todd (8 September 1902 – 29 May 1987) was one of four brothers who built one of New Zealand's biggest industrial and commercial enterprises. He was an important figure in the development of the New Zealand oil and gas energy industry and, incidentally, in the development of New Zealand tax law.

== Early life ==
Todd was born in Heriot, Otago in 1902. His grandfather was Charles Todd (1834–1892), a Scottish immigrant who had arrived in New Zealand with his wife, Mary O'Sullivan, in 1870. Charles worked at wool-scouring in Milton and gold-mining at Table Hill, Blue Spur and then Bendigo, all in Otago. In 1884, Charles commenced a fellmongery business at Heriot, Otago. The Todd Group was commenced in Heriot when Bryan Todd's father, also named Charles Todd (1868-1942), from 1888 expanded the fellmongery into a successful stock and station business. He imported the district's first car in 1908 and in 1913 established a garage which later expanded into the Todd Motor Company.

Todd commenced his primary education at the local Heriot School. In February 1915, Charles Todd, his wife Mary Hegarty and their seven children (Charles Patrick (CP), Desmond, Kathleen, Moyra, Bryan, Andrew and Sheila) shifted to Dunedin where Bryan Todd attended the Christian Brothers School. When he was older, he was sent to Sydney to board at Saint Ignatius' College, Riverview.

== Business ==
By the 1920s three of Charles' four sons, Desmond, Bryan and Andrew, were running branches of the Todd Motor Company in Dunedin, Christchurch and Auckland, By 1934 Andrew Todd had moved to Wellington to run a new Petone plant assembling Hillman and Humber cars and commercial vehicles. The Mitsubishi franchise was acquired in 1970 when planning for New Zealand's biggest assembly plant was under way, and in 1975 Todd Park was opened at Porirua.

Bryan Todd set the scene for the group's later diversification into a range of interests – which included oil distribution, refining, and exploration, natural gas, forestry, finance, aviation, ironsands export, and land and property development – when a 1929 Petrol price war in Christchurch saw supplies cut off to the Todd garages because the petrol companies were setting up their own tied garages selling only their own petroleum products. Bryan Todd decided expanding world sources had created an opportunity for a fourth company to market petroleum products in New Zealand. In August 1931 the Associated Motorists' Petrol Company (AMPCO) was formed with the support of automobile clubs with his father Charles Todd as chairman. AMPCO marketed its products under the name "Europa Oil". By March 1933 bulk terminals had been built, a national retail network established and Europa petrol was on sale.

Europa Marketing and Europa Refining were sold to British Petroleum in 1972. The group's participation in the oil business did not end with the sale of Europa. In 1954 it had acquired prospecting licences in the North and South Islands and entered joint venture exploration agreements with Shell and BP in 1955, 1956 and 1961. The consortium's successes included the Kapuni onshore field in 1959 and in 1969 the Maui off-shore gas-condensate field.

The Todd group continues to be involved in these and other gas-condesate projects such as the Pohokura gas discovery in 2000 in which Todd has a 26% share. However, Bryan Todd's dream of a major New Zealand oil discovery has never been fulfilled.

== Tax problems ==
Europa was always hampered by the fact it had to get its supplies from other companies, often themselves in competition with Europa in the New Zealand retail market. For this reason, Bryan Todd searched to set up an independent refining operation either in New Zealand or overseas.

In 1954 Bryan Todd entered into an arrangement with Gulf Oil to acquire petroleum products. That company did not give Europa any reduction on "posted prices". However, an arrangement was entered into under which the two companies established a refining company in The Bahamas known as Pan Eastern Refining Company. It purchased crude oil from Gulf at the standard posted price, arranged to have the oil refined by Gulf at one of its refineries, for a fee of 47.5c per barrel, and sold the refined petrol to Europa and the other products ("heavy ends") to Gulf, all at the posted prices. Depending on various factors, Pan Eastern made a profit of 50c for every barrel of crude oil refined, or about 5c for every gallon of petrol Europa purchased. This profit was shared between Gulf and Europa.

Under New Zealand tax law, dividends from Pan Eastern Refining were not counted as income of Europa itself; tax was only levied on Europa's dividends to its shareholders. However, the New Zealand Tax Department (Inland Revenue Department) ruled that the arrangements amounted to a discount off the posted price Europa paid for its supplies from Gulf. Its taxable profit was therefore correspondingly greater than had been declared by Europa, and its taxable income was therefore increased accordingly for all the tax years 1959–1965. The extra tax demanded from Europa was over £NZ2,000,000. Inland Revenue considered that the Pan Eastern arrangement amounted to an evasion of tax. Europa disputed this.

After hearings in the High Court and the Court of Appeal the issue went to the Privy Council (at that time New Zealand's highest court) which decided in Inland Revenue's favour (in a split 3-2 decision). In 1971, on the basis of the Privy Council decision, the Inland Revenue claimed the extra tax and accrued penalties in respect of the tax years 1959-1965 (a total of $NZ6,714,829.34) which was paid and claimed for the tax years 1966-1971 (the latter years were not part of the case). Europa objected in respect of the years 1966–1971.

After High Court and Court of Appeal decisions, the matter ended up again before the Privy Council. This time the Privy Council (split 4-1) decided for Europa Oil accepting that the arrangements for 1965-1971 were different from those for 1959–1965. (A new company, Todd Refining, had been interposed and had the obligation to purchase from Pan Eastern, Europa itself had no obligation to buy any product from Todd Refining, and the Privy Council did not go behind the corporate veil to look at the reality of Todd family ownership interest in these entities.) This led to a different conclusion. Europa received a tax refund of $NZ4,000,000. "Bryan [Todd] and his team ... had carried on the fight through 13 years and six court hearings". "As Bryan [Todd] was fond of quoting, 'The meek and the humble of heart shall inherit the earth. But the strong and the brave are the ones you put your money on!'".

== Other interests ==
An active sportsman, Todd was a director of Ruapehu Alpine Lifts, the company formed by skiing enthusiasts to develop the Whakapapa ski fields on Mount Ruapehu, and listed shooting, sailing and golf as other interests. A Wellington City Councillor from 1941 till 1946 and airport committee chairman from 1943 till 1946,

Todd privately and anonymously supported many charities as well as publicly chairing the Todd Charitable Trust established in 1960 and the Todd Foundation which followed in 1972. Both bodies give annual support to medical research, youth organisations, cultural and educational groups, the elderly, disabled and handicapped and other worthy causes. In the 1976 Queen's Birthday Honours, Todd was appointed a Knight Bachelor, for services to commerce and the community.

== Family and death ==
Todd was married to Helen Ann Rollo Buddo, cousin and adopted daughter of David Buddo, a rich Canterbury run-holder. Buddo, whose station was at Fernside, Rangiora, was one of Canterbury's best-known farmer-politicians of the Liberal era. Todd died on 29 May 1987. In 1994, he was posthumously inducted into the New Zealand Business Hall of Fame.

== Bibliography ==
- Galbreath, Ross (2010). Enterprise and Energy: The Todd Family of New Zealand. Wellington: Todd. ISBN 9781869341121.
