= John Todd (businessman) =

New Zealand businessman

Sir John Todd KNZM
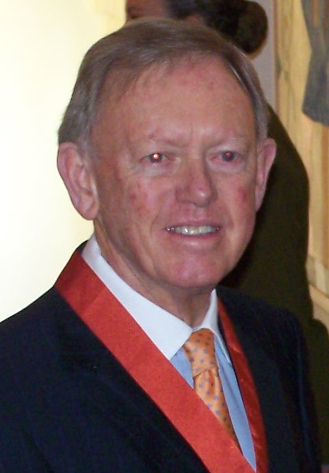
- Todd in 2009
- Born: John Desmond Todd; 12 February 1927; Wellington, New Zealand
- Died: 29 July 2015 (aged 88); Wellington, New Zealand
- Relatives: Charles Todd (grandfather); Kathleen Todd (aunt); Bryan Todd (uncle); Andrew Todd (uncle)

Sir John Desmond Todd KNZM (12 February 1927 – 29 July 2015) was a New Zealand businessman and philanthropist who was head of the Todd Corporation.

His was educated at Wellesley College of which he was dux in 1943 (at that time Wellesley College had a secondary department). He later completed a degree in accountancy and commerce at Victoria University of Wellington.

Todd was a Founding trustee of the Arts Foundation of New Zealand, and served as a trustee for the Royal New Zealand Ballet and the Queen Elizabeth II Arts Council.

In 2011, Todd was inducted into the New Zealand Business Hall of Fame. He was made a Knight Companion of New Zealand Order of Merit in the 2012 New Year Honours, for services to business, having previously been appointed a Companion of New Zealand Order of Merit in the 2009 Queen's Birthday Honours.
