= Jack Todd (footballer, born 1879) =

Australian rules footballer

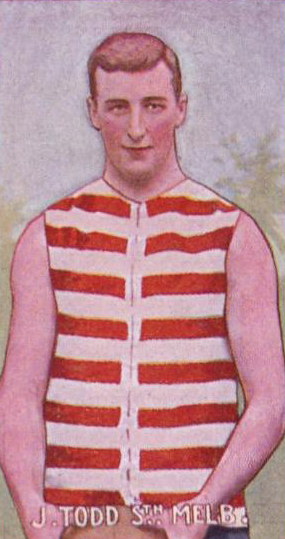
- Cigarette card of Todd in 1906

Personal information
- Full name: John Holt Todd
- Born: 29 April 1879; Prahran, Victoria
- Died: 27 September 1960 (aged 81); Ascot, Queensland
- Original team: Brighton

Playing career^{1}
Years	Club	Games (Goals)
1898	St Kilda	1 (0)
1903	South Melbourne	7 (0)
Total		8 (0)
- ^{1} Playing statistics correct to the end of 1803.

John Holt Todd (29 April 1879 – 27 September 1960) was an Australian rules footballer who played with St Kilda and South Melbourne in the Victorian Football League (VFL).

Todd moved to Queensland after his playing career was over. He became a farmer and a bookmaker in the ensuing years.
