= Todd Howard (disambiguation) =

Todd Howard (born 1970) is an American video game designer, director, and producer.

Todd Howard may also refer to:

- Todd Howard (American football) (born 1965), American football linebacker and coach
- Todd Howard (basketball) (born 1970), American college basketball coach
- Todd Howard (TV personality) (born 1965), American entrepreneur
- Toddy Tee, American rapper
