= Michael Todd (politician) =

American politician

Member-elect of the Missouri House of Representatives from the 32nd district
- Assuming office January 6, 2027
- Succeeding: Jeff Coleman

Personal details
- Party: Republican
- Education: University of Central Missouri

Michael Todd is an American politician of the Missouri Republican Party who is the representative-elect for the 32nd district in the Missouri House of Representatives. He was elected in the 2026 general election.
