= Jack Todd (footballer, born 1881) =

Australian rules footballer

Personal information
- Full name: John Herbert Hollick Todd
- Born: 15 April 1881; North Melbourne, Victoria
- Died: 14 May 1962 (aged 81); Parkville, Victoria
- Original team: Carlton Juniors / Prahran (VFA)

Playing career^{1}
Years	Club	Games (Goals)
1901–02	Carlton	4 (0)
- ^{1} Playing statistics correct to the end of 1902.

John Herbert Hollick Todd (15 April 1881 – 14 May 1962) was an Australian rules footballer who played with Carlton in the Victorian Football League (VFL).

== Notes ==
- Jack Todd's playing statistics from AFL Tables
- Jack Todd at AustralianFootball.com
- Jack Todd's profile at Blueseum
