= Kathleen Todd =

New Zealand child psychiatrist

- Born: Kathleen Mary Gertrude Todd; 19 November 1898; Heriot, New Zealand
- Died: 22 March 1968 (aged 69); Wellington, New Zealand
- Parent(s): Charles Todd; Mary Hegarty
- Relatives: Charles Todd (father); Charles P. Todd (brother); Desmond Todd (brother); Moyra Todd (sister); Bryan Todd (brother); Andrew Todd (brother); Sheila Todd (sister); John Todd (nephew)

Kathleen Mary Gertrude Todd (19 November 1898 – 21 March 1968) was the first New Zealand woman to specialist in child psychiatry.

== Early life ==
Kathleen Todd was born in 1898 in Heriot, Otago. She was one of the seven children of Charles Todd, an auctioneer and stock and station agent who founded the firm that became the Todd Corporation, and his wife Mary Hegarty. Todd was educated at St Dominic's College, Dunedin, and was dux in 1915. In 1917 she proceeded to the University of Otago to study medicine, graduating (M.B.Ch.B) in 1923.

== Career ==
Todd spent 1925 as a locum in Rāwene working for George McCall Smith. Professional options for women doctors were limited in New Zealand at that time so she carried out further studies in Vienna and London hospitals and did further courses and worked in Boston and Oakland, California in psychological medicine and maternal and child health. She obtained a Diploma in Psychological Medicine (DPM) in London in 1929.

Todd returned to New Zealand in 1929 becoming the first woman child psychiatrist in the country. She worked at the Auckland Mental Hospital in Avondale from 1930 to 1935 where she assessed children for institutionalisation under the Mental Defectives Amendment Act. After being passed over for promotion she returned to London. She worked in the Tavistock Clinic (where she had worked in the 1920s), at the Hill End Hospital for Mental and Nervous Diseases, in private practice, and as director of the London Child Guidance Training Centre. Ill-health prompted her to return to New Zealand in 1946 and from 1949 to 1963 she was a consultant in Lower Hutt.

Todd became a Member of the British Psychological Society in 1938 and a Fellow in 1942; a Fellow of the Royal Society of Medicine in 1941; a Member of the Royal Medico Psychological Association in 1943, the first woman to become a member.

== Personal life ==
Todd shared in the considerable wealth of the Todd family as her father made a point of spreading shareholdings amongst his children and to his wife (although the males got bigger parcels than the females). When Todd and her sister Moyra Todd were living in Hampstead their well-ordered household included servants and "Brett the butler".

== Death and legacy ==
Todd died in Lower Hutt on 21 March 1968.

Todd used her considerable means to establish Fellowships to assist young psychiatrists in postgraduate study in London, one per year from 1962. She intended the money, GBP600 ($24,000 in 2012) per year for three years, to pay for a personal psychoanalysis and assist with a broad experience of European culture. She stipulated that Kathleen Todd Fellows return to New Zealand to private practice. Brian Barraclough MD FRACP was the first Fellow 1962-64.

== Bibliography ==
- Galbreath, Ross (2010). Enterprise and Energy: The Todd Family of New Zealand. Wellington: Todd.
