= Todt family murders =

2019 crime in Celebration, Florida

- The victims, (L–R) Tyler, Zoey, Megan and Aleksander Todt, c. 2016
- Location: 28.33046°N 81.52370°W; Celebration, Florida, United States
- Date: December 2019
- Attack type: Positional asphyxia and stabbing
- Deaths: 4 people 1 dog
- Victims: Megan Todt (aged 42); Aleksander Todt (aged 13); Tyler Todt (aged 11); Zoe Todt (aged 4); Breezy (family dog)
- Perpetrator: Anthony Todt
- Motive: Unclear
- Charges: First degree murder (4 counts); Animal cruelty (1 count)
- Convictions: Homicide and animal cruelty
- Convicted: Anthony Todt (life imprisonment)

The Todt family murders were a multiple homicide case that occurred in December 2019 in the master-planned community of Celebration, in Osceola County, Florida, United States. Anthony "Tony" Todt, a physical therapist from Connecticut, confessed to the murders of his family, which included his wife, Megan, their three children, Alek, Tyler, and Zoe, and their family dog, Breezy. At the time of the events, a federal warrant for healthcare fraud charges had led authorities to raid Anthony's physical therapy clinic in Colchester, Connecticut. On January 9, 2020, authorities issuing the warrant found Todt living in his house with the badly decomposed bodies of his family. In 2022, Anthony Todt was convicted of the murders and given four consecutive life sentences without the possibility of parole. An additional year was added for the killing of their family dog, deemed an act of animal cruelty.

== Background ==
Anthony "Tony" John Todt was born on September 29, 1975, to Robert Todt and Loretta Young Todt, in Pennsylvania. His sister, Christine, was born in 1979. Robert, a special education teacher at Bensalem High School, was arrested in July 1980 and charged with hiring the brother of one of his former students to shoot and kill his wife, Loretta, in order to marry his mistress. Robert Todt strictly ordered the assassin to harm no one else but Loretta; Anthony Todt was just four years old at the time when he witnessed the attack on his mother. Robert was sentenced to 5-10 years in prison. Loretta survived the attack from a bullet to her head and went on to remarry.

Megan Denise Gula was born on January 28, 1977, to Albert Joseph Gula (1952-2002) and Gail Kopko Gula in New London, Connecticut. Anthony Todt began dating Megan at Montville High School, and the couple would marry in 2000. Megan was estranged from her mother at the time of her death. Both received master's degrees in physical therapy from Sacred Heart University. The couple worked together at a shared physical therapy clinic they owned. Following the birth of their children, Megan assumed the role of a stay-at-home mother, while Anthony took on the management of their clinic. Neighbors knew the family well, and they encouraged the Todt children to participate in the arts and music. Anthony often volunteered as a youth soccer coach, and he also worked with disabled children. In 2017, according to Anthony, Megan contracted Lyme disease after a tick bite during a trip to Walt Disney World. She then suffered from bouts of depression and became more reserved and isolated.

The Todt family moved to Celebration, Florida, after living in Connecticut for several years. Anthony Todt continued working in Connecticut at the clinic and visited the family weekly.

In April 2019, investigators discovered that Anthony was charging patients for care they had never received. An investigation ensued, which revealed Anthony was using the excess money to pay for the family home in Celebration, as well as trips to Disney World. Anthony had taken additional loans from firms in New York City who sued him for failure to pay; Todt was over $100,000 in debt. Todt initially maintained his innocence with investigators but eventually relented and admitted to the fraud. Investigators believe Megan Todt and the children were unaware of the fraud due to their lack of involvement with the business.

== Murders ==
Anthony Todt's motive for the murders is unclear, as his testimony about them changed multiple times. At one point, he had claimed Megan attempted suicide by stabbing herself in her liver after killing the children; in other testimony, he said he was trying to save the family from "the Apocalypse" and join them in the afterlife.

While the Todts usually returned to Connecticut from Florida during the winter to enjoy the snowy weather, in 2019, they remained in Celebration. The police performed an initial welfare check on December 29 but left when they received no response from anyone inside the house. Investigators from the U.S. Department of Health and Human Services Office of Inspector General and Osceola County deputies returned on January 13, 2020, after disturbing cell phone texts began appearing on family members' phones from Anthony Todt.

Despite the Todts' presence in Florida, mail piled up on the porch of the home, and an eviction notice was placed on the door. A warrant was issued for Anthony's arrest, and authorities arrived at the home. Anthony wandered out of his house shaking strangely. Obtaining a key from the property's landlord, authorities entered the home and discovered a pungent odor. In beds throughout the house, bodies of family members were discovered stabbed in their stomachs and smothered to death with crucifixes gripped in their hands. The body of Zoe Todt, the couple's 4-year-old daughter, had decomposed so severely that authorities initially couldn't find her until they examined Megan's corpse and saw the girl's body beneath her mother's feet. The family dog, Breezy, was lying dead on the floor in her dog bed in the master bedroom.

Anthony himself had consumed a large amount of Benadryl in what he claimed was a suicide attempt. The children had also been drugged with Benadryl.

=== Perpetrator ===
- Anthony John Todt (born September 29, 1975)

=== Victims ===
- Megan Todt (aged 42), wife of Anthony Todt
- Aleksander "Alek" Todt (aged 13), the couple's oldest child and first son
- Tyler Todt (aged 11), the couple's middle child and second son
- Zoe Todt (age 4), the couple's youngest child and only daughter
- Breezy, the family's dog

== Trial ==
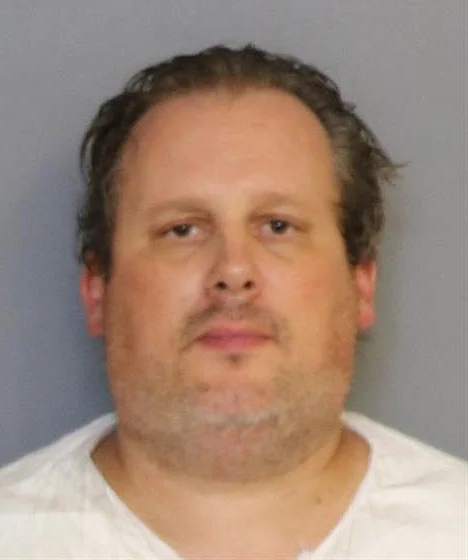
Anthony Todt booking photo, c. 2020

In January 2020, Todt was charged with four counts of first-degree murder and one count of animal cruelty in Osceola County, initially facing the death penalty. The trial began early April 2022; prosecutors showed evidence of Todt's money issues, the victims' Benadryl use, and differences between his testimonies and what the physical evidence showed. Todt testified in his own defense, saying that his confession was taken under duress and that his wife may have killed the children because they both believed the world was going to end. Anthony claimed that he was unable to recall the murders and also testified that his initial confession had been made under duress. He eventually confessed to the murders after recounting a story about returning to his family home to search for a missing silver Mickey Mouse necklace that belonged to his daughter, and youngest child, Zoe. On April 14, 2022, the jury found Anthony guilty on all counts and was given four consecutive life sentences, with no chance of parole, and an extra year for killing the family dog.

== Sentence ==
Todt is serving his life sentence at the Santa Rosa Correctional Institution in Milton, Florida. In 2024, Todt filed suit against the Osceola County Sheriff's Office, the Osceola County Jail, then-Sheriff Russell Gibson, and other officials, alleging the unauthorized release of a personal letter to his father.

== See also ==
- Crime in Florida
- Familicide
- List of murdered American children
