= John Callan (New Zealand politician) =

Irish-born New Zealand politician

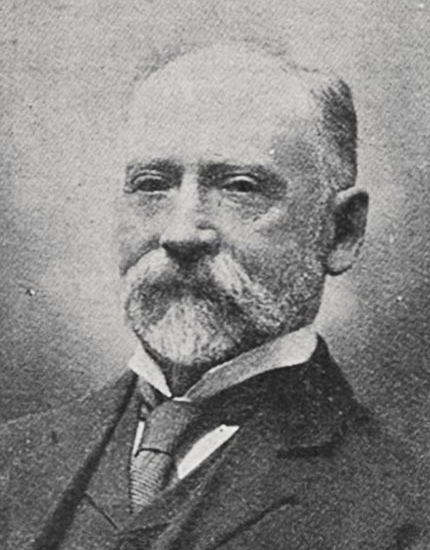
- Born: John Bartholomew Callan; 1844; Dublin, Ireland
- Died: 20 April 1928 (aged 83–84); Dunedin, New Zealand
- Occupation: Lawyer
- Known for: Member of the New Zealand Legislative Council
- Children: John Bartholomew Callan (1882–1951)

John Bartholomew Callan (1844 – 20 April 1928) was a Dunedin lawyer and member of the New Zealand Legislative Council for one seven-year term (22 January 1907 – 21 January 1914).

== Biography ==
Callan was born in Dublin, Ireland, in 1844. He emigrated to Victoria, Australia when he was 15. His son, also named John Bartholomew Callan (1882–1951) was a prominent judge. Callan senior established a practice with John McRae Gallaway in 1882 and traded as 'Callan And Gallaway'. Callan died in Dunedin on 20 April 1928.
