= Todd Krasnow =

American entrepreneur

- Born: Boston, Massachusetts
- Occupation: Businessman
- Years active: 1992–present
- Known for: Founding management team Staples Inc. and Zoots

Todd Krasnow is an American entrepreneur and businessman. He was an early-stage venture investor and part of the founding management team at Staples. In 1998 Krasnow co-founded Zoots, serving as chairman from 2003 until the company's sale in 2008.

== Early life ==
Krasnow holds an AB from Cornell University and an MBA from Harvard Business School. He was a member of the Cornell University Alumni Council and the Harvard Business School Rock Entrepreneurship Center Advisory Board. For the academic year 2006-2007, he was on the faculty as entrepreneur-in-residence at Harvard Business School.

== Career ==
In 1986, Krasnow joined Thomas G. Stemberg and Leo Kahn, co-founders of Staples, as part of the founding team as vice president of marketing. In 1992 Krasnow was appointed senior vice president of international joint ventures at Staples. He next served as executive vice president of sales and marketing beginning in 1994.

In his business capacity at Staples, Krasnow procured the naming rights to the Staples Center in LA and won a gold "Clio" award for the best retail advertising in the United States.

Krasnow co-founded Zoots with Thomas G. Stemberg in 1998, and served as CEO until 2003. He was Chairman of Zoots from 2003 until its sale in 2008. The company had $30 million in sales in 2000 and had 41 retail locations and 124 home-delivery routes with nearly 1,000 employees. In 2008 the company sold off its operating assets.

Krasnow also served as a founding director and investor in Carbonite, established in 2005. Carbonite went public in 2011 and was ultimately sold for $1.4 billion to Open Text in 2019. From 2005 to 2020 Krasnow was an operating partner at Highland Consumer Fund, which later became Porchlight Equity.

In addition, Krasnow served on the board of Tile Shop from 2012 to 2020 and helped take the company public via a merger with a special purpose acquisition company in 2012. From 2014 to 2018 he served as chair of the Harvard-Smithsonian Astrophysical Observatory Advisory Board. Krasnow currently serves on the board of Ecentria and Kids II as well as Symbotic and C&S Wholesale Grocers, run by Richard B. Cohen. He is vice chair of the Smithsonian National Board.

== Personal life ==
Krasnow and his wife live in North Palm Beach, Florida.
