= Todd Sanders =

American neon sign artist (b. 1967)

Todd Sanders (born August 10, 1967) is an American neon sign artist based in Austin, Texas.

== Early life ==
Todd Sanders was born in Houston, TX on August 10, 1967. He started sign painting while studying advertising and graphic design at Sam Houston State University. His mother influenced him to become an artist, and his father encouraged a work ethic. During a spring break trip in 1990, Sanders decided he would live in Austin, Texas.

== Career ==
After moving to Austin in 1992, Sanders started on a 2-week contract at a small neon sign art gallery called Ion Art. While working at Ion Art, he made his first vintage style neon piece as décor for a local restaurant. In 1995 he opened the first neon studio dedicated to creating weathered, vintage-appearance neon signs. He opened Roadhouse Relics in 1997, which the New York Times has since listed in their to-do list for "36 Hours in Austin, TX". The well-known “Greetings from Austin” mural on the south side of the Roadhouse Relics building was painted the same year with two other artists, Rory Skagen and Bill Brakkage.

His work is influenced by Robert Rauschenberg, Andy Warhol and Dan Flavin. Known for weathering and hand painted graphics, his work is sought by collectors worldwide. He has done work for celebrities including Willie Nelson, Shepard Fairey, Norah Jones, Johnny Depp and ZZ Top. His artwork is on the cover of Kings of Leon’s 2013 album, Mechanical Bull. Filmmakers Robert Rodriguez and Terrence Malick have put his work onscreen; it has also appeared in Esquire, Fortune, Texas Monthly, Southern Living, Southwest Airlines’ Spirit and the cover of Signs of the Times magazine. Sanders’ most popular design, his animated, 5-foot by 30-inch “Fireflies in a Mason Jar” was created for the wedding of Miranda Lambert and Blake Shelton, a collaboration with his friends the Junk Gypsies. Sanders’ pieces also hang in iconic Austin venues, including the Continental Club and Threadgill's. Sanders was invited to exhibit as a special featured artist in the 2014 Architectural Digest Home Design Show. The largest collection of Todd's neon on public display is in Bentonville, Arkansas.

== Personal life ==
In 2007, Sanders married Sarah Thompson, who opened a gift shop at the gallery. In 2010, their son John Memphis Sanders was born in Austin.
