= John Todd (rugby league) =

English rugby league footballer

Personal information
- Full name: John Todd

Playing information
- Position: Wing
Club
Years	Team	Pld	T	G	FG	P
1914–21	Wakefield Trinity	43	14	29	0	100
Representative
Years	Team	Pld	T	G	FG	P
1919	Yorkshire	1	1	0	0	3

John Todd was a professional rugby league footballer who played in the 1910s and 1920s. He played at representative level for Yorkshire, and at club level for Wakefield Trinity, as a wing.

== Playing career ==
John Todd made his début for Wakefield Trinity during October 1914, and he played his last match for Wakefield Trinity during February 1921.

=== County honours ===
John Todd won cap(s) for Yorkshire while at Wakefield Trinity.
