= Robert C. Todd =

Canadian artist (c.1809–1866)

- Born: Robert Clow Todd c.1809 Berwick-upon-Tweed, England
- Died: 7 May 1866 (aged 56–57); Toronto, Canada West
- Known for: artist
- Spouse: Mary Anne Boyle

Robert Clow Todd (c.1809 – 7 May 1866) was an early Canadian painter, known for his genre paintings and as a teacher.

== Career ==
Todd was born in Berwick-upon-Tweed, England and as a young man lived in Edinburgh and London, where he painted insignia on carriages such as escutcheons of arms. In 1833, he emigrated to Lower Canada and lived in Quebec City and in suburban Montmorency, Quebec. He advertised himself in the newspapers as a painter of signs, carriage insignia, and ornamental work. In 1853, he moved to Toronto where he advertised himself as a "Banner, Herald, Sign, and Ornamental Painter", adding "having been for several years employed by many of the first nobility and gentry in London and Edinburgh, trusts that he shall give satisfaction to those who may favor him with their patronage" ("The Quebec Gazette", January 27, 1834). He also may have carved and gilded figures in wood.

Todd is known for the spirited genre paintings he created in Quebec, horses and sleighs with their owners and tobogganers sliding down the ice cone at Montmorency Falls in winter such as The Ice Cone, Montmorency Falls, Quebec (c.1845–1850). Today, one version is in the collection of the National Gallery of Canada, Ottawa, another in the Art Gallery of Ontario, Toronto, and one in the Musée national des beaux-arts du Québec.

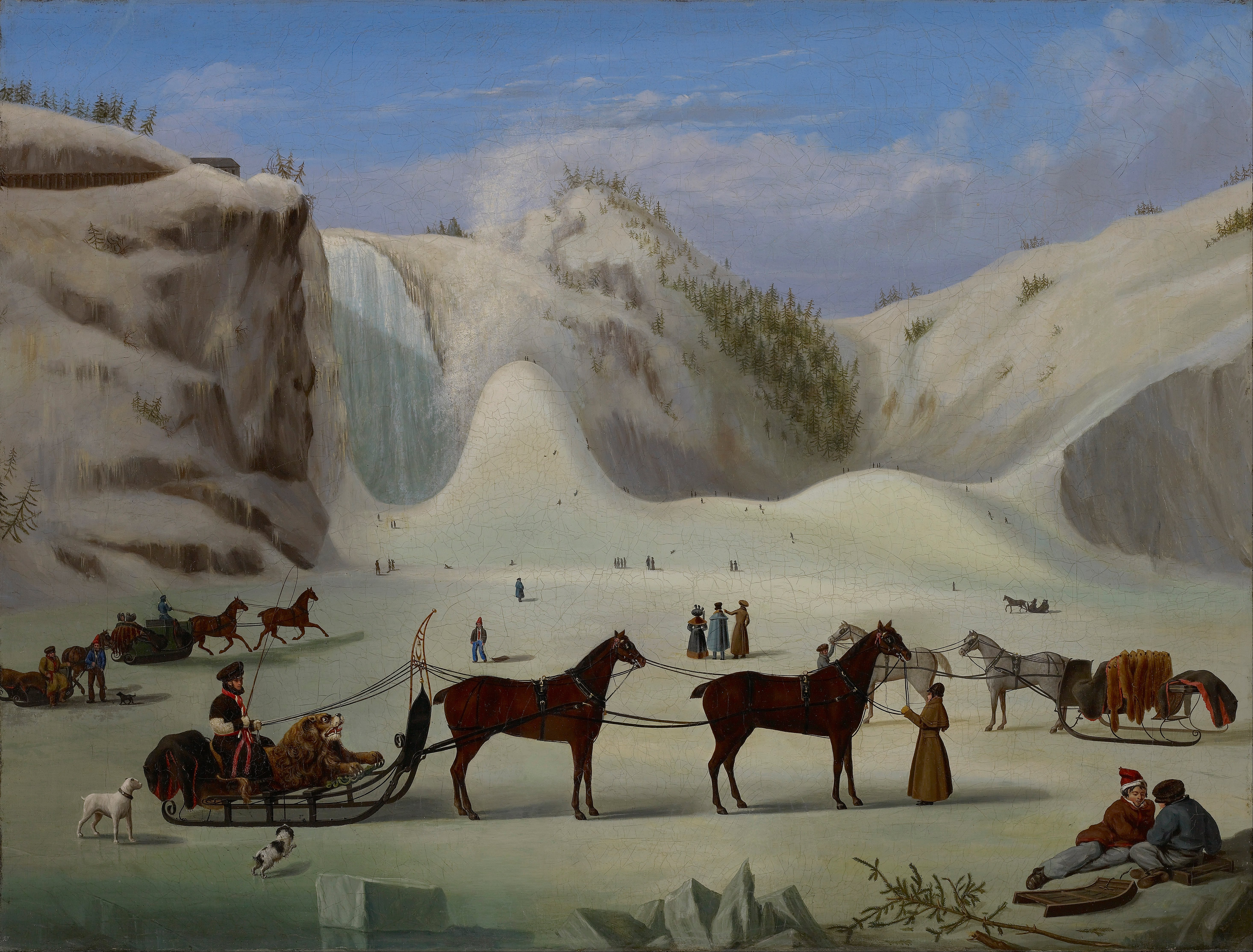
Robert Clow Todd - The Ice Cone, Montmorency Falls, Québec - Google Art Project

He also painted Montmorency Falls in the summer.

Besides these paintings, he painted portraits of horses commissioned by their owners such as the trotter Corbeau (which translates to Raven and was named for its shiny black coat) (1845, National Gallery of Canada) - the first horse picture painted in Canada - as well as the Quebec lumber docks and other works. In 1855, in Toronto, he painted a Marine subject (National Gallery of Canada). It is the only work which seems to survive from his later Toronto period.

He taught at both Séminaire de Québec and at Loretto Convent (later Loretto Abbey) in Toronto.

== Recognition ==
On 1 November 1974, Canada Post issued a 10¢ Christmas stamp of The Ice Cone at Montmorency Falls, Quebec designed by Ashton-Potter Limited.

== Record sale prices ==
At the Cowley Abbott Auction of An Important Private Collection of Canadian Art – Part III, December 6, 2023, Lot #154, Todd's Corbeau at Montmorency Falls (1845), oil on canvas, 21 x 26.5 ins ( 53.3 x 67.3 cms ), Auction Estimate: $150,000.00 - $250,000.00, realized a price of $744,000.00.
