= Margaret Todd =

Margaret Todd may refer to:

- Margaret Todd (golfer) (1918–2019), Canadian golfer
- Margaret Todd (doctor) (1859–1918), Scottish writer and doctor, coined the term isotope
- Margaret Joslin Todd (1883–1956), American film actress
- Margaret Todd (schooner), a four-masted schooner
