= Todd Township, Hubbard County, Minnesota =

Todd Township, Minnesota
- Township
- Location of Todd Township, within Hubbard County, Minnesota
- Coordinates: 46°56′38″N 95°5′16″W
- Country: United States
- State: Minnesota
- County: Hubbard

Area
  - Total: 29.7 sq mi (76.9 km^{2})
  - Land: 26.2 sq mi (67.8 km^{2})
  - Water: 3.5 sq mi (9.1 km^{2})
- Elevation: 1,467 ft (447 m)

Population (2020)
  - Total: 1,464
  - Density: 55.9/sq mi (21.6/km^{2})
- Time zone: UTC-6 (Central (CST))
  - Summer (DST): UTC-5 (CDT)
- ZIP code: 56470
- Area code: 218
- FIPS code: 27-65038
- GNIS feature ID: 0665793
- Website: https://toddtownshipmn.com/

Todd Township is a township in Hubbard County, Minnesota, United States. The population was 1,464 at the 2020 census.

Todd Township was named for Smith Todd, an early settler.

== Geography ==
According to the United States Census Bureau, the township has a total area of 29.7 square miles (76.9 km^{2}), of which 26.2 square miles (67.8 km^{2}) is land and 3.5 square miles (9.1 km^{2}) (11.82%) is water.

== Demographics ==
As of the census of 2000, there were 1,422 people, 575 households, and 435 families residing in the township. The population density was 54.3 inhabitants per square mile (21.0/km^{2}). There were 777 housing units at an average density of 29.7 per square mile (11.5/km^{2}). The racial makeup of the township was 97.89% White, 0.07% African American, 0.56% Native American, 0.14% Asian, 0.28% from other races, and 1.05% from two or more races. Hispanic or Latino of any race were 0.70% of the population.

There were 575 households, out of which 29.7% had children under the age of 18 living with them, 66.4% were married couples living together, 4.5% had a female householder with no husband present, and 24.2% were non-families. 20.3% of all households were made up of individuals, and 7.0% had someone living alone who was 65 years of age or older. The average household size was 2.47 and the average family size was 2.83.

In the township the population was spread out, with 24.1% under the age of 18, 6.4% from 18 to 24, 23.1% from 25 to 44, 29.8% from 45 to 64, and 16.5% who were 65 years of age or older. The median age was 42 years. For every 100 females, there were 106.4 males. For every 100 females age 18 and over, there were 105.9 males.

The median income for a household in the township was $38,458, and the median income for a family was $44,559. Males had a median income of $31,354 versus $21,902 for females. The per capita income for the township was $20,754. About 3.7% of families and 7.1% of the population were below the poverty line, including 8.9% of those under age 18 and 2.4% of those age 65 or over.
