= Toddy =

Toddy may refer to:

== Places ==
- Toddy Bridge, a pedestrian bridge in Singapore
- Toddy Pond, a pond in Antarctica
- Todmorden, a town in Yorkshire, England, informally called Toddy

== People ==
=== Nickname ===
- Ralph Giannini (1917–1996), American basketball player
- Toddy Kehoe (1918–2024), Canadian politician, philanthropist and disabilities activist
- Þorvaldur Örlygsson (born 1966), Icelandic football player and manager
- Toddy Puller (born 1945), American politician
- Svetoslav Todorov (born 1978), Bulgarian footballer
- Thohsaphol Sitiwatjana (born 1953), Thai-American martial artist and trainer known as Master Toddy

=== Given name ===
- Toddy O'Sullivan (1934–2021), Irish politician
- Toddy Walters (born 1969), actress and singer/songwriter

== Drinks ==
- Toddy (PepsiCo), a powdered milk drink now marketed mainly in South America
- Egg toddy, another name for eggnog
- Hot toddy, a mixed drink served hot
- Palm toddy or palm wine, an alcoholic beverage
  - Toddy palm, several species of palms used to produce palm toddy
  - Toddy shop, a drinking establishment where palm toddy is served
- Toddy coffee, a cold water coffee brewing system

== Other uses ==
- Toddy, a nickname for a toddler
- Toddy cat, an Asian palm civet

== See also ==
- Toady
- Todd (disambiguation)
- Tody
- Totty (disambiguation)
