= Jack Todd (mathematician) =

American computer scientist (1911–2007)

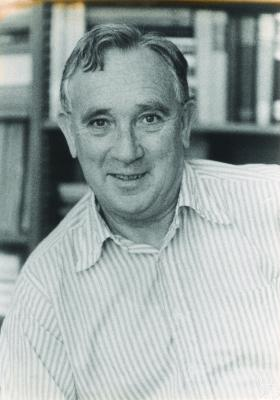
Jack Todd

John "Jack" Todd (May 16, 1911 – June 21, 2007) was a Northern Irish mathematician most of whose career was spent in England and the USA; he was a pioneer in the field of numerical analysis.

He was born in Carnacally, County Down, Ireland, and grew up near Belfast. He attended Methodist College Belfast after winning a scholarship. In his final year at the College he only studied maths as a result of his desire to become an engineer. He received his BSc degree from Queen's University in 1931, and went to St. John's College at Cambridge University, studying for 2 years with J. E. Littlewood, who advised him against getting a doctorate and just to do research.

He taught at Queen's University Belfast 1933-1937, and was an invited speaker at the 1936 ICM in Oslo on "Transfinite Superpositions of Absolutely Continuous Functions"

He worked at King's College in London for the years 1937–1939 (and again 1945–1947), where he met Olga Taussky, a matrix and number theorist (she had also been an invited speaker in Oslo). They were married in 1938. Todd returned to Belfast to teach at Methodist College Belfast 1940-1941. As part of the war effort, he had worked for the British Admiralty 1941-1945. One of Todd's greatest achievements was the preservation of the Mathematical Research Institute of Oberwolfach in Germany at the end of the war.

In 1945 the Todds emigrated to the United States and worked for the National Bureau of Standards. In 1957 they joined the faculty of California Institute of Technology in Pasadena, California.

Todd retired from the faculty, and in May, 2001 was honored by a symposium at Caltech in honor of his 90th birthday. He was called Jack Todd by all who knew him. He died at his home in Pasadena, California on June 21, 2007.
