= John J. Todd =

American judge (1927–2024)

John Joseph Todd (March 16, 1927 – September 18, 2024) was an American justice of the Minnesota Supreme Court from 1972 until his resignation on March 8, 1985.

Todd was born in Saint Paul, Minnesota on March 16, 1927. He died on September 18, 2024, at the age of 97.
