= Andrew Todd (businessman) =

New Zealand businessman

- Born: 1904; Heriot, New Zealand
- Died: 9 November 1976 (aged 71–72); Wellington, New Zealand
- Spouse: Monica Todd
- Children: six daughters
- Parent(s): Charles Todd; Mary Hegarty
- Relatives: Charles Todd (father); Charles P. Todd (brother); Desmond Todd (brother); Kathleen Todd (sister); Moyra Todd (sister); Bryan Todd (brother); Sheila Todd (sister); John Todd (nephew)

Andrew Todd (1904 – 9 November 1976) was one of four brothers who built one of New Zealand's biggest industrial and commercial enterprises. He was an important figure in the car assembly industry.

== Early life ==
Todd was born in Heriot, Otago in 1904. His grandfather was Charles Todd (1834–1892), a Scottish immigrant who had arrived in New Zealand with his wife, Mary O'Sullivan, in 1870. Charles worked at wool-scouring in Milton and gold-mining at Table Hill, Blue Spur and then Bendigo, all in Otago. In 1884, Charles commenced a fellmongery business at Heriot, Otago.

The Todd Group was commenced in Heriot when Andrew Todd's father, also named Charles Todd (1868–1942), from 1888 expanded the fellmongery into a successful stock and station business. He imported the district's first car in 1908 and in 1913 established a garage which later expanded into the Todd Motor Company. Andrew Todd commenced his primary education at the local Heriot School.

In February 1915 Charles Todd, his wife Mary (née Hegarty) and their seven children (Charles Patrick (CP), Desmond, Kathleen, Moyra, Bryan, Andrew and Sheila) shifted to Dunedin where Andrew Todd attended the Christian Brothers School. When he was older he was sent to Sydney to board at Saint Ignatius' College, Riverview.

== Business ==
Todd like his older brothers began work in the Todd Bros Ltd stock and station company wool store and then its motor garage in Dunedin before moving in 1924 into Todd Motor Co. He worked in the office and as a car salesman. Four years later he (with Bryan Todd) was appointed a director and he took over the management of the Auckland operations. In 1934 he transferred to Wellington where the head office of Todd Motors was located. When the Government tariff policy encouraged the assembly of cars in New Zealand, Todd was responsible for establishing the Petone motor assembly works in 1935 - the second assembly plant to open in New Zealand. Todd was effectively managing director (his father, Charles had the formal title), responsible for the entire factory and assembly operation. The new Petone plant assembling Hillman, Humber, and commercial vehicles. Later he became managing director and, in 1970, group chairman. In 1970, the company acquired the Mitsubishi franchise when planning for New Zealand's biggest assembly plant was under way and in 1975 Todd Park was opened at Porirua.

== Character ==
Todd had the special quality of engaging personally with all those he met from the Prime Minister to the newest worker on the line. He had considerable personal charm and had a gift for drawing people together. This was important in managing a factory employing a large labour force. In all his years, his factory did not have a single strike. He was a good Catholic, not just on Sundays; he tried to live up to the precepts of Pope Leo XII's encyclical Rerum novarum. He was also noted for his philanthropy. With his siblings he established the Todd Foundation in 1972 and as chairman of Todd Motors announced the company's gift of $1,000,000 to establish it. Todd was a member of the Wellington Golf Club and interested in a wide range of sporting activities. He died on 9 November 1976 and was survived by his wife and six daughters.

== Bibliography ==
- Galbreath, Ross (2010). Enterprise and Energy: The Todd Family of New Zealand. Wellington: Todd.
