= Charles Burr Todd =

American historian (1849–1928)

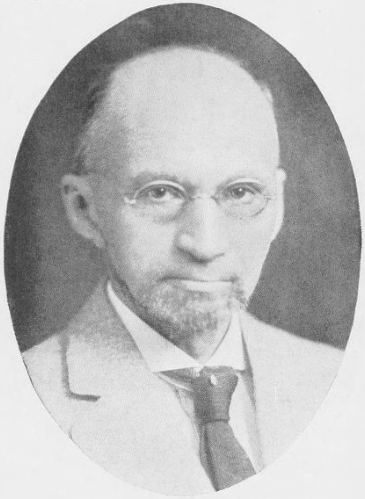
- Born: January 9, 1849; Redding, Connecticut, US
- Died: January 31, 1928 (aged 79); Washington Crossing, New Jersey, US
- Burial place: Bethel, Connecticut
- Occupation: Historian

Charles Burr Todd (January 9, 1849 – January 31, 1928) was an American historian.

== Biography ==
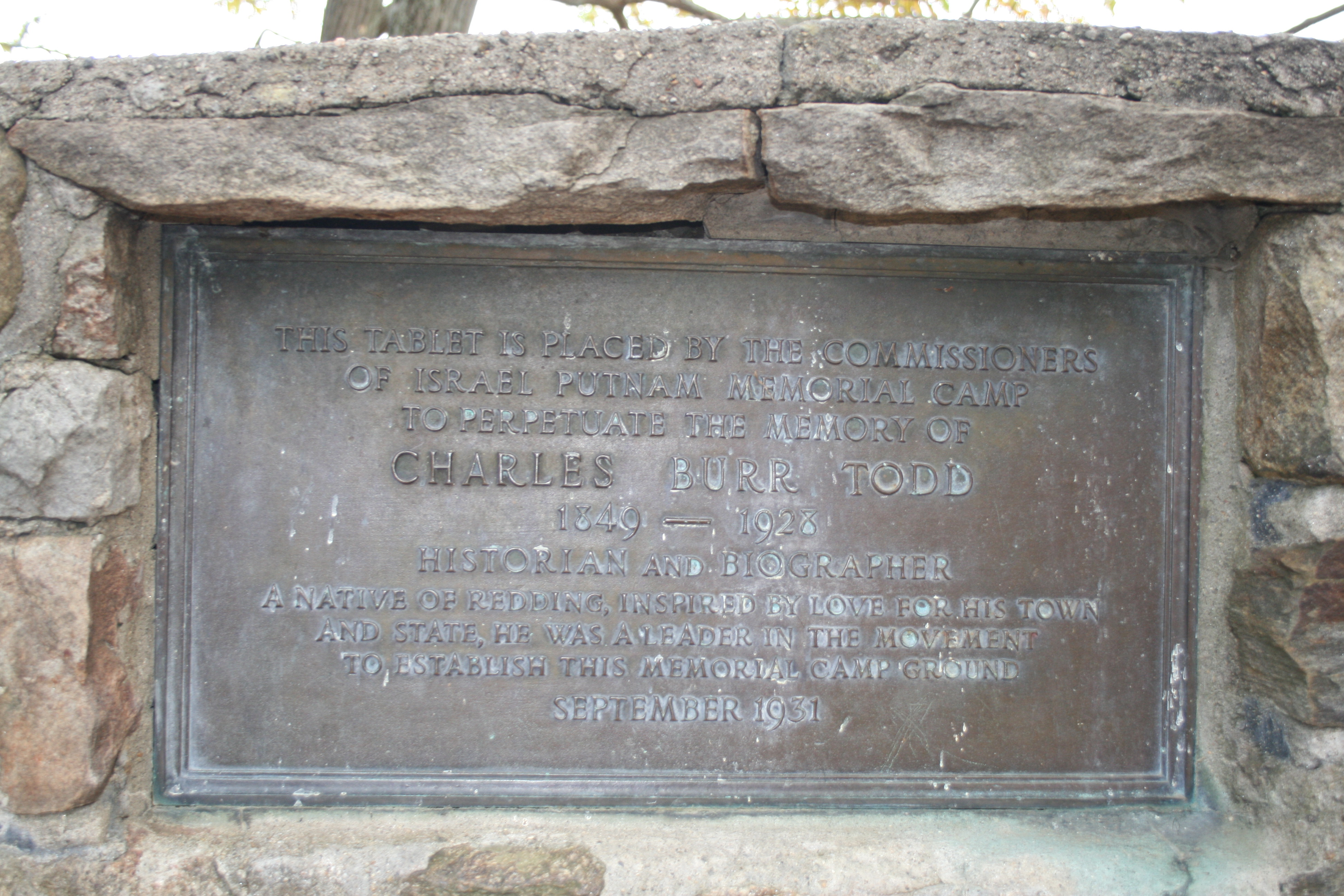
Memorial plaque to Charles Burr Todd at Putnam Memorial State Park in Redding, Connecticut

Charles Burr Todd was born at Redding, Connecticut, educated at the common schools, and fitted for college, but failure of eyesight prevented him from entering. After teaching for some time, he devoted himself to literary pursuits, and contributed to American magazines.

In May 1877, Todd was appointed commissioner for erecting a monument on the 1778-1779 winter quarters of Gen. Israel Putnam's division of Continentals in Redding, Connecticut, which was authorized by act of the Connecticut legislature. He was instrumental in the creation of Putnam Memorial State Park. As a Redding resident and historian he was interested in preserving the site, which is now a state park dedicated to Putnam's encampment.

In 1895 he was secretary of the committee appointed by Mayor Strong for the printing of early records of New York City.

In 1903 Todd entered a Washington, D.C. police station, claiming that he had been poisoned and that detectives from New York City were pursuing him with the intent of killing him for magazine articles he had written a decade earlier and that offended certain prominent New Yorkers. He appeared otherwise sane but was nonetheless confined to an insane asylum for eight days, whereupon he was released.

He died in Washington Crossing, New Jersey on January 31, 1928, and was buried in Bethel, Connecticut.

== Works ==
- A General History of the Burr Family (1878; fourth edition, 1902)
- History of Redding, Conn. (1880; second edition, 1906)
- Life and letters of Joel Barlow (1886)
- The Story of Washington, the National Capitol (1889; 1897)
- The Chautauquan (1901)
- The story of the city of New York (1902)
- The true Aaron Burr (1902)
- The real Benedict Arnold (1903)
- In Olde Connecticut (1906)
- In Olde Massachusetts (1907)
- In Olde New York (1907)
- The Washington's Crossing Sketch Book (1914)
