= Tagasauris =

- Industry: Crowdsourcing, Semantic Web, Media and Entertainment, Social Production
- Founded: December 2010
- Headquarters: New York, New York, USA
- Services: Media Annotation, Semantic Enrichment, Named Entity Recognition, Video
- Website: http://tagasauris.com/

Tagasauris is a technology startup company that was founded in New York City in December 2010. Tagasauris provides media annotation services and uses a combination of crowdsourcing, gamification, machine intelligence, and semantics to create and discover key tags for characteristics of the media object that is being annotated.

Tagasauris provided photo tagging services to Magnum Photos, allowing the digital archive of Magnum to be searchable. The project allowed volunteers to get early access to the (untagged) photo archive of Magnum Photos, and provides descriptive, semantic tags to the images.

A notable accomplishment for Tagasauris, achieved through a combination of machine and human intelligence, was the discovery of a set of "lost" photos in the Magnum archive, from the shooting of the movie American Graffiti. While the crowdsourced workers could easily identify the individuals (e.g., George Lucas, Ron Howard, Richard Dreyfuss, and Mackenzie Phillips, shown in separate photos from one shooting), the underlying machine processes connected these together to see what is common among them. The film American Graffiti was one of the suggestions. Tagasauris found nearly two dozen photos taken on the film's set with that were missing keywords.
