= Charles Todd (industrialist) =

New Zealand businessman

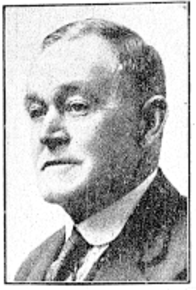

Personal details
- Born: 28 May 1868 Peebles, United Kingdom
- Died: 21 August 1942 (aged 74) Wellington, New Zealand
- Spouse: Mary Hegarty
- Children: Charles P. Todd; Desmond Todd; Kathleen Todd; Bryan Todd; Moyra Todd; Andrew Todd; Sheila Todd
- Relatives: John Todd (grandson)

Charles Todd (28 May 1868 – 21 August 1942) was a New Zealand businessman and was a principal founder of the Todd Corporation. He was a committed Catholic and prohibitionist.

Todd was mayor of St Kilda from 1923 to 1925. He twice unsuccessfully stood for election to Parliament: he contested the Dunedin South electorate for the Reform Party in 1928, and the Central Otago electorate as an independent Reform Party supporter in 1931.

== Sources ==
- Galbreath, Ross (2010). Enterprise and Energy: The Todd Family of New Zealand. Wellington: Todd.
